= Marguerite Clark =

American actress (1883–1940)

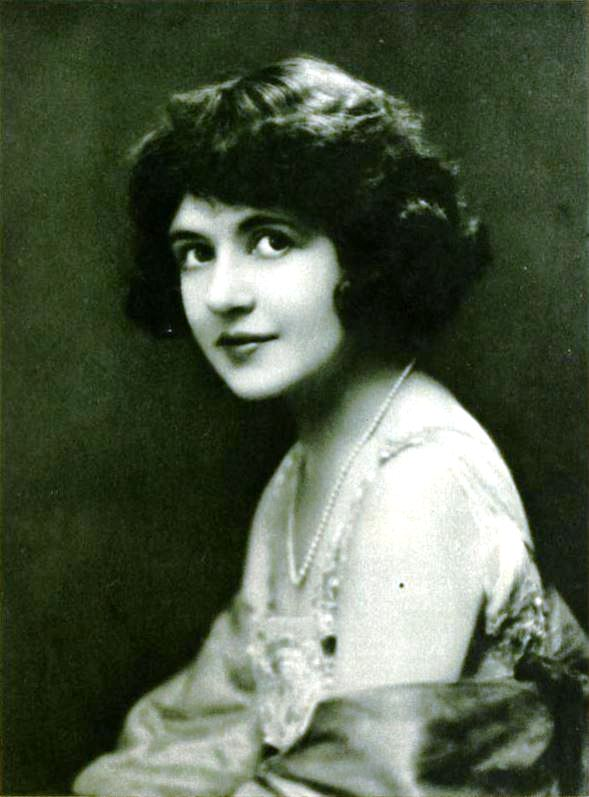
- Clark in Photoplay, 1921
- Born: Helen Marguerite Clark; February 22, 1883; Avondale, Cincinnati, Ohio, U.S.
- Died: September 25, 1940 (aged 57); New York City, New York, U.S.
- Resting place: Metairie Cemetery
- Other name: Marguerite Clarke
- Occupation: Actress
- Years active: 1900–1921
- Spouse: Harry Palmerston Williams (m. 1918; died 1936)

Helen Marguerite Clark (February 22, 1883 – September 25, 1940) was an American stage and silent film actress. As a movie actress, at one time Clark was second only to Mary Pickford in popularity. With a few exceptions and some fragments, most of Clark's films are considered lost.

== Early life ==
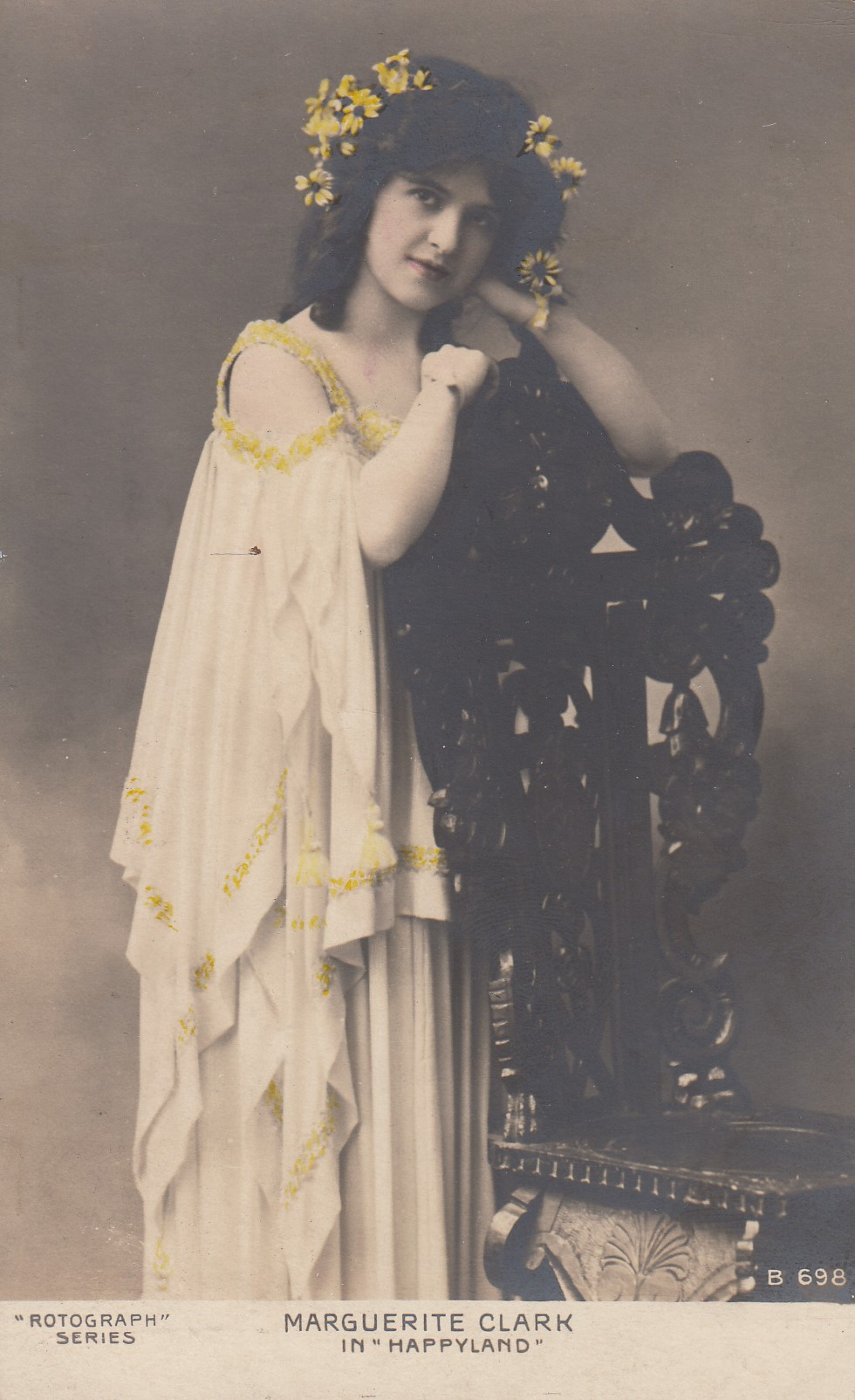
Hand-tinted postcard of Clark in the play Happyland

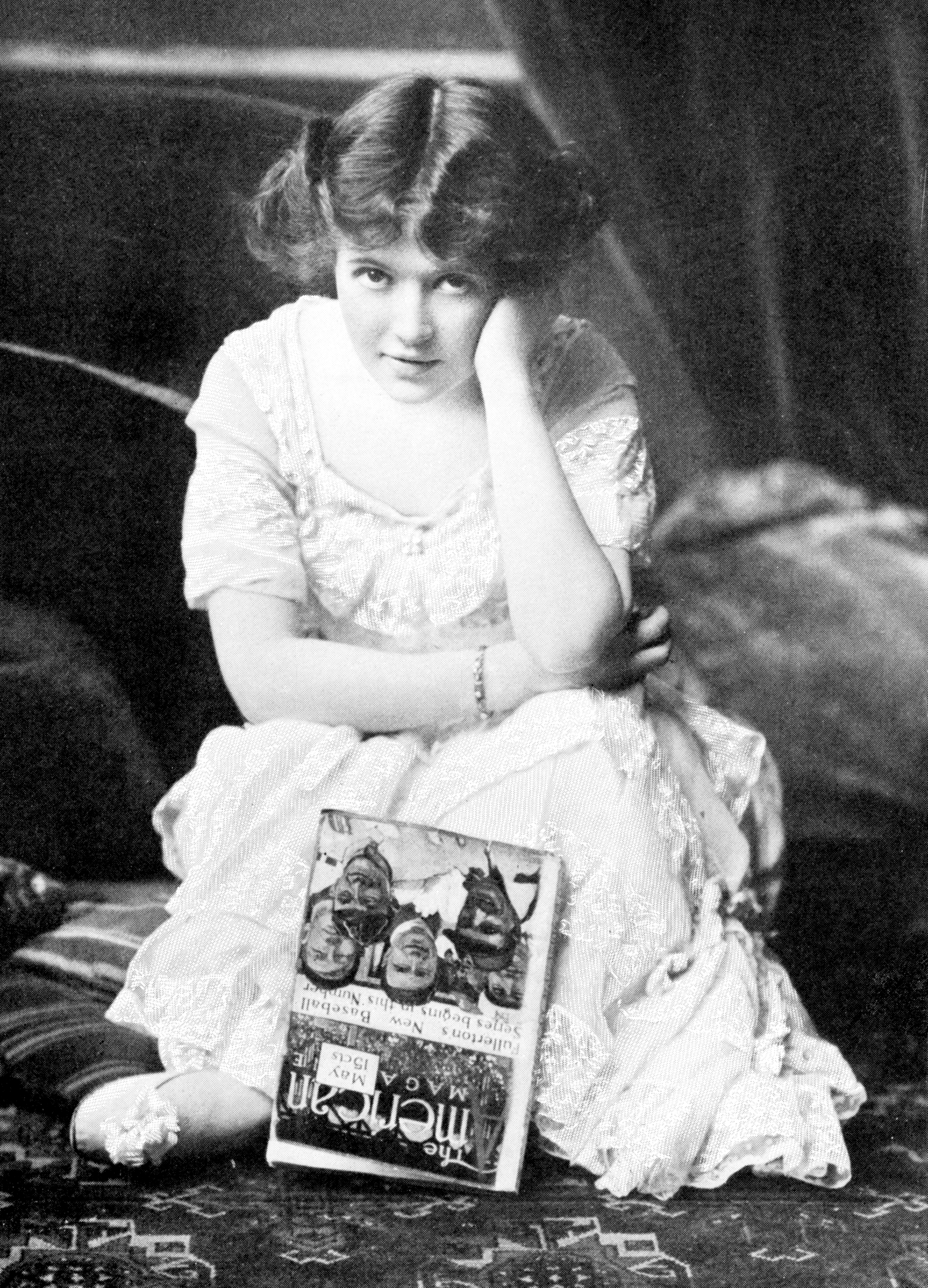
Clark in 1912, the year she starred in two Broadway plays, Snow White and the Seven Dwarfs and The Affairs of Anatol

Born in Avondale, Cincinnati, Ohio on February 22, 1883, she was the third child of Augustus "Gus" James and Helen Elizabeth Clark. She had an older sister, Cora, and an older brother named Clifton. Clark's mother Helen died on January 21, 1893. Her father worked in his self-owned successful haberdashery located in downtown Cincinnati before his death on December 29, 1896. Following his death, Clark's sister Cora was appointed her legal guardian and removed her from public school to further her education at Ursuline Academy.

== Stage career (1899–1914) ==
Marguerite Clark finished school at age 16, decided to pursue a career in the theatre, making her first stage appearance as a member of the Strakosch Opera Company in 1899.

She made her Broadway debut in 1900. The 17-year-old performed at various venues. In 1903, she was seen on Broadway opposite hulking comedian DeWolf Hopper in Mr. Pickwick. The 6-foot-6-inch (1.98 m) Hopper dwarfed the "petite and daintly" Clark who stood four-foot-ten-inches (1.5 meters). She starred opposite Hopper again in Happyland in 1905. Several adventure-fantasy roles followed. In 1909, Clark starred in the whimsical costume play The Beauty Spot, establishing the fantasy stories which would soon become her hallmark. In 1910, Clark appeared in The Wishing Ring, a play directed by Cecil B. DeMille which was later made into a motion picture by Maurice Tourneur. That same 1910 season had Clark appearing in Baby Mine, a popular play produced by William A. Brady.

In 1912, Clark performed in a lead role with John Barrymore, Doris Keane and Gail Kane in an English adaptation of Arthur Schnitzler's play Anatol, which was later made into the film The Affairs of Anatol by Clark's future movie studio Famous Players–Lasky and directed by DeMille. That same year, she starred in Snow White and the Seven Dwarfs. The classic tale was adapted for the stage by Winthrop Ames (writing under the pseudonym Jessie Braham White), who closely oversaw its production at his Little Theatre in New York and personally selected the lead actress. Clark expressed her delight in the role, and the play had a successful run into 1913.

After seeing Clark’s performance in a revival of Merely Mary Ann (1914), film producer Adolph Zukor signed her to make motion pictures with his Famous Players Film Company.

== Film career (1914–1921) ==
Snow White, full 63 minute 1916 film starring Clark

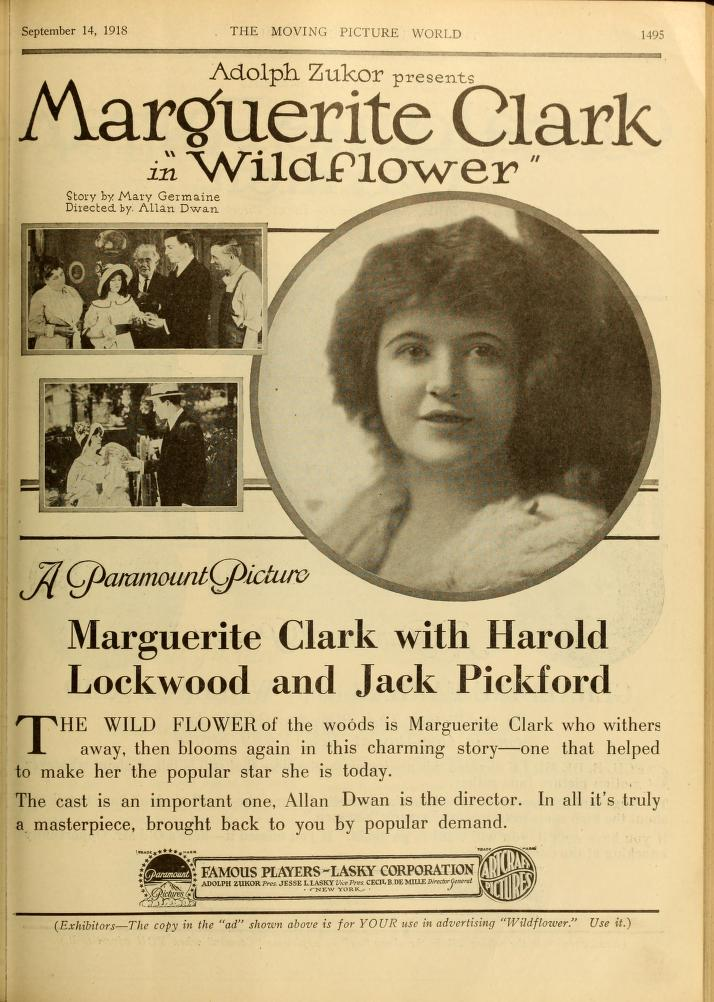
Advertisement for Wildflower in Moving Picture World (1918)

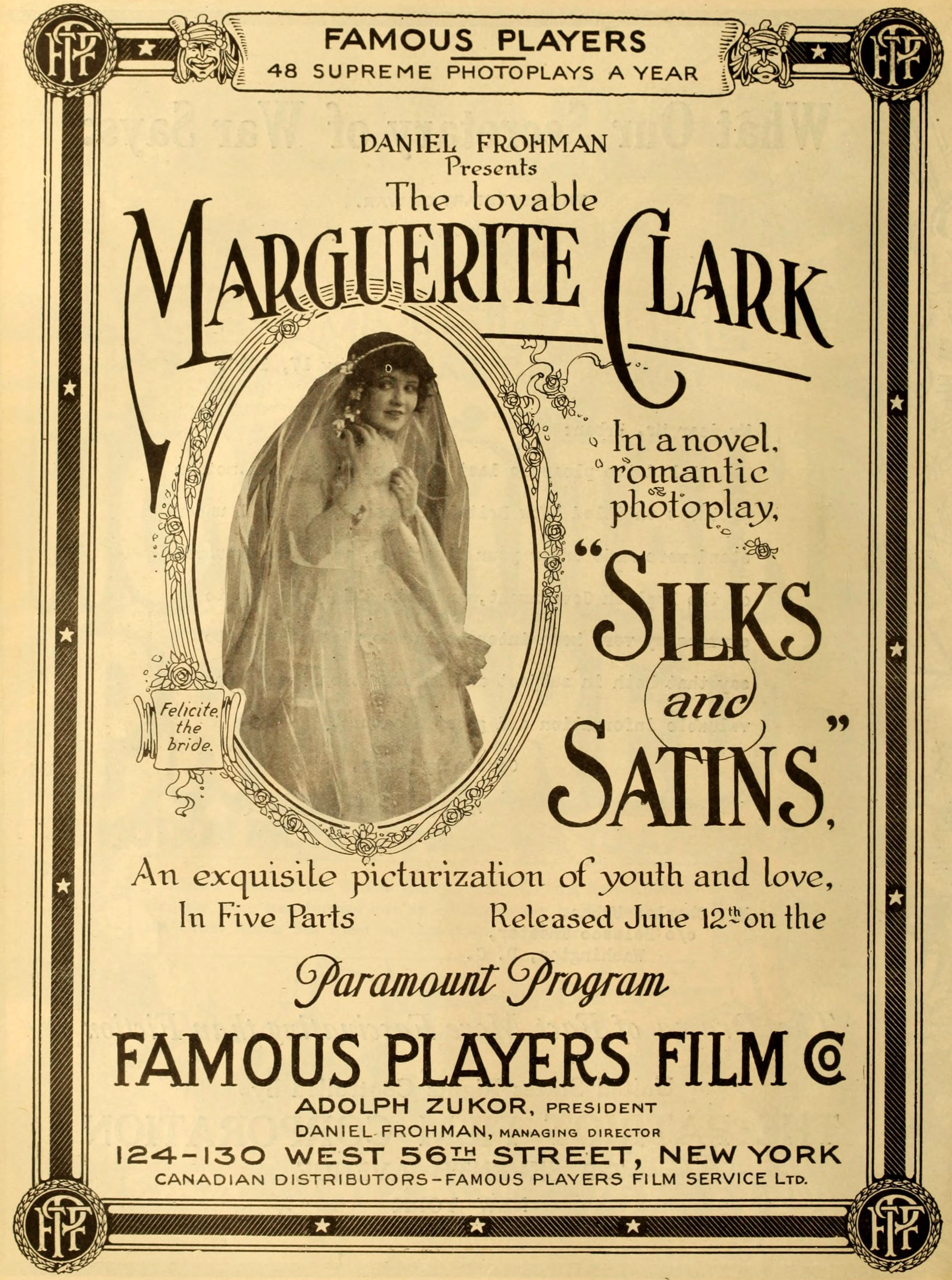
Silks and Satins (1916)

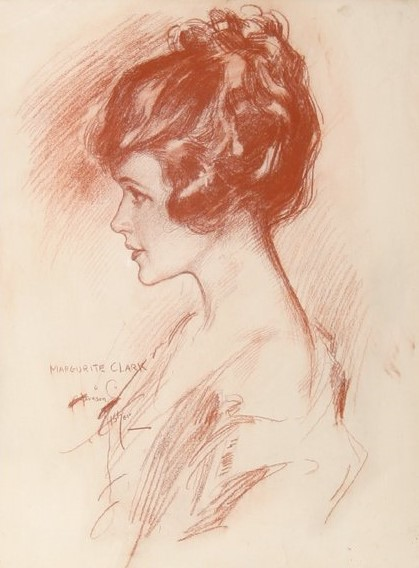
Marguerite Clark by Harrison Fisher, a red conte crayon drawing done for the March 24, 1918 edition of American Weekly

At age 31, it was relatively late in life for a film actress to begin a career with starring roles, but the diminutive Clark had a little-girl look, like Mary Pickford, that belied her years. Also, film was not developed or mature enough to showcase Clark at her youthful best at the turn of the century. These were some of the reasons established Broadway stars refused early film offers. Feature films were unheard of when Clark was in her early 20s.

Once signed with Adolph Zukor's Famous Players Film Company, she was cast in starring roles in more than a dozen features. Her first appearance on screen was in the short film Wildflower (1914), directed by Allan Dwan.

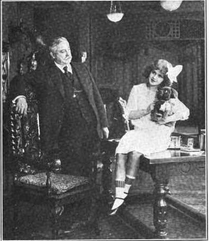
Clark in Molly Make-Believe (1916)

Marguerite Clark's emergence as an outstanding film actor was acknowledged by 1915, when Moving Picture World, in a review of The Goose Girl, based on a 1909 best-selling novel by Harold MacGrath, reported that Clark "conquers her audience in an instant." She performed in the feature-length production The Seven Sisters (1915), directed by Sidney Olcott, and then reprised her stage role in a film that would define the Clark persona—the influential 1916 screen version of Snow White.

Clark was directed in this by J. Searle Dawley, as well as in a number of films, notably when she played the characters of both "Little Eva St. Clair" and "Topsy" in the feature Uncle Tom's Cabin (1918).

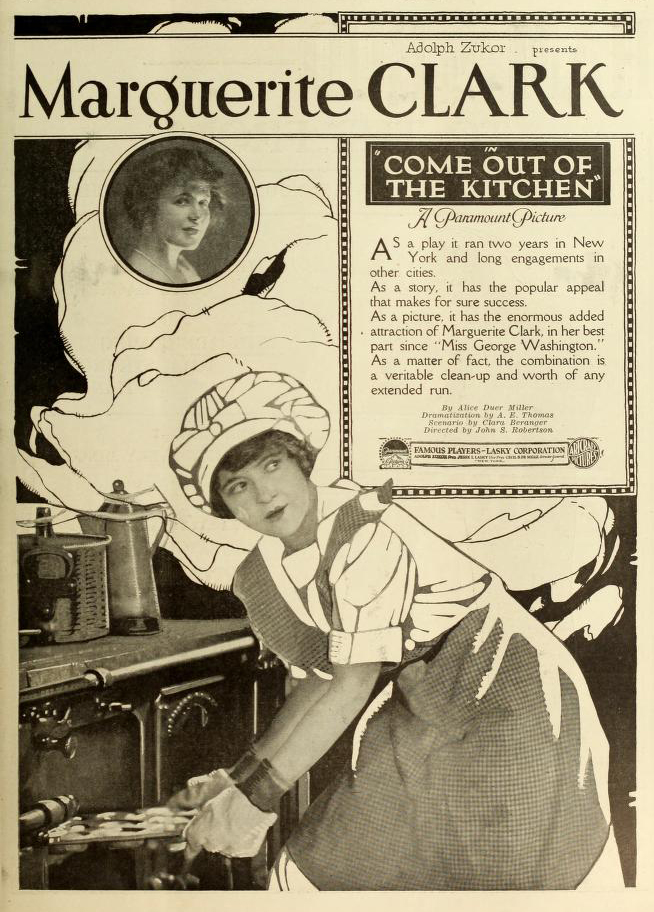
Promotion in Moving Picture World, 1919

Clark starred in Come Out of the Kitchen (1919), which was filmed in Pass Christian, Mississippi, at Ossian Hall. The same year, she enrolled as a yeowoman in the naval reserves. Clark made all but one of her 40 films with Famous Players–Lasky, her last with them in 1920 titled Easy to Get, in which she starred opposite silent film actor Harrison Ford. Her next film, in 1921, was made by her own production company for First National Pictures distribution. As one of the most popular actresses going into the 1920s, and one of the industry's best paid, her name alone was enough to ensure reasonable box office success. As such, Scrambled Wives was made under her direction, following which she retired at age 38 to be with her husband at their country estate in New Orleans.

Critic Alice Hall, writing in Picturegoer magazine (April 1921), observed that the 34-year-old Clark, near the end of her film career "seems to have discovered the secret of perpetual youth; and with it moreover, to have combined the grace and charm which the wisdom of experience alone can bring."

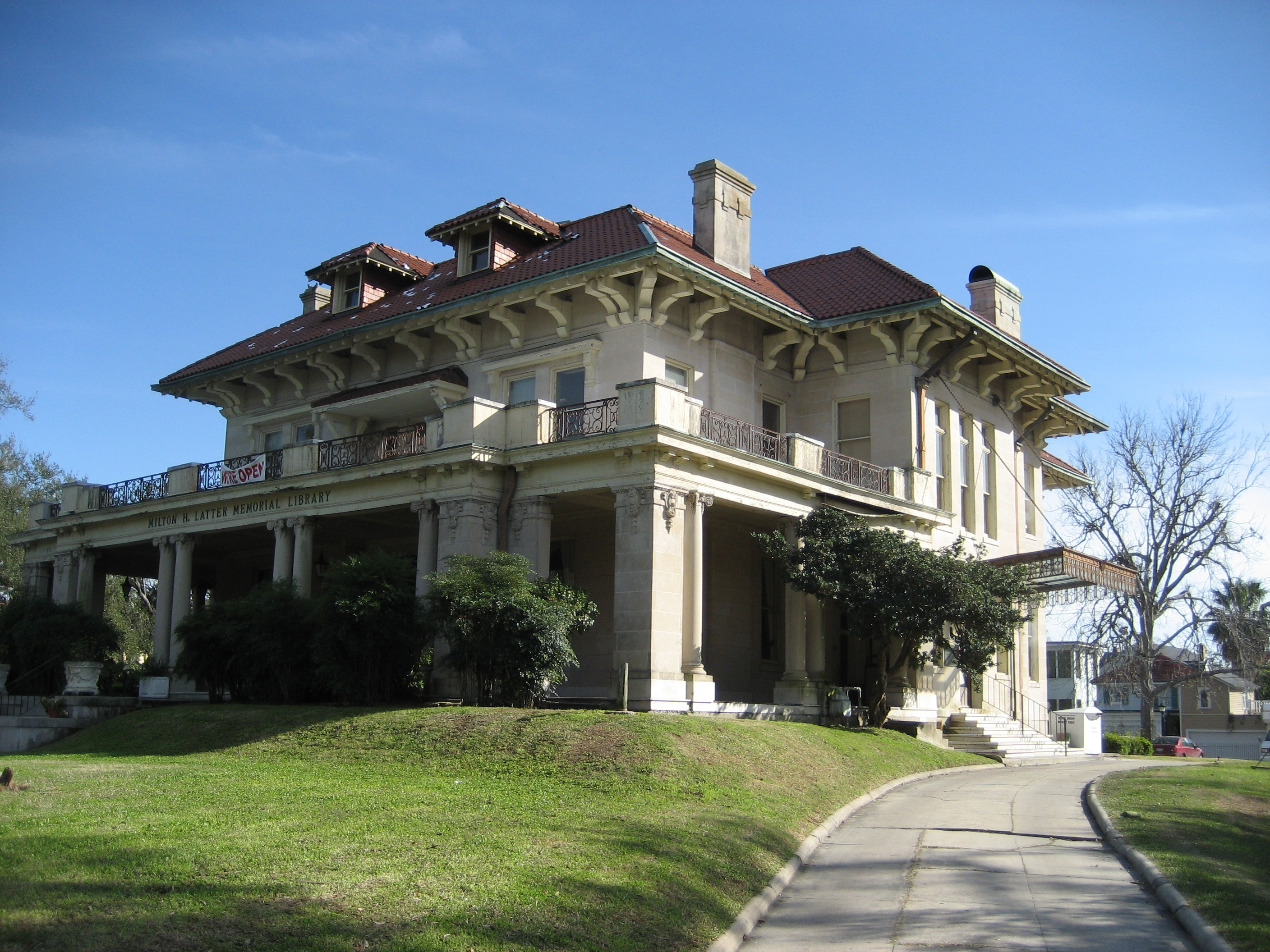
Clark and Williams' former mansion on St. Charles Avenue in Uptown New Orleans now houses the Latter branch of the New Orleans Public Library

=== Pickford and Clark "rivalry" ===
Mary Pickford and Marguerite Clark were working at the same movie studio, Famous Players–Lasky, as they emerged as major Hollywood stars of the silent film era. While the two remained personally disengaged, a "definite rivalry" developed over their respective critical and popular successes.

According to film historian Paul O'Dell, the competition was evidenced primarily by the apparent hostility between Pickford's mother Charlotte and Clark's mother Helen and older sister, Cora. The rivalry became explicit in 1918 when Motion Picture Magazine conducted a poll among movie fans that garnered Pickford 158,199 votes to Clark's 138,852 (53% to 47%).

As to Pickford's narrow margin of success over Clark in popularity, film producer Samuel Goldwyn, writing in his 1923 memoir Behind the Screen, provides this assessment:

Mary Pickford long outlasted her fair rival. Why was this? Marguerite Clark was beautiful, she was exquisitely graceful, and she brought to the screen a more finished stage technique and a more spacious background than did Miss Pickford. My answer to this question applies not only to Miss Clark, but all other actresses who have flashed, meteor-like, across the screen horizon. First of all, she did not have Mary Pickford's absorbing passion for work. Secondly, she did not possess the other artist's capacity for portraying fundamental human emotion: simple and direct and poignant. Mary goes to the heart, much as does a Stephen Foster melody. Herein is the success of a popularity so phenomenally sustained.

== Personal life ==
On August 15, 1918, Clark married New Orleans, Louisiana, plantation owner and millionaire businessman—then a US Army Lieutenant—Harry Palmerston Williams, a marriage that ended with the death of Williams on May 19, 1936 in an aircraft crash. After his death, Clark owned Wedell-Williams Air Service Corporation, which had built and flown air racers, along with other aviation enterprises, until sold in 1937.

== Death ==
After the death of her husband, Clark moved to New York City where she lived with her sister Cora. On September 20, 1940, she entered LeRoy Sanitarium where she died five days later of pneumonia. A private funeral was held at Frank E. Campbell Funeral Chapel on September 28. She was cremated and buried with her husband in Metairie Cemetery in New Orleans.

For her contribution to the motion picture industry, Marguerite Clark has a star on the Hollywood Walk of Fame at 6304 Hollywood Boulevard.

== Broadway credits ==
Date	Production	Role
September 24 – November 10, 1900	The Belle of Bohemia	Rosie Mulberry
October 7 – November 30, 1901	The New Yorkers	Mary Lamb
May 5 – August 30, 1902	The Wild Rose	Lieutenant Gaston Gardennes
January 19 – May 1903	Mr. Pickwick	Polly
June 22 – July 18, 1903	George W. Lederer's Mid-Summer Night Fancies	Dorothy
October 2, 1905 – June 2, 1906	Happyland	Sylvia
December 3, 1908 – January 16, 1909	The Pied Piper	Elviria
April 10 – August 7, 1909	The Beauty Spot	Nadine, General Samovar's daughter
January 10 – January 22, 1910	The King of Cadonia	Princess Marie
January 20, 1910 – Closing date unknown	The Wishing Ring	
May 10 – June 1910	Jim the Penman	
August 23, 1910 – Closing date unknown	Baby Mine	Zoie Hardy
October 14 – December 1912	The Affairs of Anatol	Hilda
November 7, 1912 – Closing date unknown	Snow White and the Seven Dwarfs	Snow White
May 1 – May 1913	Are You a Crook?	Amy Herrick
October 27, 1913 – Closing date unknown	Prunella	Prunella

== Filmography ==
Film
Year	Title	Role	Notes
1914	Wildflower	Letty Roberts	Lost film
1914	The Crucible	Jean	Lost film
1915	The Goose Girl	Gretchen	Lost film
1915	Gretna Green	Dolly Erskine	Lost film
1915	The Pretty Sister of Jose	Pepita	Lost film
1915	The Seven Sisters	Mici	Lost film
1915	Heléne of the North	Heléne Dearing	Lost film
1915	Still Waters	Nesta	Lost film
1915	The Prince & the Pauper	Prince Edward/Tom Canty	Lost film
1916	Mice and Men	Peggy	Lost film
1916	Out of the Drifts	Elise	Lost film
1916	Molly Make-Believe	Molly	Lost film
1916	Silks and Satins	Felicite	
1916	Little Lady Eileen	Eileen Kavanaugh	Lost film
1916	Miss George Washington	Bernice Somers	Lost film
1916	Snow White	Snow White	
1917	The Fortunes of Fifi	Fifi	Lost film
1917	The Valentine Girl	Marion Morgan	Lost film
1917	The Amazons	Lord Tommy	Lost film
1917	Bab's Diary	Bab Archibald	Lost film
1917	Bab's Burglar	Bab Archibald	Lost film
1917	Bab's Matinee Idol	Bab Archibald	Lost film
1917	The Seven Swans	Princess Tweedledee	Lost film
1918	Rich Man, Poor Man	Betty Wynne	Lost film
1918	Prunella	Prunella	Incomplete film
1918	Uncle Tom's Cabin	Little Eva St. Clair/Topsy	Lost film
1918	Out of a Clear Sky	Countess Celeste de Bersek et Krymm	Lost film
1918	The Biggest and the Littlest Lady in the World	The Little Lady	Lost film; a short about war bonds
1918	Little Miss Hoover	Ann Craddock	
1919	Mrs. Wiggs of the Cabbage Patch	Lovey Mary	
1919	Three Men and a Girl	Sylvia Weston	Lost film
1919	Let's Elope	Eloise Farrington	Lost film
1919	Come Out of the Kitchen	Claudia Daingerfield	Lost film
1919	Girls	Pamela Gordon	Lost film
1919	Widow by Proxy	Gloria Grey	Lost film
1919	Luck in Pawn	Annabel Lee	
1919	A Girl Named Mary	Mary Healey	Lost film
1920	All of a Sudden Peggy	Peggy O'Hara	Lost film
1920	Easy to Get	Molly Morehouse	Lost film
1921	Scrambled Wives	Miss Mary Lucille Smith	Lost film

== Sources ==
- Basinger, Jeanine. 1999. Silent Stars. Alfred A. Knopf, New York. ISBN 0-679-43840-8
- Blum, Daniel. Pictorial History of the American Theater. New York: Random House Value Publishing, First edition 1950. ISBN 0-517-53022-8.
- Nunn, Curtis. Marguerite Clark: America's Darling of Broadway and the Silent Screen. Fort Worth, Texas: The Texas Christian University Press, 1981. ISBN 0-912646-69-1.
- O'Dell, Paul (1970). Griffith and the Rise of Hollywood (1970 ed.). New York: A. S. Barnes & Co. p. 163. ISBN 0-498-07718-7.
