= Miss George Washington =

1916 film by J. Searle Dawley

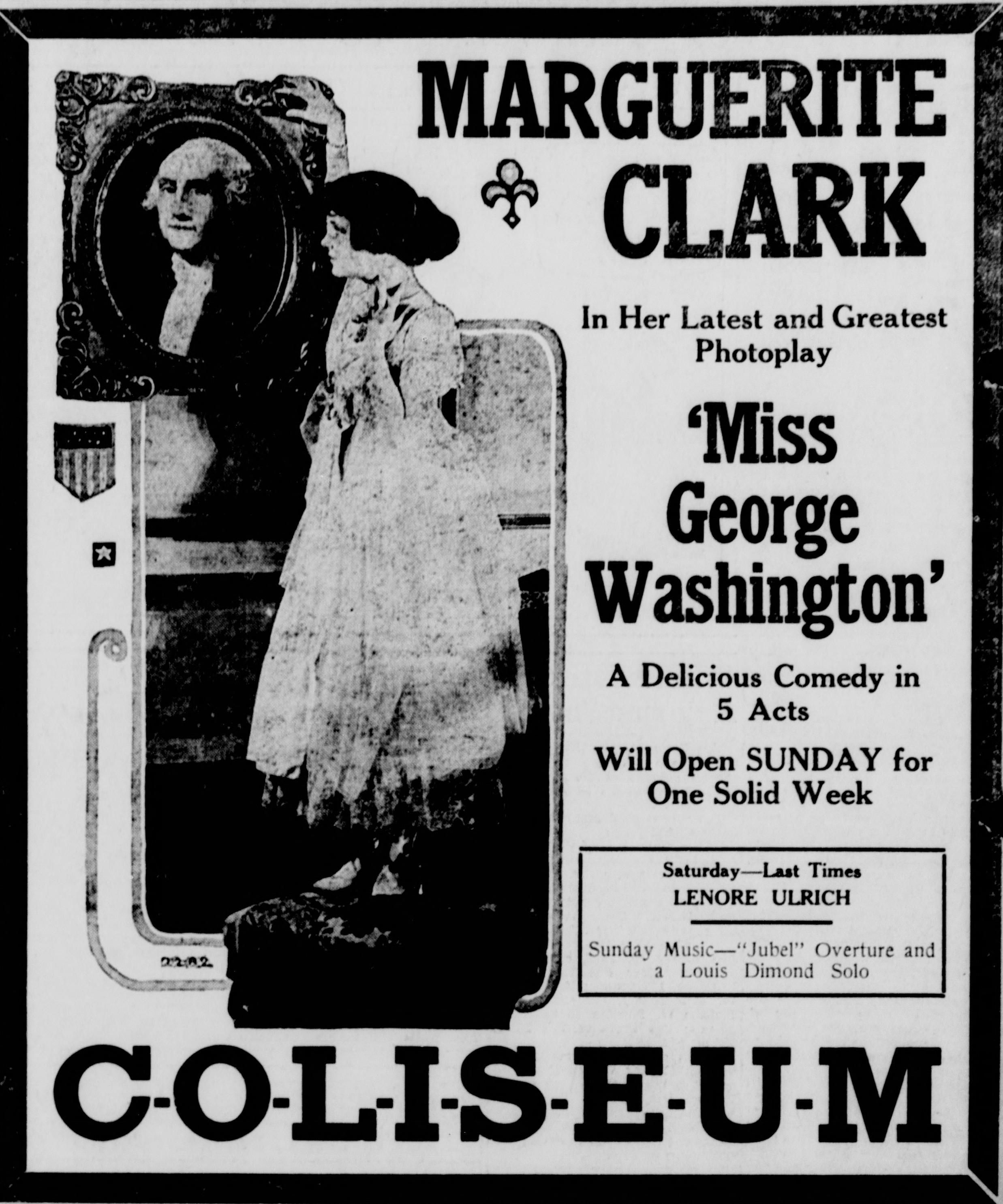
- Newspaper advertisement
- Directed by: J. Searle Dawley
- Written by: Lew Allen
- Produced by: Daniel Frohman
- Starring: Marguerite Clark; Niles Welch
- Cinematography: H. Lyman Broening
- Production company: Famous Players Film Company
- Distributed by: Paramount Pictures
- Release date: November 19, 1916
- Running time: 5 reels
- Country: United States
- Language: Silent (English intertitles)

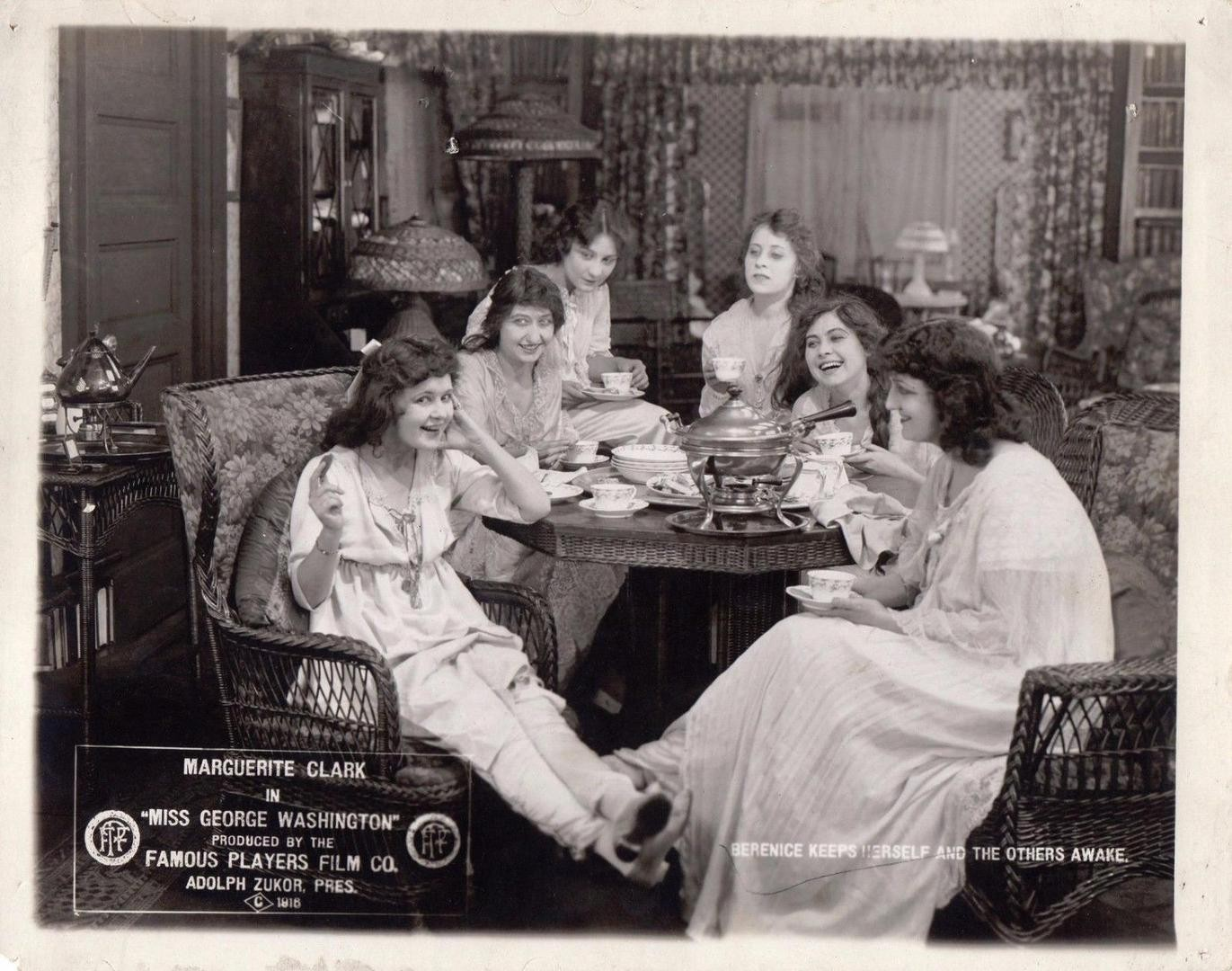
Lobby card. *note an uncredited Charlotte Greenwood 2nd from left.

Miss George Washington is a lost 1916 American silent comedy film directed by J. Searle Dawley and starring Marguerite Clark. It was produced by Adolph Zukor through his Famous Players Film Company and distributed by Paramount Pictures.

== Plot ==
A girl named Bernice Sommers gets herself and those around her into trouble by her constant fibbing. The films title makes the contrary allusion that George Washington never told a lie.

On December 1, 1917, the Belmont Courier in Belmont, Massachusetts printed a brief plot summary in an article about the movie showing at The Waverley Theatre on Trapelo Road (later renamed the Strand Theater and currently named The Studio Cinema): "Marguerite Clark, the exquisite little Famous Players star who has become one of the foremost photoplay stars on the screen is presented at the Waverley Theatre on Wednesday next week on the Paramount Program in the screamingly funny farce "Miss George Washington" directed by J. Searle Dowley, in which the little star plays the part of a girl who cannot tell the truth but who is reputed to never have told a lie in her life. It is one of the cleverest roles in which she has appeared."

== Cast ==
- Marguerite Clark - Bernice Somers
- Frank Losee - Judge Altwold
- Niles Welch - Cleverley Trafton
- Florence Martin - Alice Altwold
- Joseph Gleason - Paul Carroll
- Maude Turner Gordon - Mrs. Altwold
- Billy Watson - Miss Perkins
- Herbert Prior - Colonel J.P. Worthington

uncredited

- Charlotte Greenwood - attendee at tea social
