= Ottola Nesmith =

American actress (1889–1972)

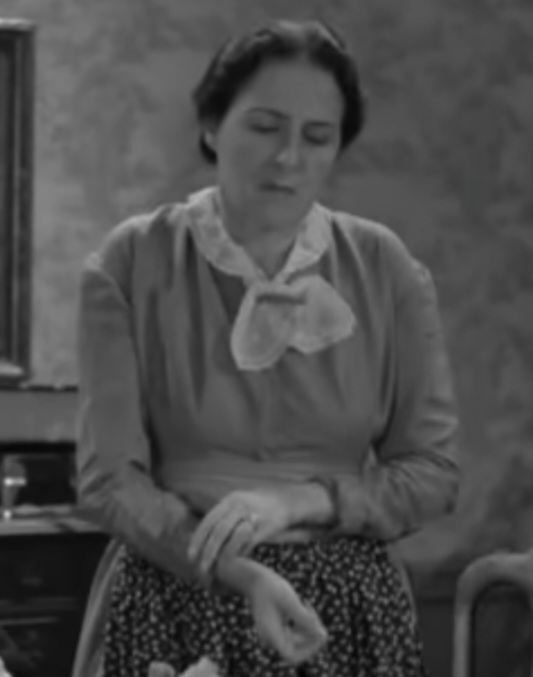
- Nesmith in Invisible Ghost (1941)
- Born: December 12, 1889
- Died: February 7, 1972 (aged 82); Hollywood, California, U.S.
- Resting place: Forest Lawn Memorial Park, Glendale, California
- Occupation: Actress
- Years active: 1913–1969
- Spouse: Leon D'Usseau
- Children: 4, including Arnaud d'Usseau

Ottola Nesmith (December 12, 1889 – February 7, 1972) was an American actress who appeared in more than 100 films and television shows, including Cheyenne (TV series) and Alfred Hitchcock Presents. She hosted a horror television program on KTLA.

== Early years ==
Nesmith's father was Otto Nesmith, an officer in the United States Army. She began acting with a stock theater company in San Diego.

== Personal life ==
Nesmith married screenwriter and director Leon D'Usseau; they had four children, including Arnaud d'Usseau. She died in 1972 at the age of 82 in Hollywood, California and was buried in Forest Lawn Memorial Park (Glendale).

== Selected filmography ==
- Still Waters (1915) - Drasa La Rue
- Rich Man, Poor Man (1918) - Mrs. Wynne
- Beyond Price (1921) - Mrs. Temple
- Wife Against Wife (1921) - Florence Bromley
- The Girl-Shy Cowboy (1928) - Girls' College Teacher
- Back Page (1934) - Gertrude Mellon
- Wings in the Dark (1935) - Housekeeper (uncredited)
- Becky Sharp (1935) - Lady Jane Crawley
- She Gets Her Man (1935) - Club Woman (uncredited)
- A Feather in Her Hat (1935) - Susan (uncredited)
- Ship Cafe (1935) - Lady Todhunter (uncredited)
- The Unguarded Hour (1936) - Mrs. Samuel Metford (uncredited)
- Anthony Adverse (1936) - Sister Ursula (uncredited)
- Three Men on a Horse (1936) - Head Nurse
- Flying Hostess (1936) - Passenger (uncredited)
- A Doctor's Diary (1937) - Maternity Ward Nurse (uncredited)
- Nobody's Baby (1937) - Head Nurse
- The Prince and the Pauper (1937) - Lady in Waiting (uncredited)
- Partners in Crime (1937) - Committee Woman (uncredited)
- The Buccaneer (1938) - Dolly Madison's Dinner Guest (uncredited)
- Fools for Scandal (1938) - Agnes
- The Beloved Brat (1938) - Mrs. Higgins (uncredited)
- Keep Smiling (1938) - Woman at Auction (uncredited)
- The Story of Alexander Graham Bell (1939) - Nora (uncredited)
- Undercover Doctor (1939) - Nurse (uncredited)
- The Star Maker (1939) - Elderly Lady
- Television Spy (1939) - Caroline Sheldon
- Miracle on Main Street (1939) - Welfare worker
- Lillian Russell (1940) - Miss Smyth
- Her First Romance (1940) - Mrs. Whiting
- Invisible Ghost (1941) - Mrs. Mason
- Shining Victory (1941) - Nurse (uncredited)
- The Hard-Boiled Canary (1941) - Mrs. Stevens (uncredited)
- Blossoms in the Dust (1941) - Nana, the Governess (uncredited)
- The Deadly Game (1941) - Nazi Wife
- International Squadron (1941) - Mrs. Harris (uncredited)
- When Ladies Meet (1941) - Third Autograph Seeker (uncredited)
- H.M. Pulham, Esq. (1941) - Mrs. Prinkle, Dance School Teacher (uncredited)
- The Wolf Man (1941) - Mrs. Bally (uncredited)
- We Were Dancing (1942) - Mrs. Gertrude Quimby (uncredited)
- Reap the Wild Wind (1942) - Dowager at Tea (uncredited)
- The Great Man's Lady (1942) - Mrs. Frisbee (uncredited)
- This Above All (1942) - Minor Role (uncredited)
- Mrs. Miniver (1942) - Saleslady (uncredited)
- Night in New Orleans (1942) - Elevator Passenger (uncredited)
- Her Cardboard Lover (1942) - Mrs. Burton, Casino Patron (uncredited)
- Journey for Margaret (1942) - Nurse (uncredited)
- The Leopard Man (1943) - Señora Contreras (uncredited)
- Two Tickets to London (1943) - Teacher (uncredited)
- Thumbs Up (1943) - English Matron (uncredited)
- The Man from Down Under (1943) - Minor Role (uncredited)
- The Seventh Victim (1943) - Mrs. Loughwood (uncredited)
- The Return of the Vampire (1943) - Elsa Walter, Governess
- The Story of Dr. Wassell (1944) - Missionary's Wife (uncredited)
- The White Cliffs of Dover (1944) - Orderly in Hospital (uncredited)
- Ministry of Fear (1944) - Woman at Admission Gate (uncredited)
- Casanova Brown (1944) - Patient's Nurse (uncredited)
- Our Hearts Were Young and Gay (1944) - Fur Shop Owner (uncredited)
- Three Sisters of the Moors (1944, Short) - Townswoman (uncredited)
- And Now Tomorrow (1944) - Mrs. Raines (uncredited)
- Practically Yours (1944) - Hysterical Woman in Senate (uncredited)
- Molly and Me (1945) - Lady Alexander (uncredited)
- Love Letters (1945) - Elderly Nurse (uncredited)
- Her Highness and the Bellboy (1945) - Diplomat's Wife (uncredited)
- My Name Is Julia Ross (1945) - Mrs. Robinson (uncredited)
- A Letter for Evie (1946) - Red Cross Nurse (uncredited)
- To Each His Own (1946) - Dora (uncredited)
- Cluny Brown (1946) - Mrs. Tupham (uncredited)
- The Late George Apley (1947) - Madame at Modiste Shop (uncredited)
- Buck Privates Come Home (1947) - French Matron (uncredited)
- Down to Earth (1947) - Dowager ('I adore musicals..') (uncredited)
- Unconquered (1947) - Woman (uncredited)
- Forever Amber (1947) - Mrs. Chiverton (uncredited)
- The Mating of Millie (1948) - Saleswoman (uncredited)
- Julia Misbehaves (1948) - Saleslady (uncredited)
- Boston Blackie's Chinese Venture (1949) - Solicitous Tourist (uncredited)
- A Connecticut Yankee in King Arthur's Court (1949) - Tourist (uncredited)
- Any Number Can Play (1949) - Minor Role (uncredited)
- The Doctor and the Girl (1949) - Martha, Receptionist (uncredited)
- Chicago Deadline (1949) - Sister John (uncredited)
- Chinatown at Midnight (1949) - Mrs. Langdon (uncredited)
- Samson and Delilah (1949) - (uncredited)
- The File on Thelma Jordon (1950) - Mrs. Asher (uncredited)
- My Friend Irma Goes West (1950) - Second Teacher (uncredited)
- Sunset Blvd. (1950) - Minor Role (uncredited)
- Let's Dance (1950) - Wife / Guest (uncredited)
- The Son of Dr. Jekyll (1951) - Nurse (uncredited)
- The Greatest Show on Earth (1952) - Spectator (uncredited)
- Invitation (1952) - Guest (uncredited)
- Scaramouche (1952) - Lady-in-Waiting (uncredited)
- I, the Jury (1953) - Cathy (uncredited)
- Man Crazy (1953) - Mrs. Becker
- The Swan (1956) - Housekeeper (uncredited)
- Something of Value (1957) - Nurse - Nairobi Hospital (uncredited)
- Witness for the Prosecution (1957) - Miss Johnson (uncredited)
- Cheyenne (1960) (Season 4 Episode 12: "Alibi for the Scalped Man") - as Liza Marley
- From the Terrace (1960) - Lady Servringham (uncredited)
- Alfred Hitchcock Presents (1961) (Season 7 Episode 10: "Services Rendered") - Woman
- Pigeons from Hell, Boris Karloff's Thriller (1961) - The Zuvembie, Eula Lee Blassenville
- The Notorious Landlady (1962) - Flower Woman (uncredited)
- The Unsinkable Molly Brown (1964) - Courtiere (uncredited)
- Inside Daisy Clover (1965) - Dolores
- Stagecoach (1966) - Landlady (uncredited)
- The Comic (1969) - Housekeeper (uncredited)
