= Molly Make-Believe =

1916 film by J. Searle Dawley

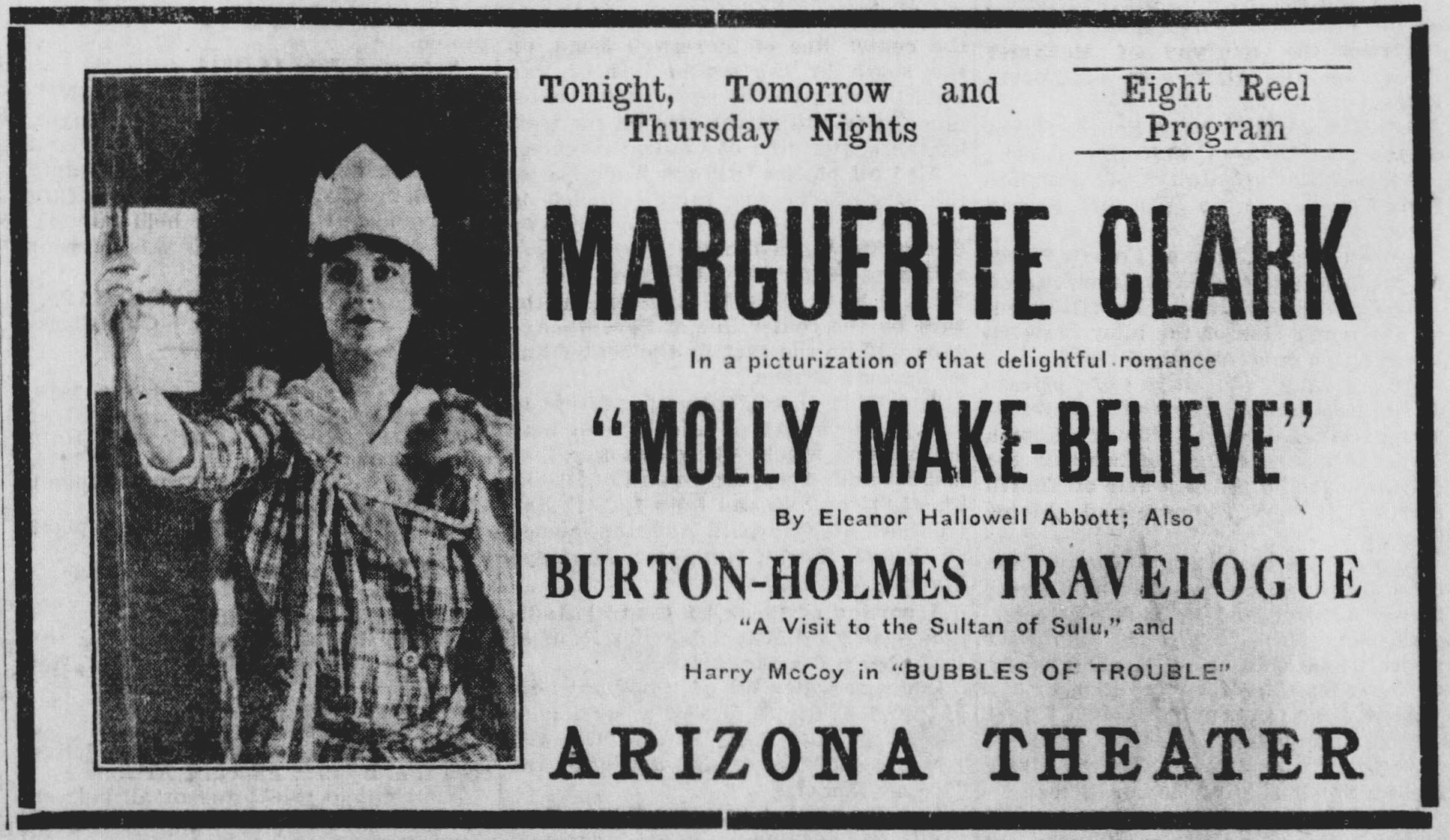
- Newspaper advertisement
- Directed by: J. Searle Dawley
- Written by: Hugh Ford; Doty Hobart
- Based on: Molly Make-Believe by Eleanor Hallowell Abbott
- Produced by: Adolph Zukor
- Starring: Marguerite Clark; Mahlon Hamilton
- Cinematography: H. Lyman Broening
- Distributed by: Paramount Pictures
- Release date: April 16, 1916
- Running time: 50 minutes
- Country: United States
- Language: Silent film. (English intertitles)

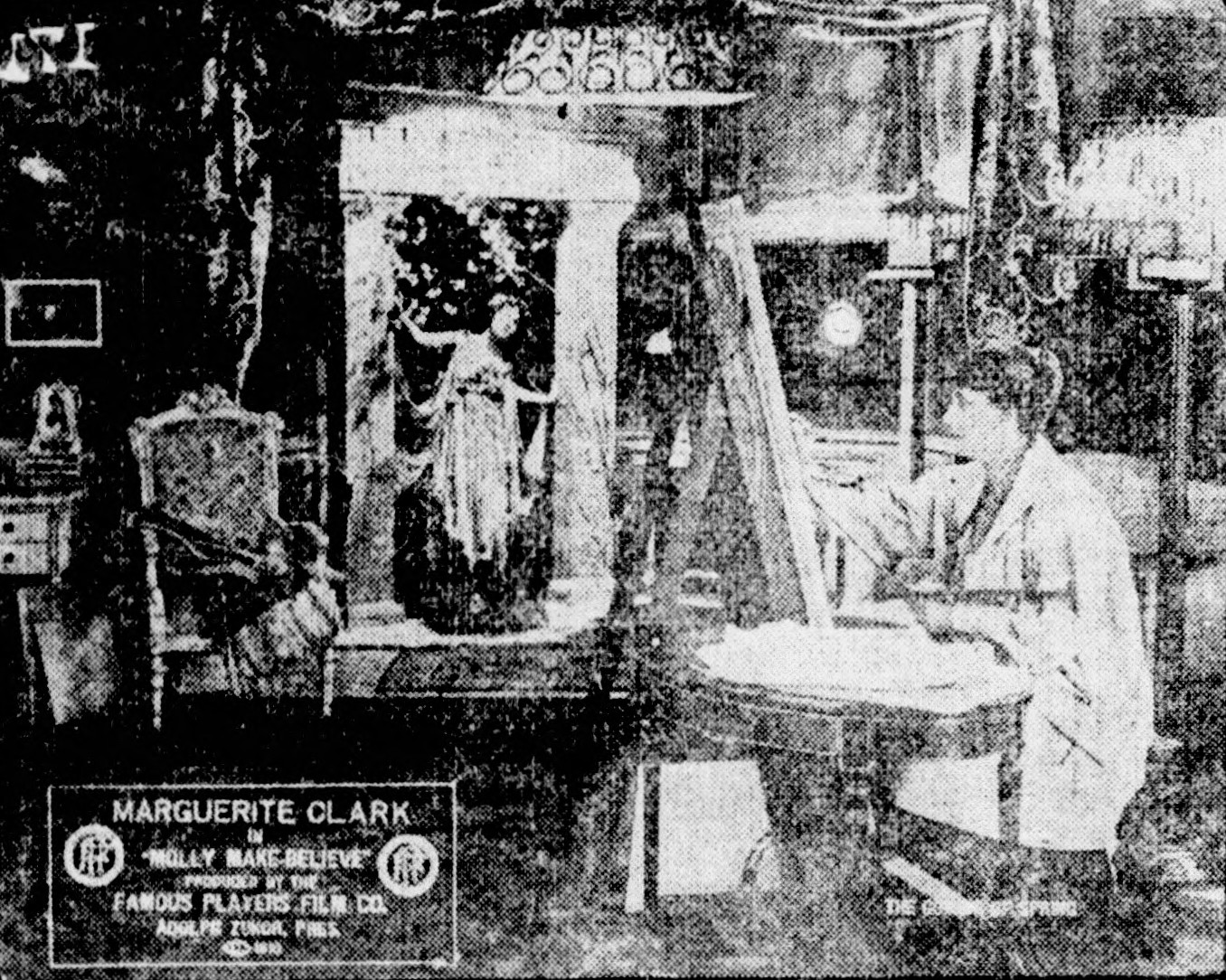
Scene from the film

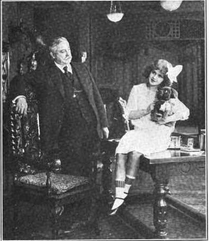
A scene with Marguerite Clark

Molly Make-Believe is a 1916 American silent drama film directed by J. Searle Dawley and starring Marguerite Clark. It was produced by Famous Players–Lasky and distributed by Paramount Pictures. It is based on a 1910 novel, Molly Make-Believe by Eleanor Hallowell Abbott, which was quite popular at the time. The film is now considered lost.

== Cast ==
- Marguerite Clark - Molly
- Mahlon Hamilton - Carl Stanton
- Dick Gray - Bobby Meredith (*as Master Dick Gray)
- Helen Dahl - Cornelia Bartlett
- Gertrude Norman - Grandmother Meredith
- Kate Lester -
- J. W. Johnston - Sam Rogers
- Edwin Mordant - Mr. Wendell
