= Uncle Tom's Cabin (1918 film) =

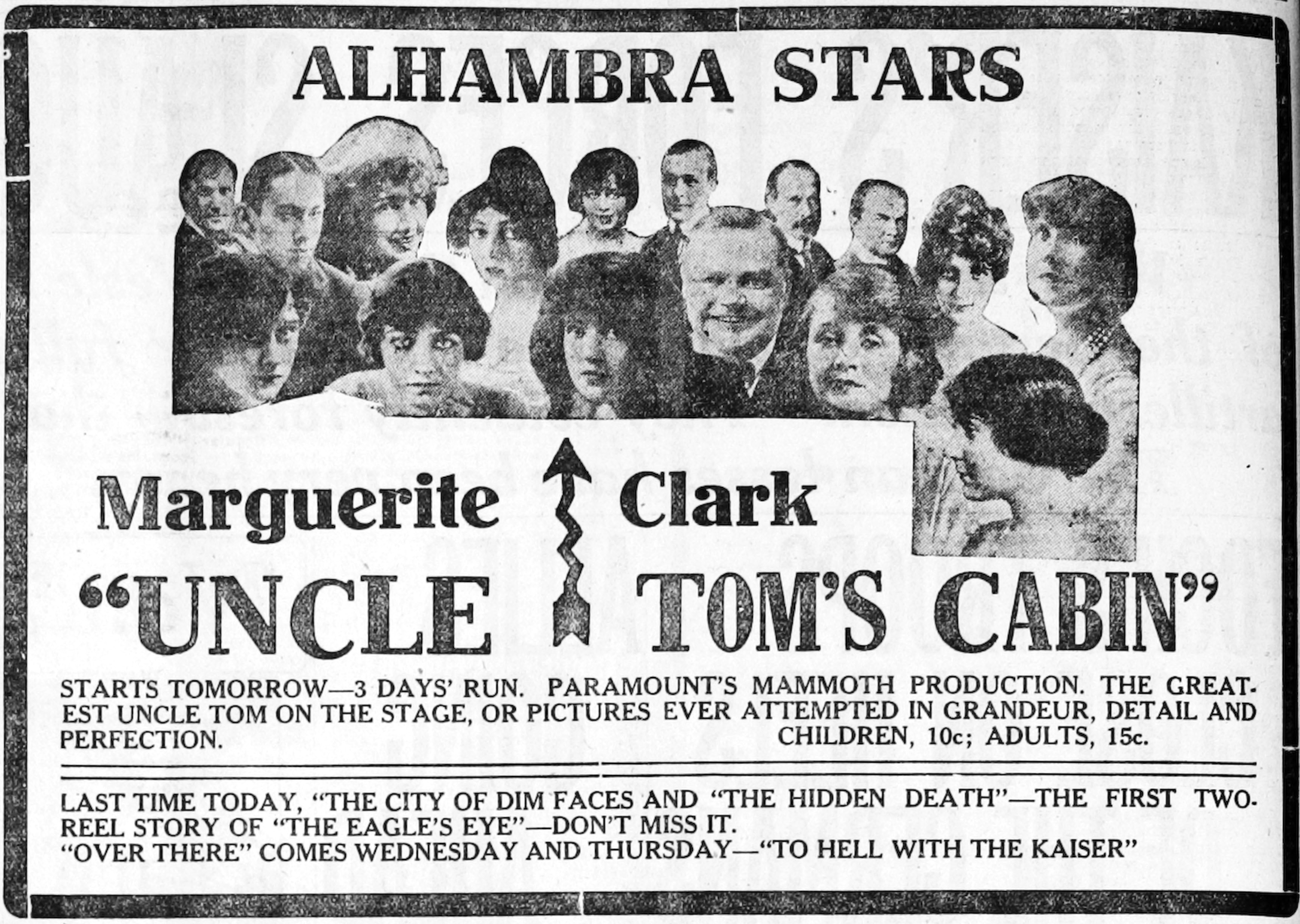
- Newspaper advertisement
- Directed by: J. Searle Dawley
- Written by: J. Searle Dawley
- Based on: Uncle Tom's Cabin by Harriet Beecher Stowe Uncle Tom's Cabin by George Aiken
- Produced by: Adolph Zukor; Jesse L. Lasky
- Starring: Marguerite Clark; Frank Losee
- Cinematography: H. Lyman Broening
- Production company: Famous Players–Lasky Corporation
- Distributed by: Paramount Pictures
- Release date: July 15, 1918
- Running time: 5 reels
- Country: United States
- Language: Silent (English intertitles)

Uncle Tom's Cabin is a 1918 American silent drama film directed by J. Searle Dawley, produced by Famous Players–Lasky Corporation and distributed by Paramount Pictures under the Famous Players–Lasky name. The film is based on Harriet Beecher Stowe's 1852 novel Uncle Tom's Cabin and George Aiken's eponymous play.

Uncle Tom's Cabin starred Marguerite Clark, who portrayed both Topsy and Little Eva. It is now considered to be a lost film.

== Plot ==
As described in a film magazine, Uncle Tom is an old slave living on George Shelby's plantation in Kentucky. Along with Uncle Tom, are Eliza and her son Jim Crow. Shelby is in great debt, and although he doesn't want to, he must sell Uncle Tom and Jim to a slave trader. Eliza hears that this is happening and decides to run away. She manages to escape by crossing an icy river despite being chased by bloodhounds.

While this is happening, a farmer named St. Clair and his daughter Eva have decided to visit their old southern family home. It just happens that Uncle Tom is placed on the same steam boat as St. Clair. Eva is not in the best state of health, and during the boat ride she falls off. However, Uncle Tom saves her, and by Eva's request, Uncle Tom is bought by the St. Clair's. At the St. Clair home Uncle Tom is treated very well and is even brought gifts by Eva. At one point St. Clair saves a slave named Topsy from a terrible master.

Eva continues to grow more ill, and in a dying wish asks for Uncle Tom to be freed. St. Clair agrees but shortly after he also dies, so Uncle Tom and a slave named Emelin are sold at auction to Simon Legree. Legree is a ruthless slave owner, and because of this Emelin and a slave named Cassy decide to run away. They tell Uncle Tom to come with them but he refuses. Legree commands Tom to tell him where they have gone but Uncle Tom refuses to tell. Uncle Tom is beaten nearly to death, but Cassy has actually not yet run away. She witnesses this brutality and kills Legree as he goes to his room. Just as Tom is dying, Shelby comes to buy back him, but he is too late and Uncle Tom dies.

== Cast ==
- Marguerite Clark (in blackface) as Little Eva St. Clair / Topsy
- Sam Hardy as Simon Legree
- Jack W. Johnston as Haley
- Florence Carpenter as Eliza Harris
- Frank Losee as Uncle Tom
- Phil Ryley as Marks
- Harry Lee as Jeff
- Walter P. Lewis as Simon Legree (credited as Walter Lewis)
- Augusta Anderson as Mrs. St. Clair
- Ruby Hoffman as Cassy
- Susanne Willis as Aunt Chloe
- Mrs. Priestly Morrison as Ophelia (credited as Mrs. Priestley Morrison)
- Thomas Carnahan Jr. as George Shelby Jr.
- Jere Austin as George Harris
- Henry Stanford as Mr. St. Clair

== Production notes ==
The film's star, Marguerite Clark, portrayed both Little Eva and Topsy in the film. In order to present both characters on the screen at the same time, the filmmakers used the process of double exposure.

One important aspect of this movie is the use of blackface and its perception by the actors. Based on archival records the use of blackface was looked at as an impressive use of makeup. For instance, Frank Losee at one point had his makeup done while in a hotel and a passerby did not realize he was in fact white. He commented on this saying, “... one of most cherished memories, because it pays an unconscious tribute to my make-up”. Likewise, film magazines describe Clark as having impeccable makeup, even saying “Marguerite Clark will fool you with her make-up”.

The early scenes involving Eliza's escape are filmed in New York City and Maine. This is notably due to the cold climate, as the scenes involved an Eliza being chased by dogs across a frozen river. One magazine made particular note of the use of real Bloodhounds and Great Danes for this scene. The boat scene of the movie was filmed in New Orleans, Louisiana. Famous Players Lasky chartered their own steam boat for these scenes. It is said that during production, director Dawley had worries of Clark, the star actress, being able to swim properly in the river. Later, to depict the St. Clairs mansion, filming took place at Jackson Barracks in the Colonel's quarters. Finally, the slave market was filmed outside of the St. Louis hotel.

In an interview with Losee, he details some notable events about the production. He noted that working alongside star Marguerite Clark was especially enjoyable. He also made mention of Clark's swim scene and worried that he may not be able to properly save her from the river as he was supposed to. He noted that one scene was filmed outside the home of some very old men. Once the men recognized that they were filming Uncle Tom’s Cabin they began to get angry. Losee notes that the general reception of the south was very positive, but they just happened to run across a few men that were against the message of the movie.

== Reception ==
Like many American films of the time, Uncle Tom's Cabin was subject to cuts by city and state film censorship boards. For example, the Chicago Board of Censors required cuts of two offensive intertitles, in Reel 1, "A nigger is only a nigger" and, Reel 2, "Do you allow her to embrace niggers that way?"

Despite reviews being polarized, there is an overwhelming consensus towards positive reception. One critic says, “It’s [sic] drawing power astounded me, it proved a real record breaker." Another noted that the steamboat and river scenes, some of the most famous moments of the novel, could not have been portrayed more realistically. Many say that the film's double feature was very well done. Along those lines, a lot of the praise is pointed towards Marguerite Clark.

== See also ==
- List of lost films
- List of films featuring slavery
