= Snow White (1916 film) =

1916 American silent romantic fantasy film directed by J. Searle Dawley

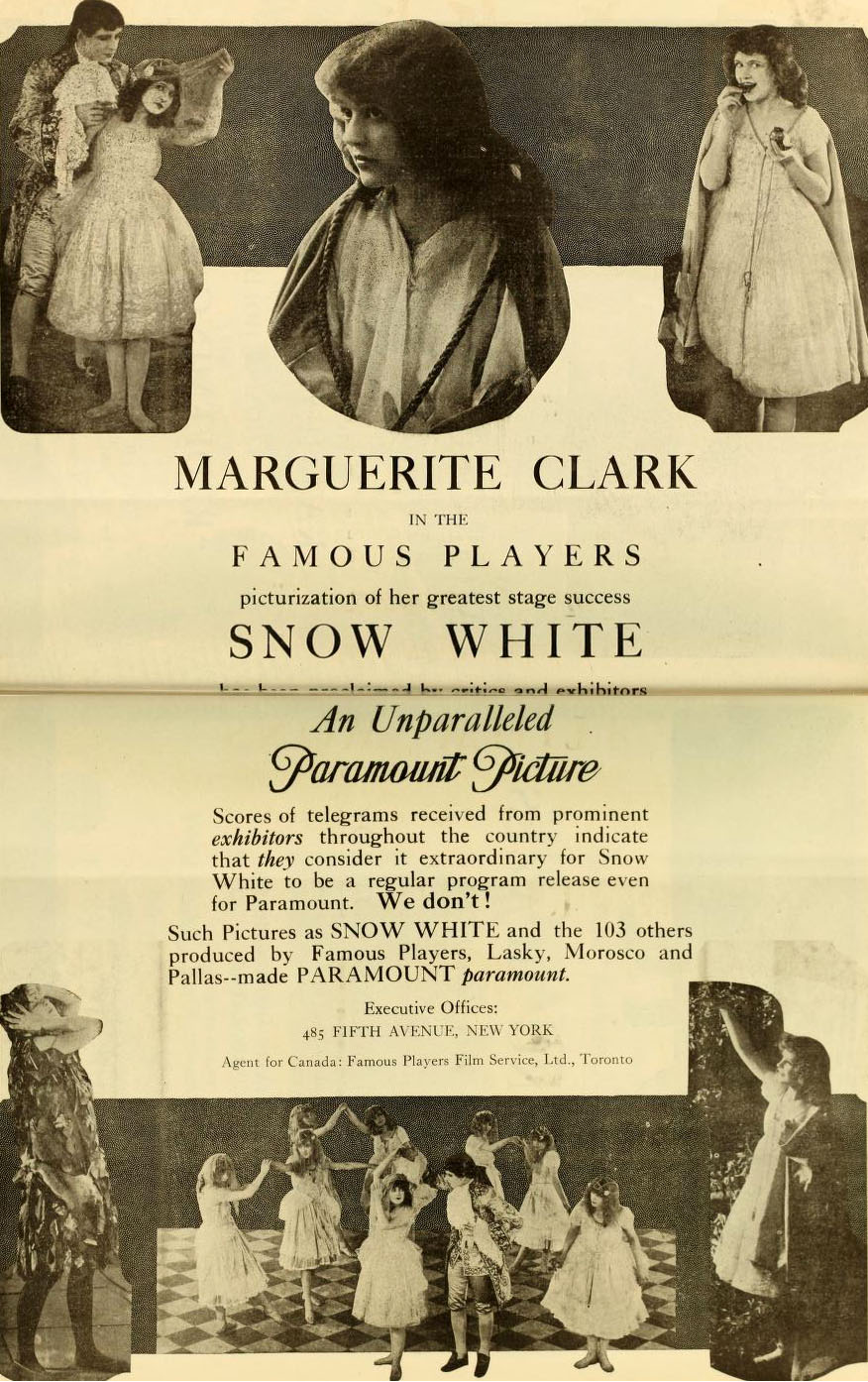
- Advertisement (1917)
- Directed by: J. Searle Dawley
- Written by: Winthrop Ames
- Based on: Snow White as collected by The Brothers Grimm
- Produced by: H. Lyman Broening (uncredited)
- Starring: Marguerite Clark; Creighton Hale
- Cinematography: H. Lyman Broening
- Production company: Famous Players Film Company
- Distributed by: Paramount Pictures
- Release date: December 25, 1916
- Running time: 63 minutes (18 frame/s)
- Country: United States
- Language: Silent (English intertitles)

Snow White, full 63 minute film

Snow White is a 1916 American silent romantic fantasy film directed by J. Searle Dawley. Winthrop Ames adapted it from his own 1912 Broadway play Snow White and the Seven Dwarfs, which was in turn adapted from the 1812 fairy tale (as collected by the Brothers Grimm). The film stars Marguerite Clark and Creighton Hale, Clark reprising her stage role.

Having seen the film at the age of fifteen, Walt Disney was inspired to use the Brothers Grimm fairy tale as the subject of his first feature-length animated film in 1937.

== Cast ==
- Marguerite Clark as Snow White
- Creighton Hale as Prince Florimond
- Dorothy Cumming as Queen Brangomar
- Lionel Braham as Berthold the Huntsman
- Alice Washburn as Witch Hex (*see below)
- Richard Barthelmess as Pie Man
- Arthur Donaldson as King
- Irwin Emmer as Dwarf
- Billy Platt as Dwarf
- Herbert Rice as Dwarf
- Jimmy Rosen as Dwarf

uncredited

- May Robson as Witch Hex (she replaced originally scheduled Alice Washburn)
- Kate Lester as a dowager queen

== Preservation status ==
Formerly thought to have been destroyed in a vault fire and presumed lost, a "substantially complete" print with Dutch intertitles, missing a few scenes, was found in Amsterdam in 1992 and restored at George Eastman House.

== Home media ==
Snow White is included in the boxed DVD set Treasures from American Film Archives: 50 Preserved Films (2000).

== See also ==
- 1916 in film
- List of films about witchcraft
- List of rediscovered films
