= The Pretty Sister of Jose (film) =

1915 film by Allan Dwan

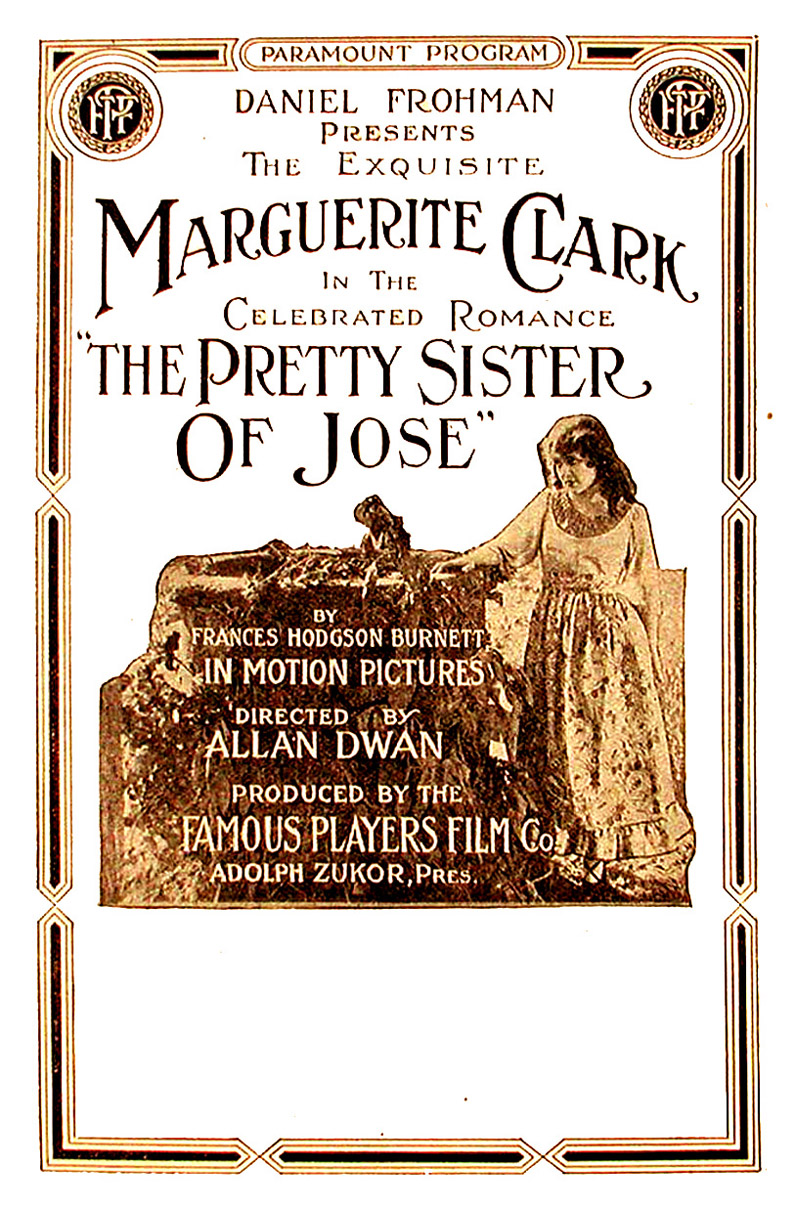
- 1915 lobby poster
- Directed by: Allan Dwan
- Written by: Allan Dwan
- Based on: The Pretty Sister of Jose by Frances Hodgson Burnett
- Starring: Marguerite Clark
- Cinematography: H. Lyman Broening
- Production company: Famous Players
- Distributed by: Paramount Pictures
- Release date: May 31, 1915
- Running time: 5 reels
- Country: United States
- Languages: Silent; English intertitles

The Pretty Sister of Jose was a 1915 American silent romantic drama written and directed by Allan Dwan, and distributed by Paramount Pictures. Based on Frances Hodgson Burnett's 1889 novel of the same name and the 1903 stage play starring Maude Adams, the film starred Marguerite Clark and Jack Pickford. The Pretty Sister of Jose is now presumed lost.

== Cast ==
- Marguerite Clark as Pepita
- Jack Pickford as Jose
- Edythe Chapman as Their Mother
- Gertrude Norman as Their Grandmother
- William Lloyd as The Padre
- Rupert Julian as Sebastiano
- Teddy Sampson as Sarita
- Dick Rosson as Manuel

== See also ==
- List of lost films
