= Rich Man, Poor Man (film) =

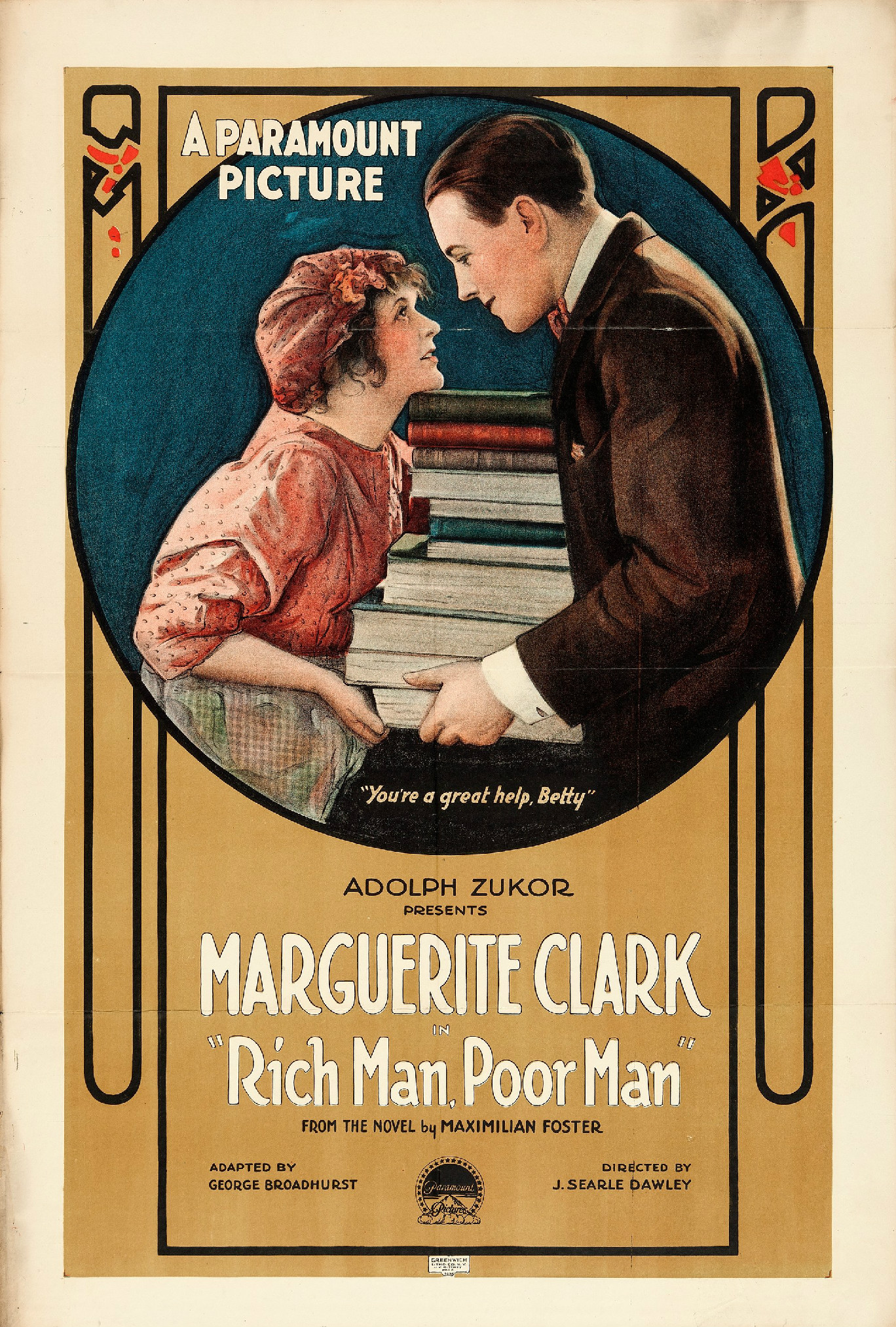
- Lobby poster
- Directed by: J. Searle Dawley
- Written by: J. Searle Dawley; Tom Bret (titles); Maximilian Foster
- Based on: Rich Man, Poor Man by George Broadhurst
- Produced by: Adolph Zukor; Jesse Lasky
- Starring: Marguerite Clark; Richard Barthelmess
- Cinematography: H. Lyman Broening
- Distributed by: Paramount Pictures
- Release date: April 22, 1918
- Running time: 5 reels
- Country: United States
- Language: Silent (English intertitles)

Rich Man, Poor Man is a lost 1918 American silent romantic drama film starring Marguerite Clark and directed by J. Searle Dawley. It is based on a 1916 Broadway play by George Broadhurst. It was produced by Famous Players–Lasky and distributed by Paramount Pictures.

== Plot ==
As described in a film magazine, following the death of her mother, Betty Wynne becomes the drudge of the boarding house until one of her friends introduces her as the missing grandchild of John K. Beeston. When the deception is discovered, Betty has made such an impression Beeston that he insists that she remain, and since the man she loves is the real missing heir, she quite readily consents to becoming a member of the household.

== Cast ==
- Marguerite Clark as Betty Wynne
- Richard Barthelmess as Bayard Varick
- George Backus as Henry Mapelson
- Frederick Warde as John K. Beeston
- J. W. Herbert as De Courcey Lloyd
- Augusta Anderson as Mrs. De Courcey Lloyd
- William Wadsworth as Henry Evans
- Ottola Nesmith as Mrs. Wynne
- Mary Davis as Mrs. Tilney
- Winter Hall
