= Come Out of the Kitchen =

1919 lost silent film directed by John S. Robertson

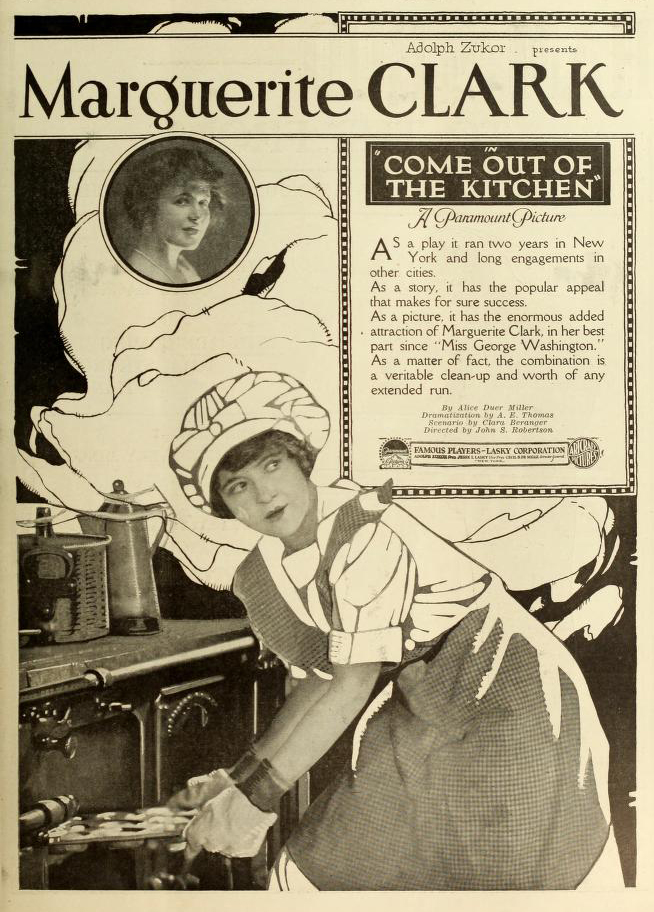
- Advertisement
- Directed by: John S. Robertson; Frank Walton
- Written by: Clara Beranger (scenario)
- Based on: Come Out of the Kitchen, a 1916 play by A. E. Thomas
- Produced by: Adolph Zukor; Jesse Lasky
- Starring: Marguerite Clark
- Cinematography: Jacques Monteran (fr); Hal Young
- Distributed by: Paramount Pictures
- Release date: May 11, 1919
- Running time: 5 reels
- Country: United States
- Language: Silent (English intertitles)

Come Out of the Kitchen is a 1919 American silent comedy film produced by Famous Players–Lasky and distributed by Paramount Pictures. It was directed by John S. Robertson and starred Marguerite Clark. The film is based on A. E. Thomas's 1916 Broadway play Come Out of the Kitchen which starred Ruth Chatterton. It in turn was adapted from the novel of the same name by Alice Duer Miller.

Parts of the film was shot at Pass Christian, Mississippi.

== Plot ==
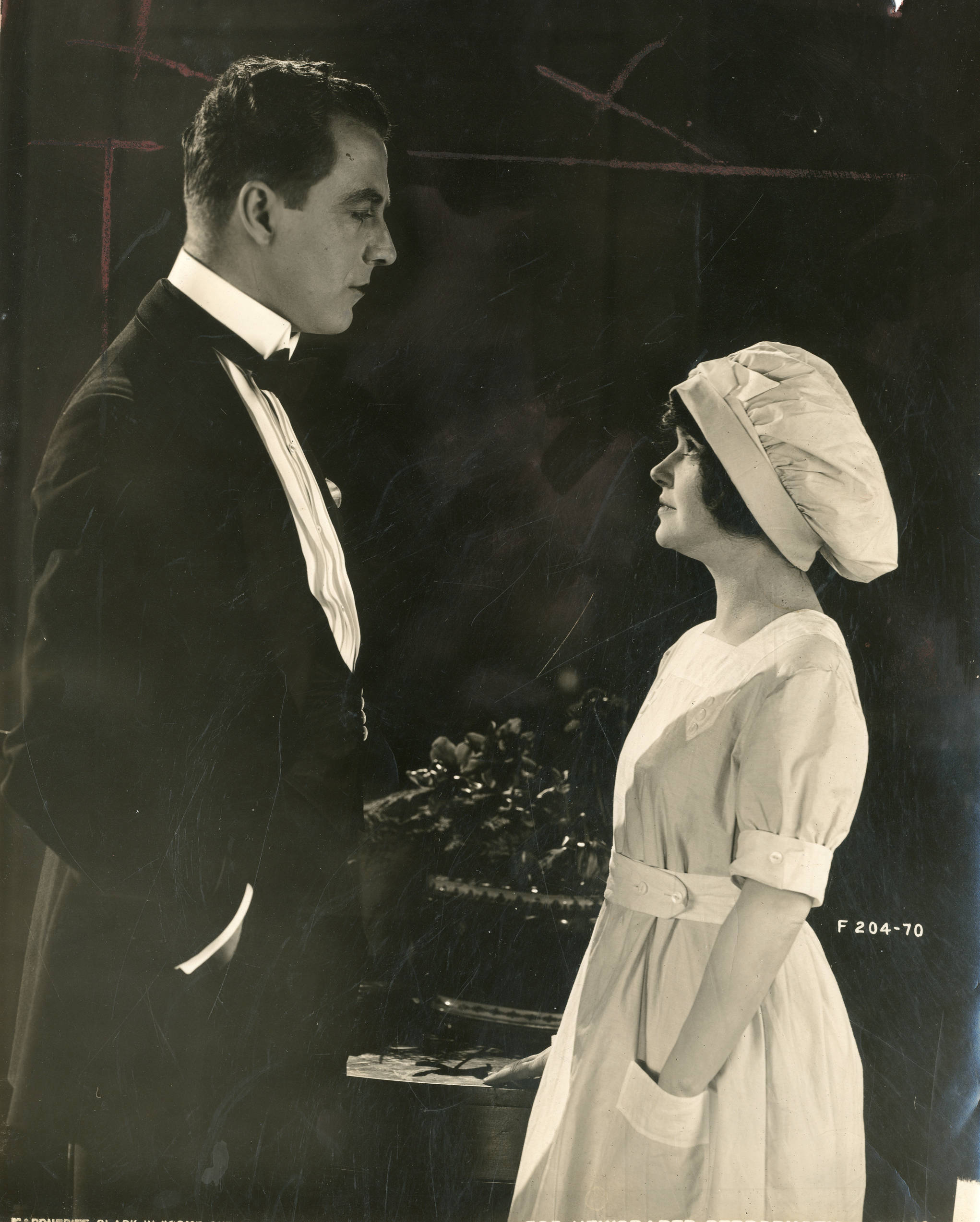
Eugene O'Brien and Marguerite Clark in Come Out of the Kitchen

As described in a film magazine, Claudia Daingerfield is the resourceful daughter of an old and invalid Southern aristocrat Mr. Daingerfield. All that remains of his property is a fine old Virginian country house, barely maintained by Claudia, her sister Elizabeth, her brothers Paul and Charles, and their African-American cook Mammy Jackson, who is still loyal to the household. When father goes North to consult a great physician, there is no money left when news comes that a costly operation must be performed. There is only one way this expense can be met, and that is by accepting an offer by Northerner Burton Crane for temporary lease and occupation of the fine house for $3,000, though he insists on having only white servants. As a result, the members of the former high-born Southern family take the servant positions, with Claudia as cook, her sister Elizabeth as maid, and her brothers as a butler and general worker. Then ensues a comedy with the family performing domestic service to people less kind and appreciative, with Claudia struggling in an attempt to cook for the entire family until she is forced to call upon the services of Mammy Jackson and keep her out of sight with various devices. Claudia steers through this situation while fascinating the Northerners staying at the house. Burton Crane slowly falls in love with her and seriously thinks of taking her out of the kitchen, thinking she is a wonderful cook. He comes across a miniature of her, but when it disappears he accuses the older brother of stealing it and has him discharged. One by one the members of the family who took positions as servants are discharged until only Claudia remains. After a telegram arrives stating that her father has survived the dangerous operation causes Claudia to falter, and Burton discovers what has been going on. Impressed with her resourcefulness, Burton asks her to become his wife.

== Cast ==
- Marguerite Clark as Claudia Daingerfield
- Frances Kaye as Elizabeth Daingerfield
- Bradley Barker as Paul Daingerfield
- Albert Hackett as Charles Daingerfield
- George Stevens as Mr. Daingerfield
- May Kitson as Mrs. Daingerfield
- Eugene O'Brien as Burton Crane
- Fred Esmelton as Solon Tucker
- Crauford Kent as Randolf Weeks
- Augusta Anderson as Mrs. Faulkner
- Rita Spear as Cora Faulkner
- Frances Miller as Mammy Jackson
- George Washington as Snowball

== Preservation ==
With no prints of Come Out of the Kitchen located in any film archives, it is considered a lost film.
