= Snow White and the Seven Dwarfs (1912 play) =

Broadway play by Winthrop Ames

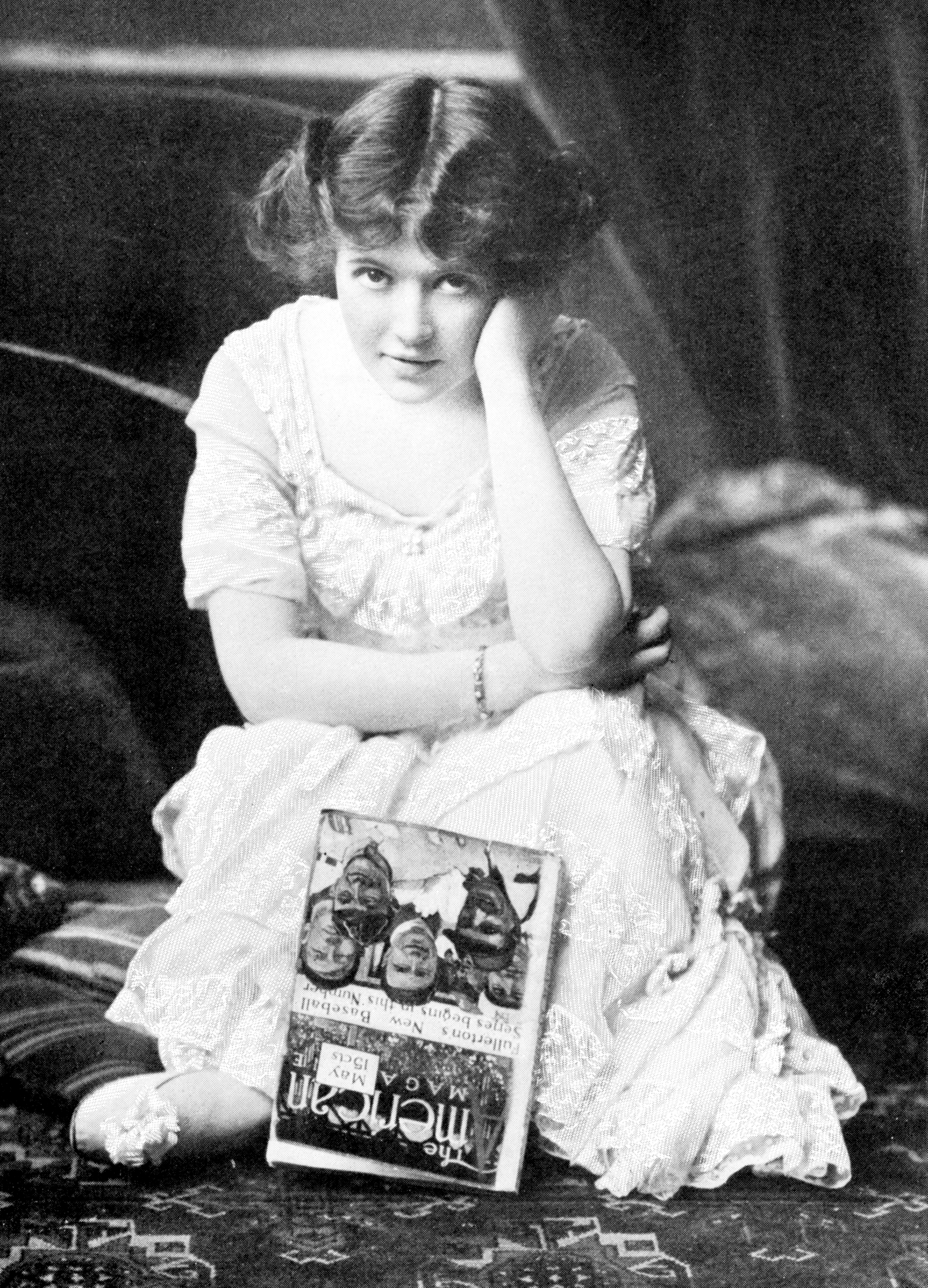
Marguerite Clark while starring in Winthrop Ames' stage production Snow White and the Seven Dwarfs

Snow White and the Seven Dwarfs is a Broadway play that debuted at the Little Theatre on West 44th Street, New York City, on October 31, 1912. Based on the stories by the Brothers Grimm, it was produced by Winthrop Ames who had written it under the pseudonym "Jessie Braham White". The play, starring Marguerite Clark, was met with favorable reviews and became the basis for the 1916 film Snow White, also starring Clark.

== Cast of characters (opening night) ==
- Princess Snow White : Marguerite Clark
- Queen Brangomar : Elaine Inescort
- Rosalys : Madeline Fairbanks
- Amelotte : Harriot Ingalls
- Ermengarde : Jeannette Dix
- Guinivere : Dorothy Preyer
- Christabel : Marion Fairbanks
- Astolaine : Madelaine Chieff
- Ursula : Walden
- Lynette : Phyllis Anderson
- Sir Dandiprat Bombas, the Court Chamberlain : Frank McCormack
- Berthold, the Huntsman : Arthur Barry
- Prince Florimond of Calydon : Donald Gallaher
- Valentine : Peter Miller
- Vivian : Royal Herring
- The Seven Dwarfs Scene 3
1. Blick, the eldest of the seven : Edward See
2. Flick : Harry Burnham
3. Glick : Marie Cullen
4. Snick : Emmet Hampton
5. Plick : Charles Everett
6. Whick : John Davis
7. Quee, the youngest "boy" of the seven, nearly ninety-nine years old with an apparent chronic thievery issue : Dorothy Farrier
- Witch Hex : Ada Boshell
- Long Tail : William Grey
- Short Tail : Patrick Driscoll
- Lack Tail : Arthur Simpson

== See also ==
- Snow White (1916 film)
