= Heléne of the North =

1915 film by J. Searle Dawley

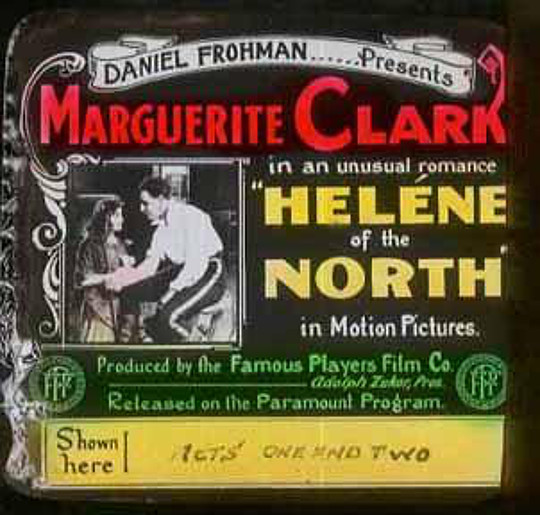
- Lantern slide
- Directed by: J. Searle Dawley
- Written by: J. Searle Dawley
- Produced by: Adolph Zukor; Daniel Frohman
- Starring: Marguerite Clark; Elliott Dexter; Conway Tearle
- Cinematography: H. Lyman Broening
- Distributed by: Paramount Pictures
- Release date: August 19, 1915
- Running time: 5 reels
- Country: US
- Languages: Silent film English intertitles

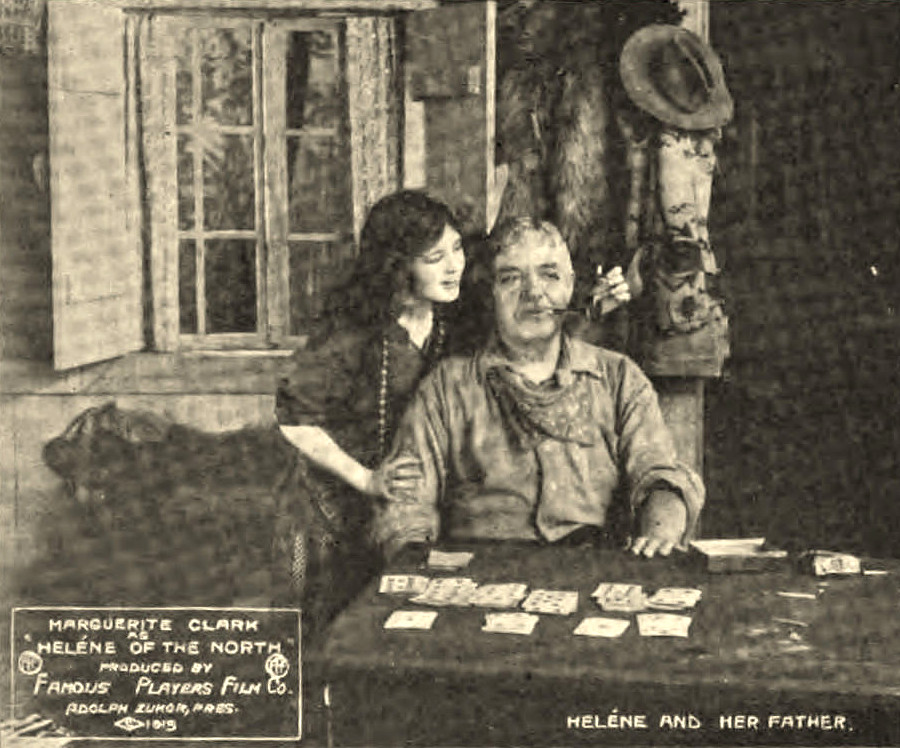
Lobby card

Heléne of the North is a lost 1915 American silent romantic drama film directed by J. Searle Dawley and starring Marguerite Clark, Elliott Dexter and Conway Tearle. Adolph Zukor produced.

== Cast ==
- Marguerite Clark - Heléne Dearing
- Conway Tearle - Ralph Connell, a.k.a. Lord Traverse
- Elliott Dexter - Pierre
- Robert Rogers - Captain Westforth
- Kathryn Adams - Miss Cadwell
- Frank Losee - John Dearing
- David Wall - Father Duvall
- Ida Darling - Mrs. O'Neill
- Theodore Guise - Colonel O'Neill
- James Kearney - Philip Brookes
- Brigham Royce - Wild Buffalo
- Eleanor Flowers - Whispering Grass
