= H. Lyman Broening =

American cinematographer (1882–1983)

Henry Lyman Broening
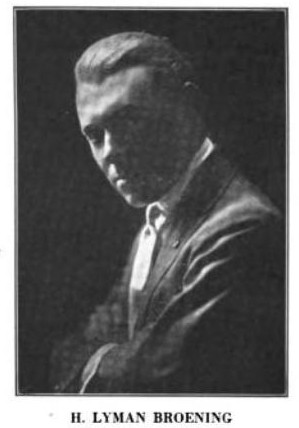
- 1918 portrait
- Born: June 30, 1882
- Died: June 30, 1983 (aged 101)
- Occupation: Cinematographer

Henry Lyman Broening (June 30, 1882 - June 6, 1983) was a well known American cinematographer. Later, he was also on the editorial board of American Cinematographer magazine. He worked on films that include May Blossom (1915) and wrote about the beginnings of the ASC.

== Biography ==
He was born on June 30, 1882. He served on the board of governors for the American Society of Cinematographers in 1922.

He died on June 6, 1983, in Hesperia, California.

== Partial filmography ==
- In the Bishop's Carriage (1913)
- Chelsea 7750 (1913)
- Caprice (1913)
- Leah Kleschna (1913)
- The Lost Paradise (1914)
- Marta of the Lowlands (1914)
- Wildflower (1914)
- The County Chairman (1914)
- The Conspiracy (1914)
- The Dancing Girl (1915)
- May Blossom (1915)
- The Pretty Sister of Jose (1915)
- Helene of the North (1915)
- Still Waters (1915)
- Mice and Men (1916)
- Molly Make-Believe (1916)
- Silks and Satins (1916)
- Miss George Washington (1916)
- Snow White (1916)
- The Valentine Girl (1917)
- Bab's Burglar (1917)
- Bab's Matinee Idol (1917)
- The Seven Swans (1917)
- The Lie (1918)
- Rich Man, Poor Man (1918)
- Uncle Tom's Cabin (1918)
- The Forbidden City (1918)
- The Better Half (1918)
- The Scoffer (1920)
- In the Heart of a Fool (1920)
- A Broken Doll (1921)
- A Perfect Crime (1921)
- Kindred of the Dust (1922)
- The Dramatic Life of Abraham Lincoln (1924)
- The Lighthouse by the Sea (1924)
- Wandering Footsteps (1925)
- Fighting Fate (1925)
- Rose of the Tenements (1926)
- Dancing Days (1926)
- The Truthful Sex (1926)
- California or Bust (1927)
