= Silks and Satins =

1916 silent film directed by J. Searle Dawley

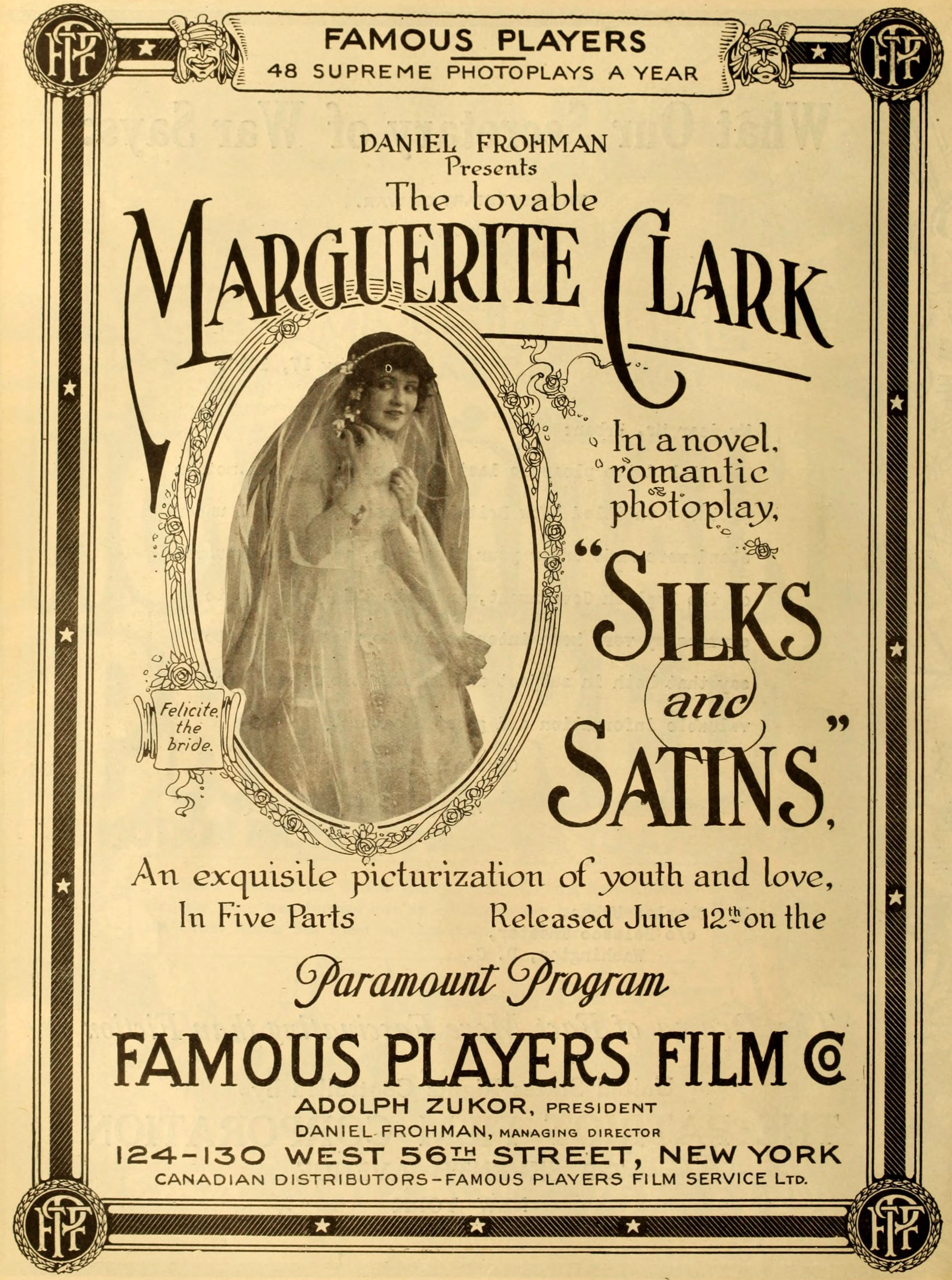
- Period lobby poster
- Directed by: J. Searle Dawley
- Written by: Betty T. Fitzgerald; Hugh Ford
- Produced by: Adolph Zukor
- Starring: Marguerite Clark
- Cinematography: H. Lyman Broening
- Distributed by: Paramount Pictures
- Release date: June 12, 1916
- Running time: 5 reels
- Country: United States
- Language: Silent (English intertitles)

Silks and Satins is a 1916 American silent romance film produced by the Famous Players Film Company and distributed by Paramount Pictures. It starred Marguerite Clark and was directed by J. Searle Dawley.

It was filmed at Palisades, New Jersey. A preserved film is at the British Film Institute, London.

== Cast ==
- Marguerite Clark as Felicite
- Vernon Steele as Jacques Desmond
- Clarence Handyside as Marquis
- William A. Williams as Henri (credited as W.A. Williams)
- Thomas Holding as Felix Breton
- Fayette Perry as Annette
