= Augusta Anderson =

Swedish actress

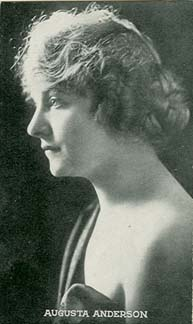
- Anderson in 1917
- Born: Augusta Arvida Kind; November 7, 1875; Oberga, Sweden
- Died: December 18, 1951 (aged 76); Santa Monica, California, U.S.
- Occupation: Actress
- Years active: 1914-1937
- Spouse: Andy Anderson

Augusta Anderson (7 November 1875 – 18 December 1951) was a Swedish film actress who appeared in several American films from 1914 to 1937. She was married to Keystone comedian and assistant director Andy Anderson. She was born in Öberga, Sweden and died in Santa Monica, California, U.S.

== Selected filmography ==
- Classmates (1914)
- The Rainbow Princess (1916)
- The Seven Swans (1917)
- Rich Man, Poor Man (1918)
- Uncle Tom's Cabin (1918)
- Come Out of the Kitchen (1919)
- The Career of Katherine Bush (1919)
- Sinners (1920)
- Guilty of Love (1920)
- A Romantic Adventuress (1920)
- The Blasphemer (1921)
- Smashing the Vice Trust (1937)
