= Alice Washburn =

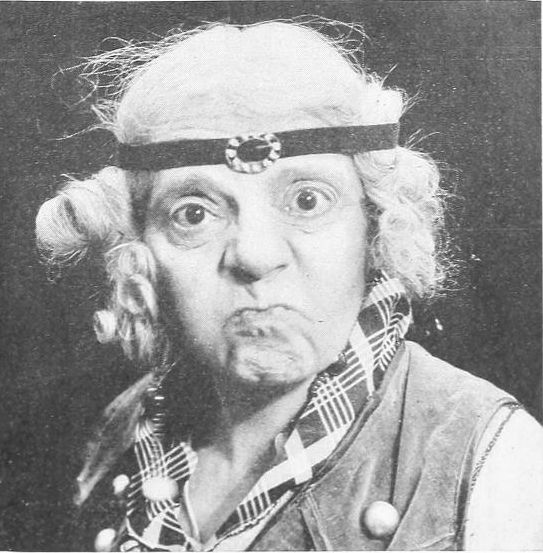
- Washburn making a funny face, 1916 or later portrait (Vitagraph Studios)
- Born: September 12, 1860; Oshkosh, Wisconsin, U.S.
- Died: November 18, 1929 (aged 69); Oshkosh, Wisconsin, U.S.
- Resting place: Riverside Cemetery; Oshkosh, Wisconsin, U.S.
- Occupation: actress
- Years active: 1911-16

Alice Washburn (1860–1929) was an American stage and film actress. She worked at the Edison, Vitagraph and Kalem studios. A historic aspect of her time in films has her appearing in some of the Edison sound shorts of 1913. Some have been preserved and demonstrated in recent years such as Jack's Joke where Washburn speaks. Her final film Snow White was her only known feature film. She died of heart attack in November 1929.

== Selected filmography ==
- Mr. Bumptious, Detective (1911)*short
- Father's Dress Suit (1911)*short
- Logan's Babies (1911)*short
- The Bo'Sun's Watch (1911)*short
- The Troubles of A. Butler (1911)*short
- John Brown's Heir (1911)
- Stage-Struck Lizzie (1911)*short
- Uncle Hiram's List (1911)*short
- The Two Flats (1912)*short
- Freezing Auntie (1912)*short
- Max and Maurice (1912)*short
- Hogan's Alley (1912)*short
- The Little Delicatessen Store (1912)*short
- Her Polished Family (1912)*short
- Percival Chubbs and the Widow (1912)*short
- How Patrick's Eyes Were Opened (1912)*short
- Aunt Miranda's Cat (1912)*short
- Very Much Engaged (1912)*short
- The Vision in the Window (1914)*short
- Lo! The Poor Indian (1914)*short
- Martha's Rebellion (1914)*short
- The Voice of Silence (1914)*short
- Mr. Jack Goes Into Business (1916)*short
- Mr. Jack Hires a Stenographer (1916)*short
- His Dukeship, Mr. Jack (1916)*short
- Kernel Nutt, the Janitor (1916)*short
- Kernel Nutt Wins a Wife (1916)*short
- Kernel Nutt, the Footman (1916)*short
- Kernel Nutt and the Hundred Dollar Bill (1916)*short
- Kernel Nutt in Mexico (1916)*short
- Kernel Nutt's Musical Shirt (1916)*short
- Kernel Nutt Flirts with Wifie (1916)*short
- Kernel Nutt and High Shoes (1916)*short
- Snow White (1916)
