= Mice and Men (film) =

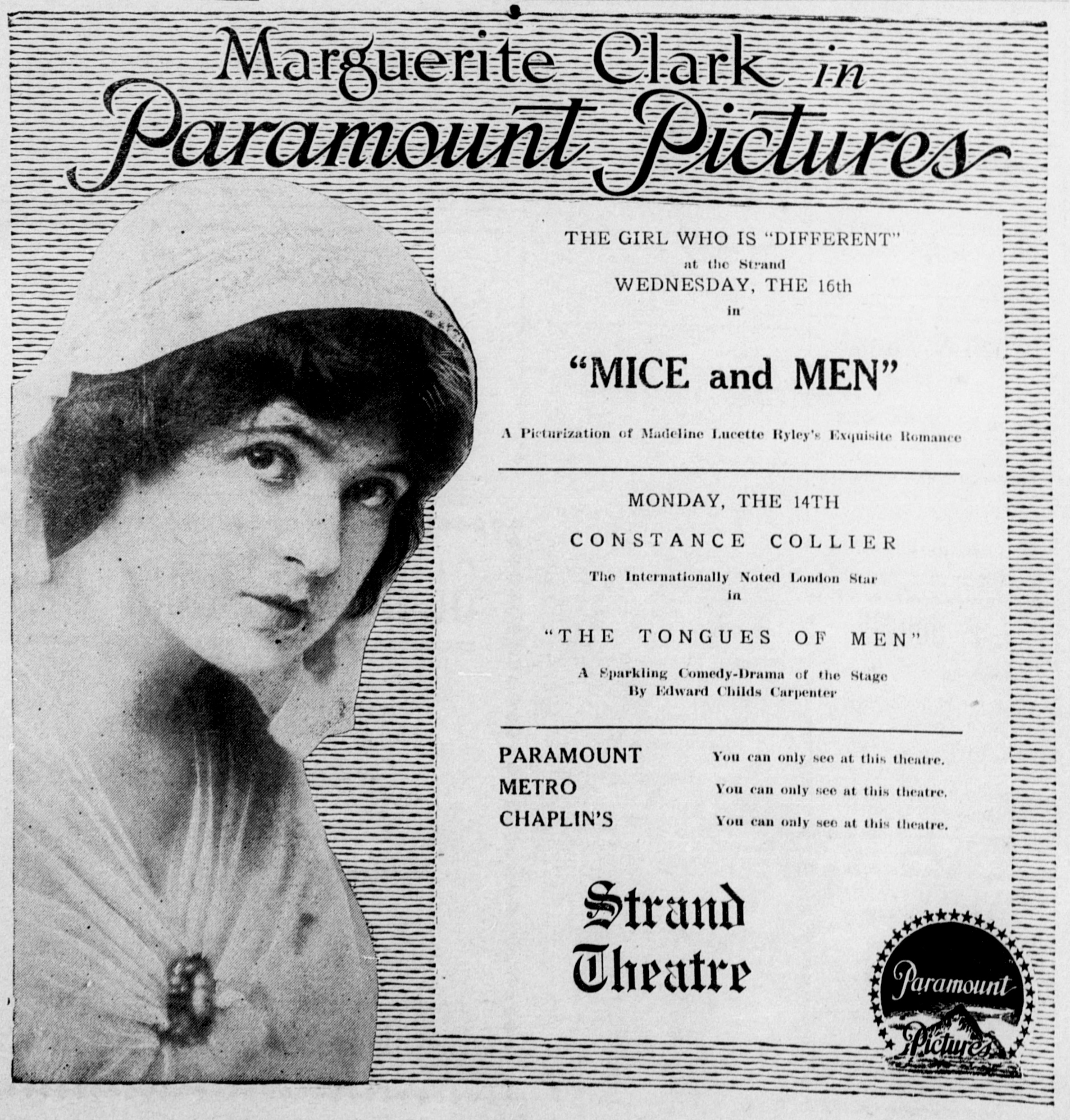
- Film's promotion in 1916 newspaper
- Directed by: J. Searle Dawley
- Written by: Hugh Ford (scenario)
- Based on: Mice and Men; 1901 play by Madeleine Lucette Ryley
- Produced by: Daniel Frohman
- Starring: Marguerite Clark
- Cinematography: H. Lyman Broening
- Production company: Famous Players Film Company
- Distributed by: Paramount Pictures
- Release date: January 10, 1916
- Country: United States
- Languages: Silent film (English intertitles)

Mice and Men is a 1916 American silent romance film directed by J. Searle Dawley, starring Marguerite Clark, and based on a 1901 Broadway play, Mice and Men by Madeleine Lucette Ryley.

== Plot ==
In Virginia, Mark Embury, a rich man, having made desperate attempts to find a wife, decides to raise a young girl he has adopted, Peggy, in order to marry her. But she falls in love with George Lovell, Embury's nephew.

== Cast ==
- Marguerite Clark - Peggy
- Marshall Neilan - Captain George Lovell
- Charles Waldron - Mark Embury
- Clarence Handyside - Roger Goodlake
- Maggie Fisher - Mrs. Deborrah
- Helen Dahl - Joanna
- Robert Conville - Minister Goodlake/Servant to Goodlake
- William McKey - Embury's Servant
- Ada Deaves - Matron
- Francesca Warde - Mammy

== Reception ==
The film was praised in reviews in The Moving Picture World and Motion Picture News.

== Preservation ==
Mic and Men is currently presumed lost. In February of 2021, the film was cited by the National Film Preservation Board on their Lost U.S. Silent Feature Films list.
