= Still Waters (1915 film) =

1915 film by J. Searle Dawley

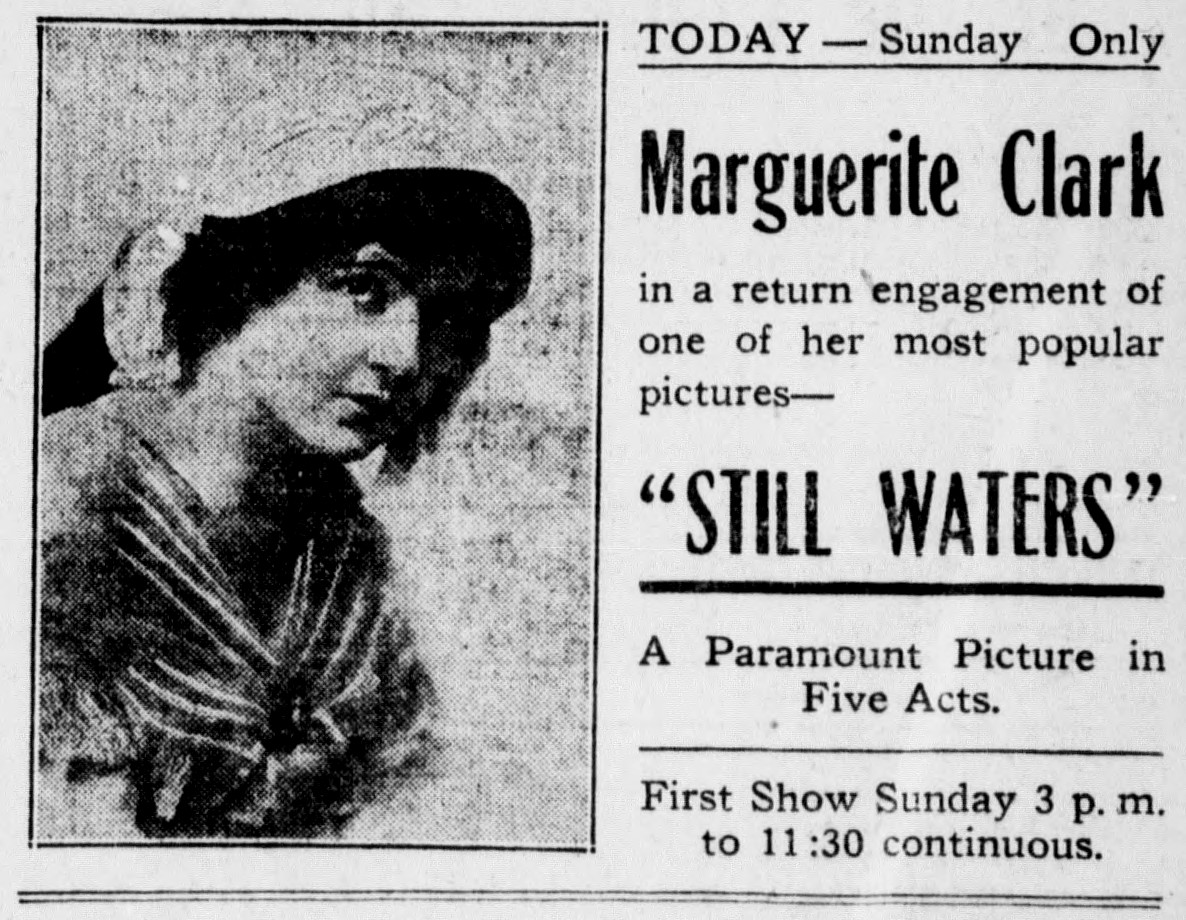
- Directed by: J. Searle Dawley
- Written by: Edith Barnard Delanao (story); Hugh Ford
- Produced by: Adolph Zukor
- Starring: Marguerite Clark
- Cinematography: H. Lyman Broening
- Distributed by: Paramount Pictures
- Release date: November 4, 1915
- Running time: 50 minutes
- Country: United States
- Language: Silent film (English intertitles)

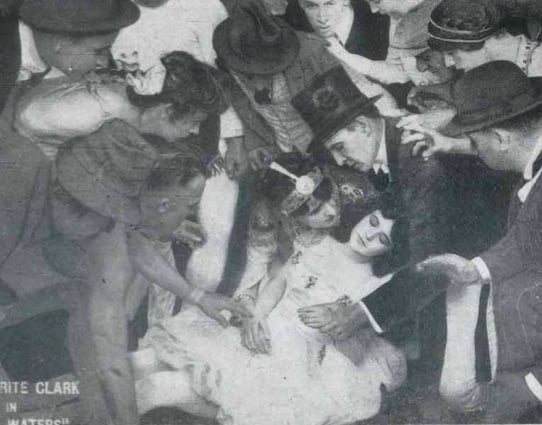
Publicity photo

Still Waters is a 1915 American silent comedy-drama film starring Marguerite Clark and directed by J. Searle Dawley. It was produced by Adolph Zukor's Famous Players Film Company. It was distributed by Paramount Pictures and is now lost.

== Plot ==
Clark plays Nesta the daughter of a canal boat captain. Nesta desires to visit the circus against her father's wishes as a bad experience happened years earlier when the captain's wife ran off with a circus performer. Nesta eventually falls for a performer herself but is at odds with her father.

== Cast ==
- Marguerite Clark as Nesta
- Robert Broderick as Joe Martin
- Philip Tonge as Jed Perkins
- Robert Vaughn as Dr. John Ramsay
- Arthur Evers as Ring Master
- Ottola Nesmith as Drasa La Rue
- Robert Conville as Mike
- Harry La Pearl as Bounding Bonnell
