= The Seven Swans =

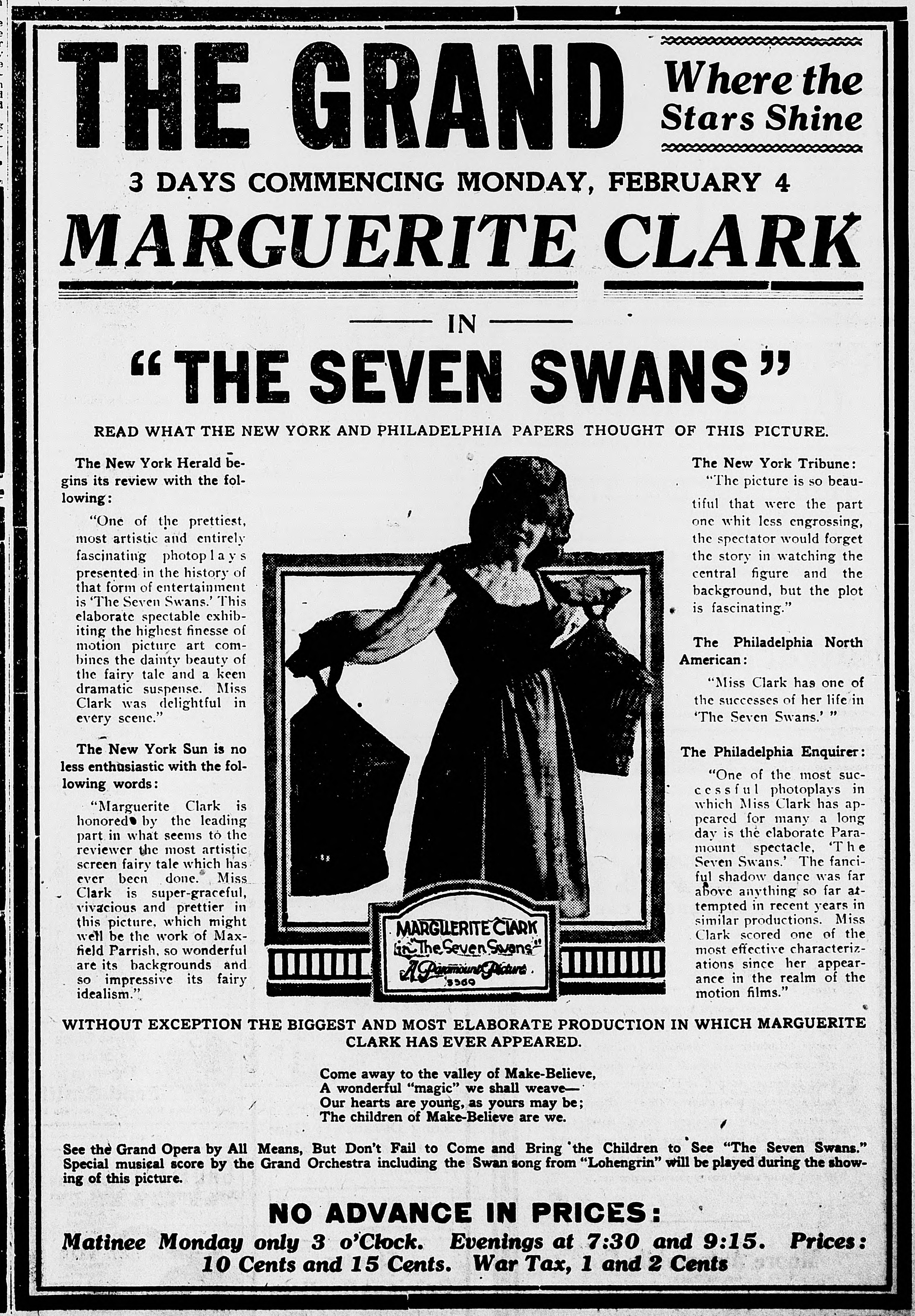
- Newspaper advertisement
- Directed by: J. Searle Dawley
- Written by: J. Searle Dawley
- Based on: The Wild Swans by Hans Christian Andersen
- Produced by: Adolph Zukor
- Starring: Marguerite Clark; Richard Barthelmess
- Cinematography: H. Lyman Broening
- Distributed by: Paramount Pictures
- Release date: December 31, 1917
- Running time: 50 minutes
- Country: USA
- Language: Silent film. (English intertitles)

The Seven Swans is a lost 1917 American silent fantasy film starring Marguerite Clark. Famous Players Film Company produced and J. Searle Dawley directed.

== Plot ==
Loosely based on The Wild Swans by Hans Christian Andersen, Clark stars as Princess Tweedledee who later falls in love with Prince Charming. An evil witch, yearning to take over a kingdom, turns the Princess's brothers into swans. Moon Fairies vow to turn her brothers back to humans if she knits them seven robes and not speak to another human for a specified amount of time.

== Cast ==
- Marguerite Clark - Princess Tweedledee
- William E. Danforth - The King
- Augusta Anderson - The Wicked Queen
- Edwin Denison - The Lord High Chancellor
- Daisy Belmore - The Witch
- Richard Barthelmess - Prince Charming
- Richard Allen - Princess Tweedeldee's Brother
- Jere Austin - Tweedeldee's Brother
- Joseph Sterling - Tweedeldee's Brother
- Frederick Merrick - Tweedeldee's Brother
- Lee F. Daly - Tweedeldee's Brother
- Stanley King - Tweedeldee's Brother
- Gordon Dana - Tweedeldee's Brother
