= The Blasphemer =

1921 film

- Directed by: O. E. Goebel
- Produced by: Catholic Art Association
- Starring: George Howard, Augusta Anderson, Irving Cummings
- Release date: 1921
- Country: United States
- Language: Silent film (English intertitles)

The Blasphemer is a 1921 American silent drama film directed by O. E. Goebel and starring George Howard and Augusta Anderson. It was produced by the Catholic Art Association.

== Plot ==
The story revolves around John Harden, a Wall Street banker whose absence in faith leads to a life of despair and poverty. Having risen to a position of power on Wall Street, he boasts about his successes, claiming that he is the master of his fate, not God nor the devil. Soon afterwards, though, his family goes into poverty and his friends leave him. His faith is restored when he rescues his daughter who was being kept hostage in a Chinese opium den.

== Cast ==
- George Howard - John Harden
- Augusta Anderson - Mrs. Anderson
- Irving Cummings - Chinese Opium Den Operator
