= The Valentine Girl =

1917 film directed by J. Searle Dawley

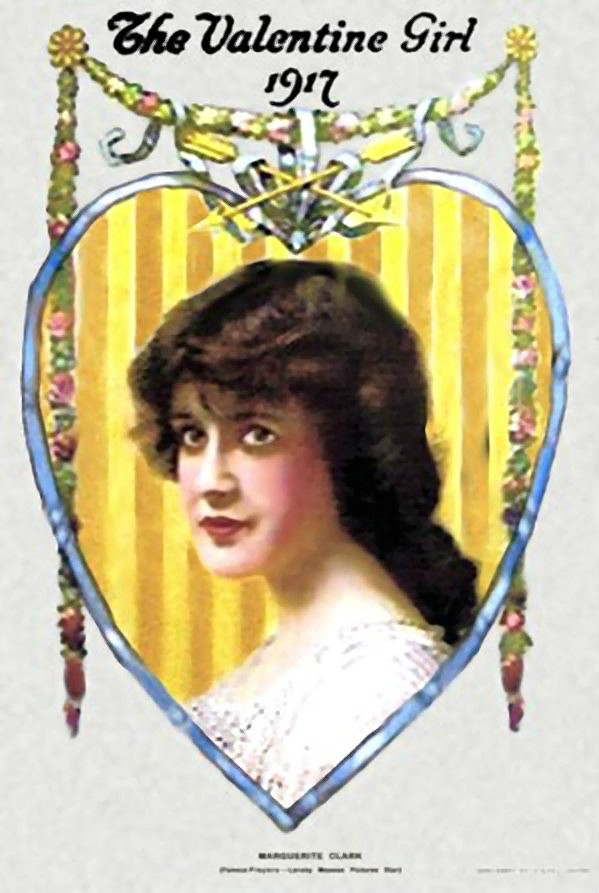
- Film poster
- Directed by: J. Searle Dawley
- Written by: Laura Sawyer (story)
- Starring: Marguerite Clark; Frank Losee; Richard Barthelmess
- Cinematography: H. Lyman Broening
- Production company: Famous Players Film Company
- Distributed by: Paramount Pictures
- Release date: April 22, 1917
- Running time: 50 minutes
- Country: United States
- Language: Silent (English intertitles)

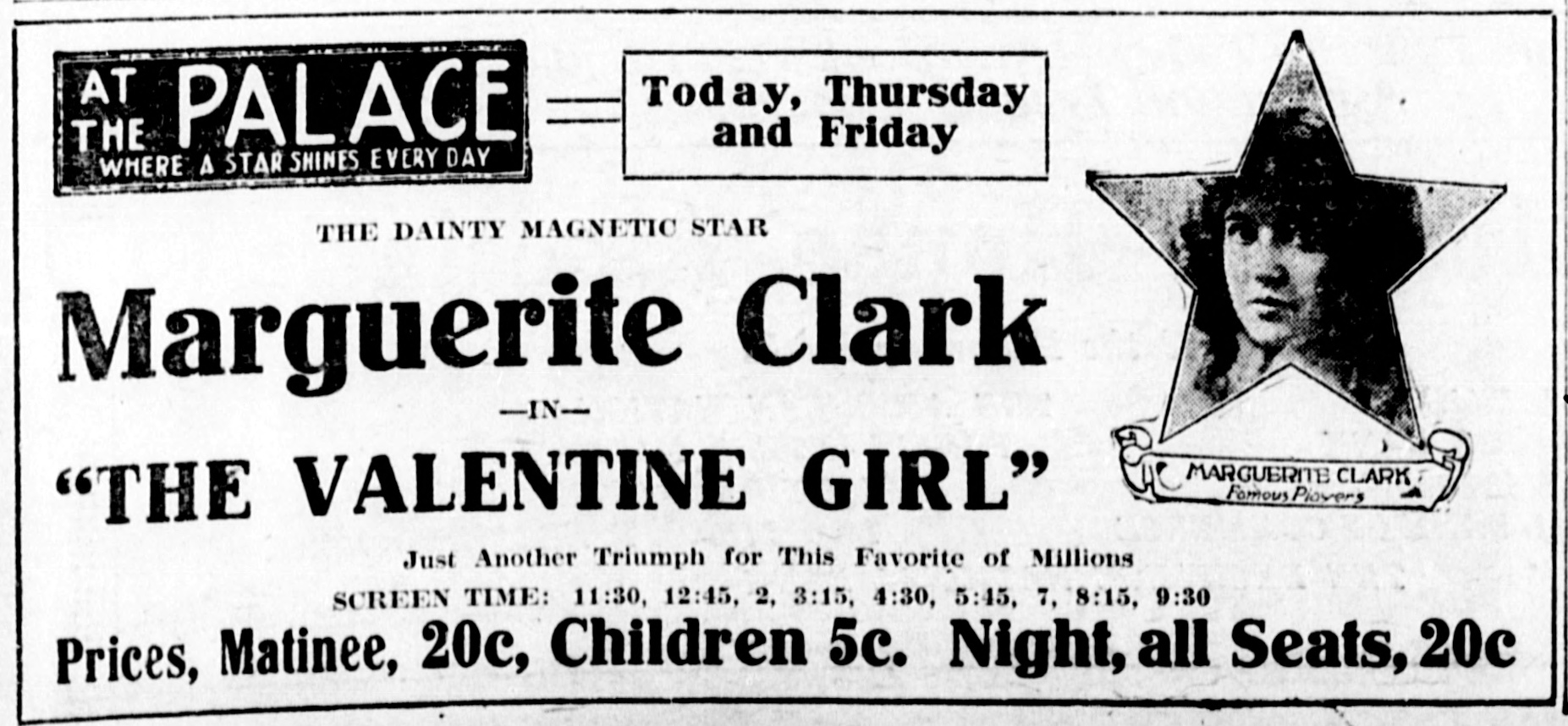
Newspaper advertisement.

The Valentine Girl is a lost 1917 American silent romantic drama film directed by J. Searle Dawley and distributed by Paramount Pictures. The film starred Marguerite Clark, Frank Losee, and Richard Barthelmess. Actress Laura Sawyer wrote the screen story.

== Cast ==
- Marguerite Clark as Marion Morgan
- Frank Losee as John Morgan
- Richard Barthelmess as Robert Wentworth
- Kathryn Adams as Lucille Haines
- Maggie Fisher as Mrs. Haines
- Adolphe Menjou as Joe Winder
- Edith Campbell Walker as Madame Blache

== Preservation ==
With no holdings located in archives, The Valentine Girl is considered a lost film.
