= Wildflower (1914 film) =

1914 film by Allan Dwan

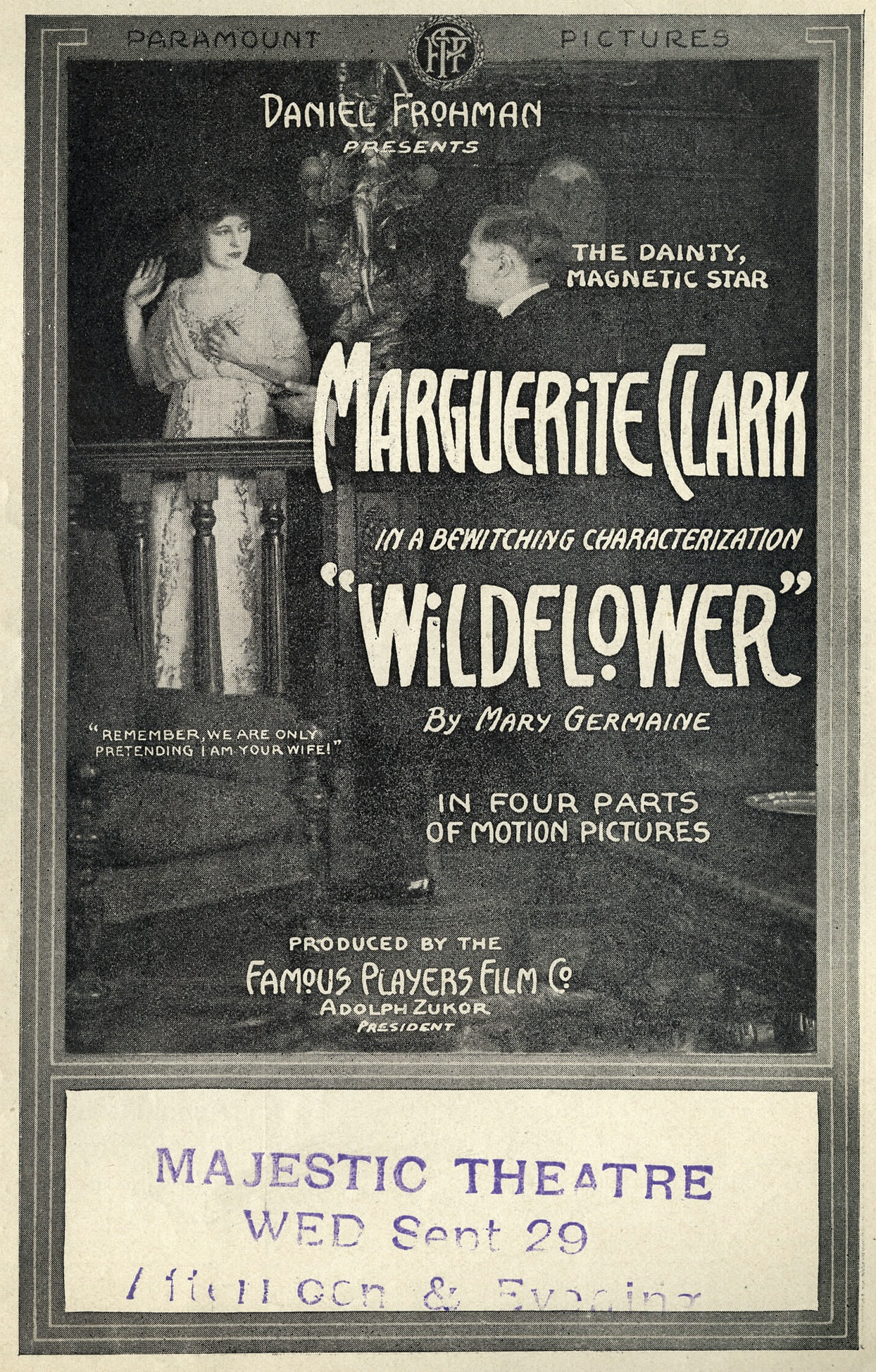
- 1914 lobby poster
- Directed by: Allan Dwan
- Written by: Allan Dwan (scenario); Eve Unsell (scenario)
- Story by: Mary Germaine
- Produced by: Adolph Zukor; Daniel Frohman
- Starring: Marguerite Clark; Harold Lockwood; Jack Pickford
- Cinematography: Henry Lyman Broening
- Production company: Famous Players–Lasky Corporation
- Distributed by: Paramount Pictures
- Release date: October 15, 1914
- Running time: 4 reels; 4,163 feet
- Country: United States
- Languages: Silent; English intertitles

Wildflower was a 1914 American silent romantic drama film produced by Adolph Zukor and directed by Allan Dwan. It stars stage actress Marguerite Clark in her first motion picture. Clark would be one of the few stage stars to go on to superstardom in silent pictures. The film is now presumed lost.

== Cast ==
- Marguerite Clark - Letty Roberts
- Harold Lockwood - Arnold Boyd
- James Cooley - Gerald Boyd
- Edgar L. Davenport - The Lawyer
- Jack Pickford - Bud Haskins
