= Winthrop Ames =

American playwright (1870–1937)

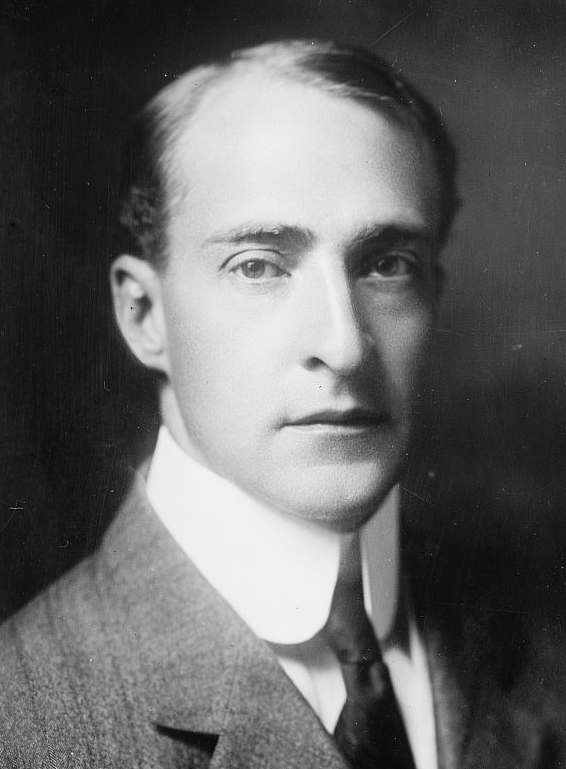
Winthrop Ames

Winthrop Ames (November 25, 1870 – November 3, 1937) was an American theatre director and producer, playwright and screenwriter.

For three decades at the beginning of the 20th century, Ames was an important force on Broadway, whose repertoire included directing and producing Shakespeare and classic plays, new plays, and revivals of Gilbert and Sullivan's Savoy operas.

== Biography ==
Ames was born in North Easton, Massachusetts, to Cathrine Hobart and Oakes Angier Ames, members of a wealthy manufacturing family. Ames studied art and architecture at Harvard University. He worked in the publishing business before turning to a career in the theatre. In 1911, Ames married Lucy (Fuller) Cabot in London, and the couple had two daughters named Catherine and Joan.

=== Early career ===
In 1904, Ames toured Europe to study the management techniques of sixty opera and theatre companies. Upon his return to America, he became manager of Boston's Castle Square Theatre. In 1908, he was appointed as the managing director of the New Theatre, at Central Park West and 62nd Street in New York. In November 1909, the theatre opened officially to the public with an opulent production of Antony and Cleopatra starring Julia Marlowe and E. H. Sothern. The New Theatre was the largest playhouse in New York City at that time, and Ames began to mount ambitious productions, ranging from Shakespeare and other classics to modern works. The theatre was a financial failure and closed after only two seasons.

In 1912, bucking the tide of Broadway commercialism, Ames used his own money to build the Little Theatre at 240 West 44th Street with the express idea of putting on experimental dramas and to give an opportunity to new playwrights. This theatre had 300 seats and was, at the time, the smallest legitimate theatre in New York. One of the plays he presented in October of the first year of operation was Snow White and the Seven Dwarfs, which he billed as the "First play written entirely for the enjoyment of children." Ames wrote the play under the pseudonym "Jessie Graham White" from the stories of the Brothers Grimm. The play received favorable reviews. He also built the Booth Theatre on West 45th Street in 1913 and managed both the Little Theatre and the Booth until 1930.

Ames's most notable Broadway productions included an adaptation of Prunella (1913), The Philanderer (1913), A Pair of Silk Stockings (1914), and Pierrot the Prodigal (1916). During World War I, Ames organized the Over There Theatre League, which arranged for actors to travel to Europe to entertain troops.

=== Later years ===
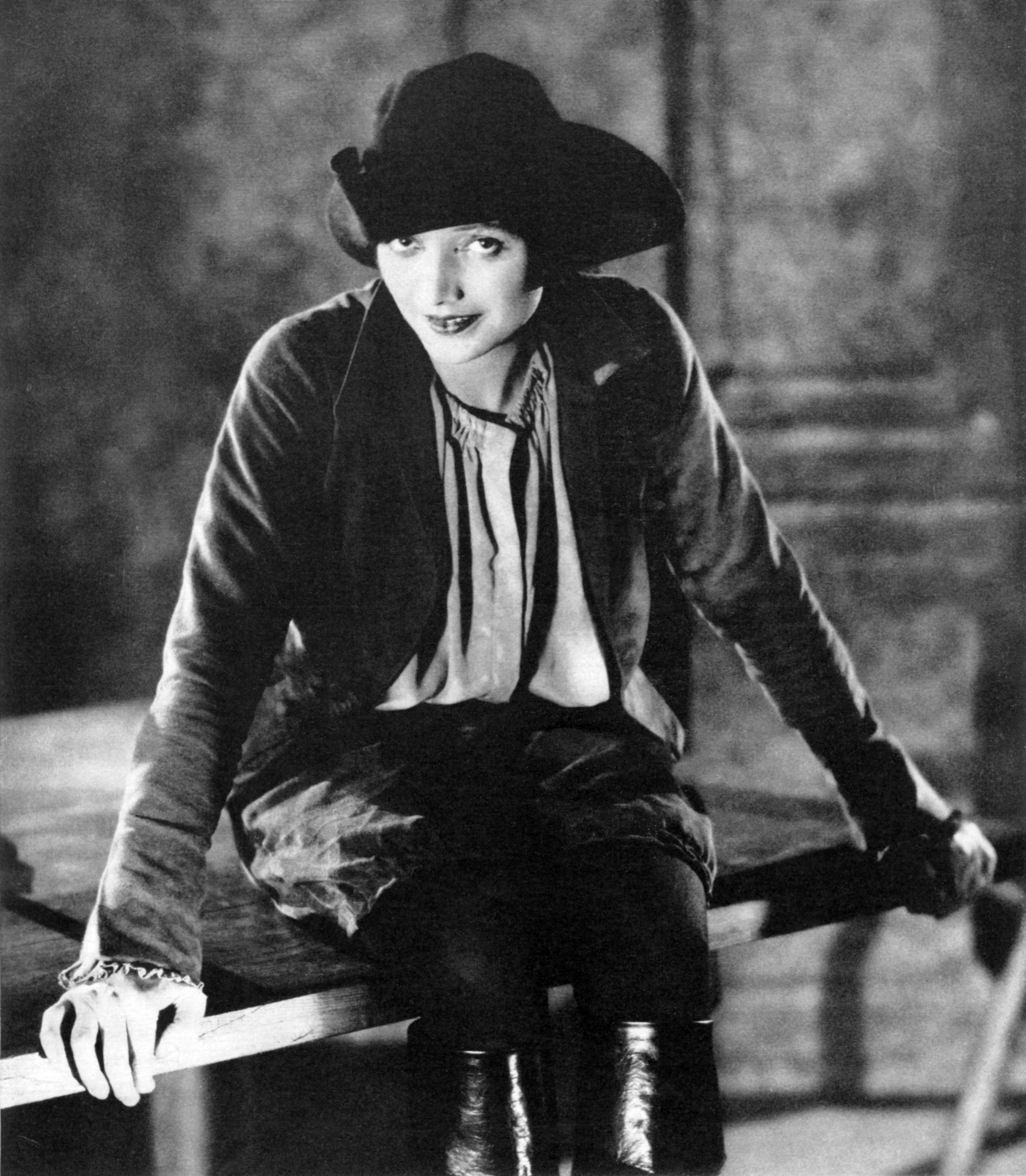
Katharine Cornell in Ames' production of Will Shakespeare (1923)

After the war, Ames began to direct most of the Broadway shows that he produced, including The Betrothal (1918), The Green Goddess (1921), The Truth About Blayds (1922), Will Shakespeare (1923), Beggar on Horseback (1924), Minick (1924), Old English (1924), White Wings (1926), Escape (1927), The Merchant of Venice (1928) and Mrs. Moonlight (1930).

By the 1920s, after the extraordinary success of the Gilbert and Sullivan works in America at the end of the nineteenth century, the popularity of Gilbert and Sullivan in the U.S. had waned. Ames revived interest in these comic operas with lavish and lively seasons of Iolanthe, The Pirates of Penzance and The Mikado from 1926 to 1929. Ames directed the productions himself at the Booth Theatre, which received critical praise. He also toured the Gilbert and Sullivan operas in the United States. His productions paved the way for American tours by the D'Oyly Carte Opera Company in the 1930s. Time magazine wrote of Ames' production of Iolanthe: "It is generally agreed that in this entertainment he has done the best job of any producer attempting one of the famous series in our time. The only anxiety now is that he may be distracted before he has revived everyone of the operas in an equally felicitous vein. ... The show is now accepted as incomparably the finest musical preparation of its type in town, and probably in the world.

In the 1920s, Ames began leasing his theatres to other producers, and he produced his last Broadway play in 1930. In 1931, as he wound down his business affairs with age and poor health, he sold the Little Theatre building to The New York Times. In 1959, the theatre was converted back to a theatre and was briefly renamed in 1964 as the "Winthrop Ames Theatre", and in 1983 it was renamed the Helen Hayes Theatre. In 1932, Ames left New York to retire to North Easton, but there he helped to found the Cambridge School of Drama. In 1929, he was elected a trustee of Harvard and in 1936 became vice president of the National Institute of Arts and Letters.

In addition to writing his children's adaptation of Snow White in 1913, Ames was commissioned by the Famous Players–Lasky Corporation to write the screenplay for their 1916 motion pictures Oliver Twist and Snow White. He also translated The Merchant of Paris from the French in 1930 and wrote other plays.

Ames died of pneumonia in 1937 in Boston at age 66 and was buried in North Easton. Like other influential Broadway theater producers, Ames's likeness was captured in caricature by Alex Gard for the wall of Sardi's, the New York City Theater District restaurant. The picture is now part of the collection of the New York Public Library.

Ames was inducted, posthumously, into the American Theatre Hall of Fame in 1981.
