= Hugh Ford (director) =

American actor, director (1868–1942)

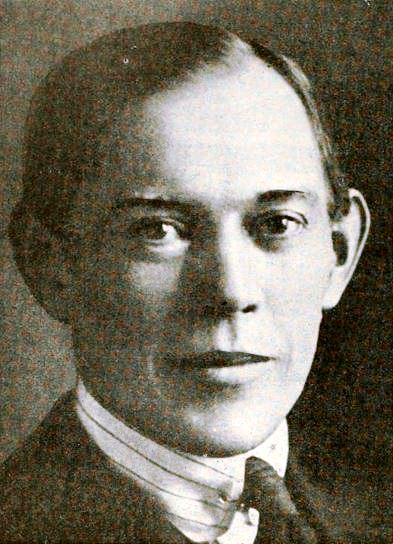
- Ford in 1919
- Born: February 5, 1868; Washington, D.C., USA
- Died: December 29, 1942 (aged 74); New York City, New York, USA
- Education: American Academy of Dramatic Arts
- Alma mater: Van der Naillen School of Mines and Engineering
- Occupations: Actor, director, producer
- Years active: 1889-1932
- Notable work: The Garden of Allah, Merton of the Movies
- Spouse: Jessie Weir Izett (m. 1899–1942)
- Children: 1

Hugh Ford (February 5, 1868 – December 29, 1942) was an American stage actor, director, and producer. He performed on stage as an actor from 1889 through 1904. From 1898 on he also directed plays: for stock companies, the F. F. Proctor organization, Liebler & Company, and later as an independent through 1932. His Broadway credits span over forty years as performer and creative crew; he also adapted and wrote several plays, and an article on modern stagecraft as employed in early films. He worked in the silent film industry for eight years, directing 31 films and writing for 19 between 1913 and 1921. This film experience later proved useful when he directed and co-produced the Kaufman and Connelly Broadway hit, Merton of the Movies, which ran an entire season for nearly 400 performances. Ford retired in 1932, devoting himself to landscape art until his death ten years later.

== Early years ==
Hugh Ford (Note: Ford's middle initial is given as "G" on a death index, and in a brief obituary notice in The New York Times, but otherwise there is no record of him using it. From 1899 through 1905 he occasionally was cited as Hugh J. Ford, for a report of his wedding and marriage, and two stage credits.) was born February 5, 1868, in Washington, D.C., to German immigrants George Ford and Henrietta Price Ford. The family moved to California after Ford's birth. He attended the Van der Naillen School of Mines and Engineering in San Francisco.

== Stock company actor ==
According to a newspaper account, Ford said his first performance was as a member of the original cast for The Charity Ball, produced by Daniel Frohman at the Lyceum Theatre. This three-act play by Henry Churchill de Mille and David Belasco premiered in November 1889. Ford's name does not appear in any cast list for the production. Assuming he did take part, it was while he was a drama school apprentice at the American Academy of Dramatic Arts in that same theatre.

His next known credit dates from October 1890, when he and Maude Adams were listed among players (Note: Others in the troupe were William Morris, Etta Hawkins, Emmett Corrigan, and Odette Tyler.) in the newly formed stock company of Charles Frohman slated to perform in the premiere of Men and Women on Broadway. (Note: Ford's role, Mr. Wayne, was not mentioned by any reviewer on opening night, and IBDb assigns it to E. Mackey, which the Wikipedia article on the play has as Edgar Mackey.) Ford was still with the Charles Frohman stock company in April 1891, playing Men and Women on tour in Chicago, and the following month in Salt Lake City. The tour visited Los Angeles in June, and finished up in Washington state during July 1891.

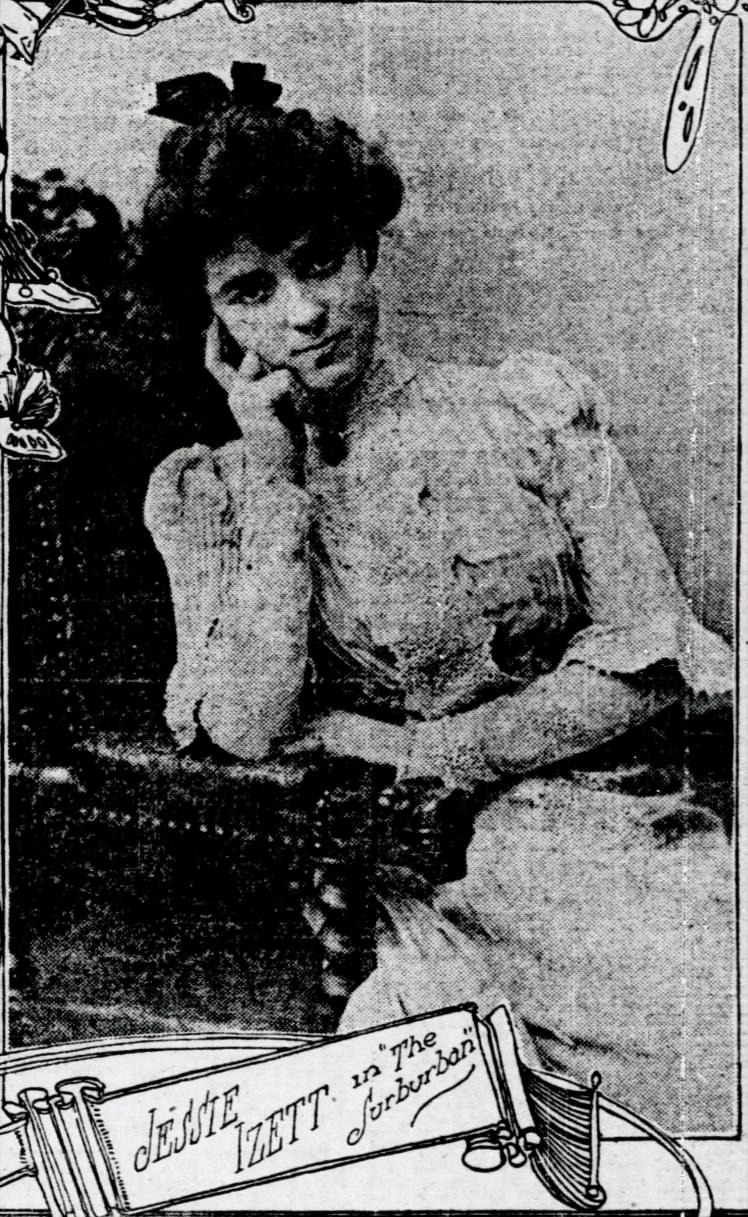

Ford then joined the company of Gracie Emmett, touring in an old melodrama she bought and had rewritten, The Pulse of New York, starting in April 1892, and continuing through May 1893. In late October 1893, he was engaged for a tour in Canada with H. B. Clarke. For a month the company played Halifax, Nova Scotia and Saint John, New Brunswick, only to be abandoned at the latter by Clarke, without their final week's pay or return fare to New York.

By August 1895 Ford was in San Francisco with the Henry E. Dixey company, which included Maurice Barrymore and Rose Coghlan. He performed minor roles in Masks and Faces and As You Like It, before going on tour with Dixey in The Lottery of Love through March 1896. Ford returned to San Francisco for a summer season with the L. R. Stockwell company at the California Theatre.

Ford was hired in September 1896 for character parts with the Grand Opera House stock company in Salt Lake City. This was a new company, and among its other members was actress Jessie Izett from Denver. During March 1897 Ford won a bet with the company's juvenile, (Note: A juvenile in theatre was a stock character, and not indicative of the actor's age. Unlike an ingénue, the juvenile could be either male or female, though the former predominated.) Thomas W. Ross, over the Corbett–Fitzsimmons fight. He then accepted an invitation to hold their own four-round bout, for a $50 wager. The Salt Lake Herald reported that Ford had eight pounds and a bit of a reach on Ross, and was known for his skill at boxing. There was no acrimony between them, and they, along with other stock company actors, played baseball against officers of the 24th Infantry at Fort Douglas in April 1897. Ford wrote a play titled Social Bubbles, which was accepted for production by Herbert Kelcey that same month. (Note: Ford had hoped to get a tryout at the Grand Opera House before the stock company ended its season, but the play had only one part for a leading man. The stock company had two leading men, Walter Edwards and Howard Kyle, neither of whom was willing to perform in a lesser role.) After the stock company's season ended, Ford joined leading man Walter Edwards for the summer season at Elitch Theatre in Denver. Jessie Izett, whose hometown it was, also went to Denver.

== Marriage and early stage management ==
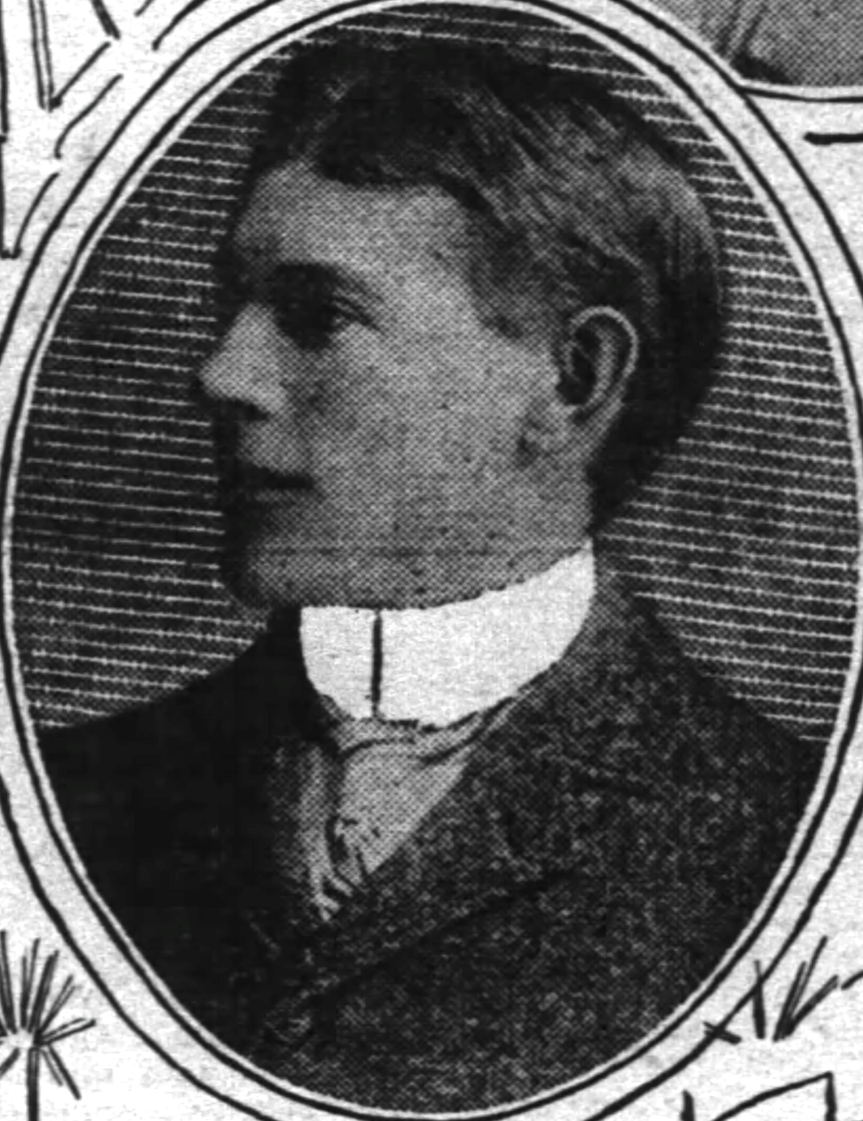
Hugh Ford 1901

Ford next went to Pittsburgh's Grand Theatre stock company, in which he would perform "old men's characters". Walter Edwards, playing "heavies", and Jessie Izett, "female juveniles", also joined this company in August 1897. Ford directed a production of amateurs in Our Boys for a charity benefit in February 1898. He was later reported as being assistant stage manager during his season with the Grand Theatre. While Jessie Izett remained with the Grand Theatre stock company, Ford joined the Imperial Theater's new stock company in St. Louis, Missouri during September 1898. After playing in Romeo and Juliet in St. Louis, he took a week off in late March 1899 to marry Jessie Izett in Pittsburgh. They continued their separate bookings until June 1899, when Jessie joined Ford in the newly-formed Lawrence Hanley stock company, performing outdoor theatre in Olympia Park. (Note: Originally called Klondyke Park, it had just been renamed. It comprised the area near Grand Blvd and Arsenal Street that is now part of Tower Grove Park in St. Louis.)

Ford and his wife moved to New York City, where he signed with the William Morris company. He was on tour with them in The Adventure of Lady Ursula when their only child was born in late December 1899. By October 1900 Ford and Jessie Izett had joined the Grand Opera House stock company in Indianapolis, Indiana. Ford drew good reviews for his portrayal of Svengali in Trilby, but the venue soon shut down and the Fords were forced to accept separate engagements. Jessie Izett went on tour with Howard Kyle's company in Nathan Hale, while Hugh Ford joined the Dearborn stock company in Chicago, playing eccentrics and character parts.

Their professional paths crossed again in Memphis, Tennessee when both were hired for the Hopkins stock company of the Grand Opera House. Jessie Izett, who had done well on the Nathan Hale tour, was hired as the leading lady, while Ford was appointed stage director, and expected to play character parts as well. His first directorial effort, for The Little Minister, was well received, while a later report praised not only his direction but his providing set designs for the scene painter to color. Both Ford and Jessie Izett were popular with Memphis audiences; their benefit (Note: A benefit was a 19th Century tradition of stock companies, whereby a performer was rewarded for long service or popularity by having a day dedicated to them. The benefit was usually proposed and underwritten by patrons who guaranteed the box office receipts, a portion of which went to the honoree, in case of a low turnout. The play to be performed and their own part in it was agreed upon between the honoree and theater management.) performance on February 14, 1902 in Caprice were SRO at the matinee and evening show.

== Proctor's organization ==
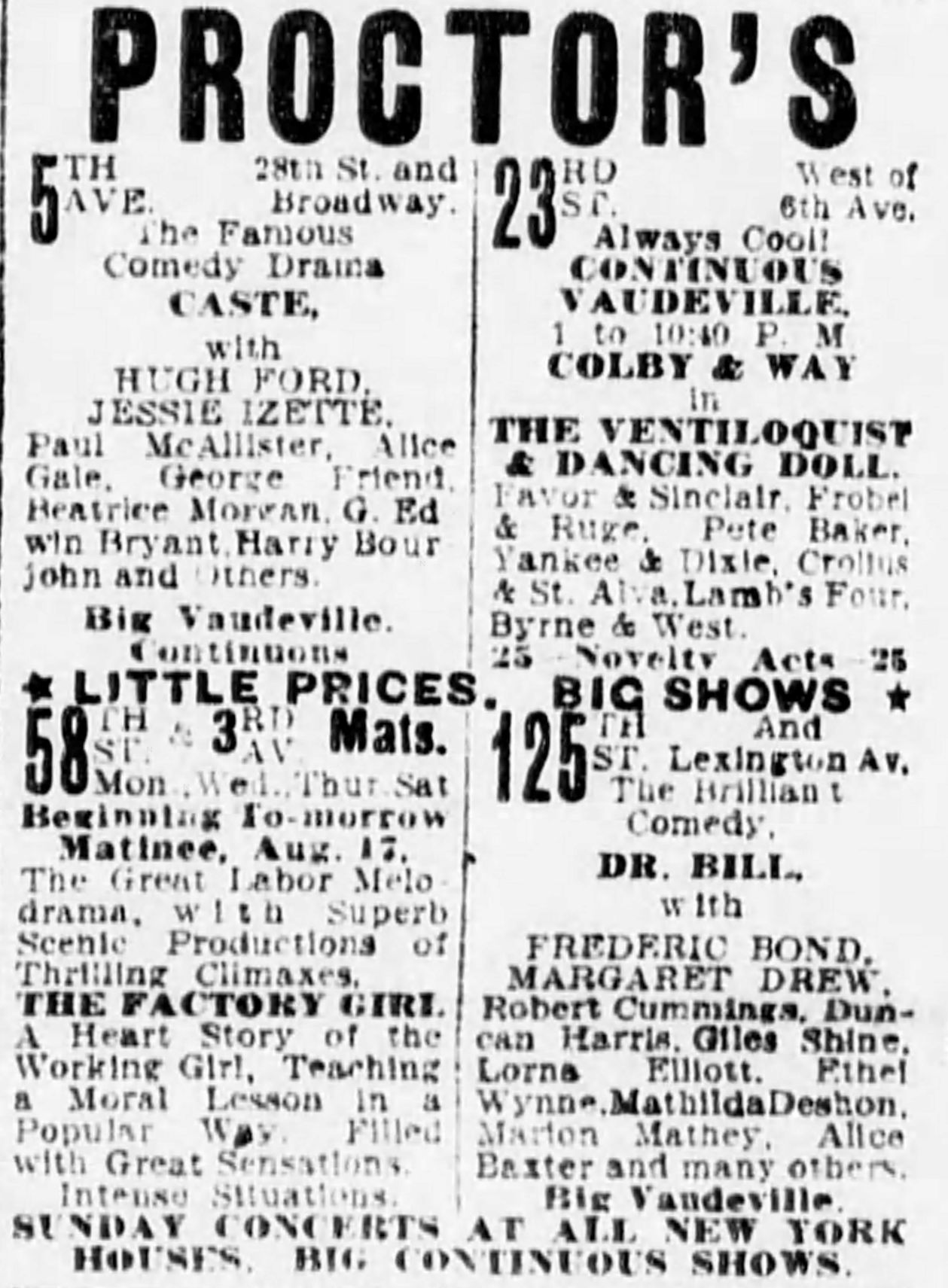

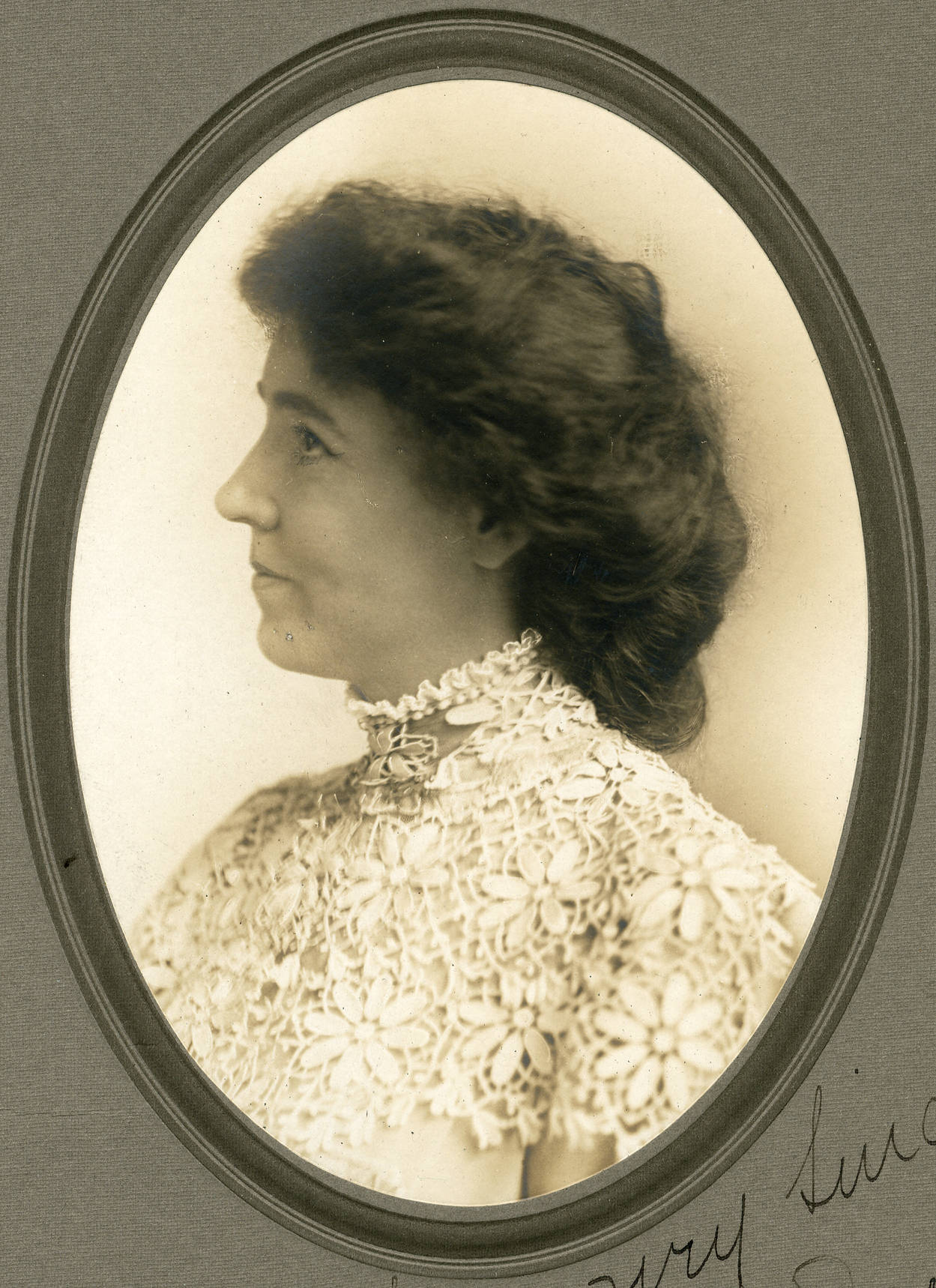
Jessie Izett 1907

After Memphis, Ford and his wife again went in different directions for employment. Jessie Izett toured with William S. Hart and J. H. Gilmour in The Suburban, while Ford joined F. F. Proctor's organization, a group of stock companies based at the four Manhattan theatres Proctor owned. In those pre-Equity days, Proctor moved performers and plays between theatres at will. Ford was with Proctor's 125th Street Theatre in Harlem during February 1903, and in April with the company at Proctor's Fifth Avenue Theatre. By that time Jessie Izett and The Suburban company were playing at the Academy of Music in Manhattan. Ford was stage director for Proctor's Fifth Avenue Theatre by July 1903. A month later Jessie Izett joined Ford at Proctor's to star in a revival of Caste. This was a one-week run for Jessie Izett, who was committed to touring. Ford stayed with Proctor's, both performing and directing. At a revival of Trilby in December 1903, Ford directed and played Svengali opposite Lotta Linthicum in the title role. (Note: During one evening show, Ford had just collapsed backwards onto a table for Svengali's death scene and lay motionless, waiting for Trilby to discover his corpse and end the third act. But Lotta Linthicum didn't appear, so Ford stayed motionless in a supine position across the table, in front of the audience. After five minutes someone found the actress collapsed against a backstage piano, and thought to bring the curtain down, releasing Ford. With the aid of a doctor, Lotta Linthicum was brought around and played the fourth act.)

Ford recounted tales of stage effects gone wrong to Adolph Klauber in January 1904, mentioning the 125th Street Theatre in particular: "The Harlem house was always a Jonah to me... whenever there was a smash in an intricate scene, it was always in Harlem that it happened." Jessie Izett replaced female lead Agnes Ardeck as Molly Wood in the original Broadway production of The Virginian the following month, but was able to join Ford in a one time performance of Her First Offense by Julius Chambers in March 1904. They teamed up again in April for a revival of Audrey by Harriet Ford, for which they had permission from Liebler & Company, and used the original scenery and costumes for that Eleanor Robson vehicle. By June 1904 Ford was referred to as the general stage director for Proctor's organization.

== Liebler & Company ==
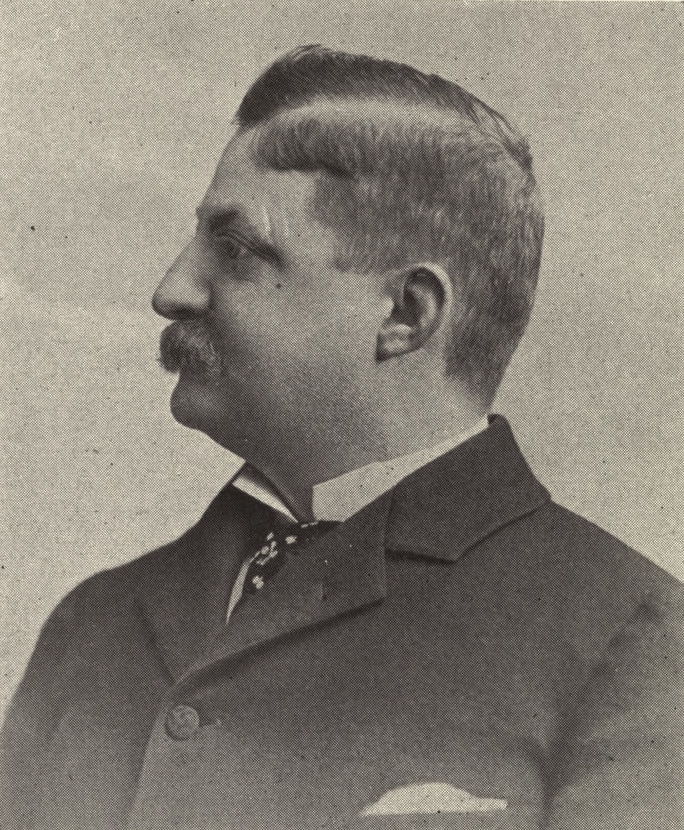
T. A. Liebler 1909

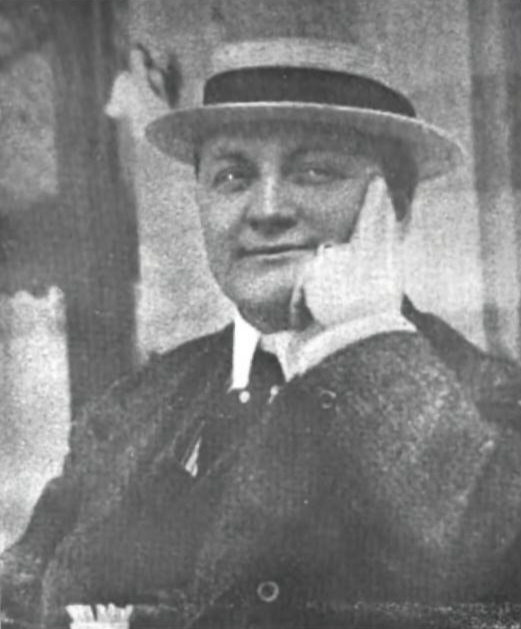
George C. Tyler 1907

Ford was hired by Liebler & Company in August 1905, to direct their new production of The Prodigal Son by Hall Caine on its opening tour. Liebler & Company was a partnership between producer George C. Tyler and investor Theodore A. Liebler (1852-1941) They had founded Liebler & Company in 1898, and since then had become a major producer of plays. By the time Ford staged Sydney Rosenfeld's musical The Vanderbilt Cup (Note: Named after the annual Vanderbilt Cup auto race that had begun in 1904.) in January 1906, he was general stage director for Liebler & Company.

As general stage director, he supervised other directors who had responsibility for revivals and touring companies, while he himself staged new works, such as Salomy Jane (1907), The Man from Home (1907), The Melting Pot (1908), The Dawn of a Tomorrow (1909), Alias Jimmy Valentine (1909), and The Deep Purple (1910). He also worked with English writer Louis N. Parker to stage the latter's work, when Pomander Walk (1910) and Disraeli (1911) had their premieres. Ford travelled with Tyler and Edward A. Morange to Biskra, Algeria during April 1911, where they met up with English author-playwright Robert Hichens, for inspiration on set designs, and to recruit local people for The Garden of Allah.

The Garden of Allah was a highly successful spectacle; over 375,000 people saw it during the Broadway run (Oct 1911-May 1912) at the massive Century Theatre, more than any single play to that date. To follow it, Liebler & Company chose a French drama by Pierre Loti and Judith Gautier, called The Daughter of Heaven (La fille du ciel). This was a tragedy set in Ming dynasty China. Hugh Ford and Edward A. Morange travelled to Paris for consultations with the playwrights, while a young writer, Heywood Broun, was sent to China to collect photos and drawings for the settings and costumes. The translation from French was done by Mrs. Golding Bright under her pen name of George Egerton. Tang Young Lee, nephew of Tang Shaoyi, was engaged as technical advisor on Chinese culture. Ford spent nine months preparing and staging the play, which ran for nearly 100 performances, but still lost money. His final work for Liebler & Company was to produce and direct plays for the Children's Theatre that was installed on the roof of the Century Theatre in the Fall of 1912.

== Film industry ==
After leaving Liebler & Company, Ford staged the long-running success Potash and Perlmutter during the summer of 1913, but received little credit for it. According to George S. Kaufman in 1916, the success of the play was due to Ford's staging. Kaufman, then a drama critic for the New-York Tribune said of Ford: "He did more than stage it; he built it. So valuable were his services, in fact, that he is said to have been paid a royalty upon the play. Yet few persons heard of Mr. Ford in connection with the production of Potash and Perlmutter."

Ford joined the Famous Players Film Company, along with another Liebler stage director, Frederick Stanhope, and set designer Edward Morange, during December 1913. Ford was the first major stage director to try making films. He directed 31 films between 1913 and 1921. He was inactive in the theater during these years. Ford also wrote for 19 films between 1913 and 1920. He started his film career as co-director of The Prisoner of Zenda in 1913.

== Kaufman and Connelly ==
Ford joined with his old Liebler & Company boss George C. Tyler to produce two plays by George S. Kaufman and Marc Connelly. Tyler had given the duo their first playwriting assignment with Dulcy in 1921, followed by To the Ladies, and the musical revue The Forty-Niners.

Kaufman and Connelly's most successful play for Tyler, Merton of the Movies, was co-produced by Ford, who also staged it. An adaptation of the Harry Leon Wilson novel, the comedy starred Florence Nash and Glenn Hunter in a Hollywood satire. The production lasted eleven months on Broadway, running to nearly 400 performances.

Kaufman and Connelly's last collaboration with George C. Tyler was The Deep Tangled Wildwood, a light satire on rural comedies, which Ford again staged and co-produced. Critic Arthur Pollock said the jokes were good but there was little else to the play; it was withdrawn after two weeks on Broadway.

== Later years ==
During Spring 1924, Ford and George C. Tyler produced a series of Broadway matinee performances by Madame Simon. They recruited José Ruben and Eva Le Gallienne to support her in La vierge folle by Henry Bataille, followed by La couturière de Lunéville by Alfred Savoir, and Le passé by Georges de Porto-Riche. They also continued to manage Glenn Hunter and the Merton of the Movies touring company, and produced Mrs. Fiske in a long-running revival tour for The Rivals. Ford also directed, and co-produced with Tyler, the Owen Davis comedy Ma Pettengill, which toured the Midwest starting in March 1925.

Ford had retired from film-making in 1921, but told Burns Mantle he had made enough money in that industry to last his lifetime. His stage activities tapered off from 1925, but he indulged in some playwriting in 1927 with It Makes a Difference, which vanished after a brief run in Chicago. However, the Wall Street crash of 1929 persuaded him to accept a staging job for Diana in December 1929. Originally titled Isadora in tryouts, it depicted the famous dancer Isadora Duncan, who had died two years earlier. Ford had unwisely invested some money in Diana, for this work by Irving Kaye Davis failed after one week, leading the playwright to make accusations of moral prejudice against critics.

Ford's last stage involvement was in the Fall of 1932, when he and co-producer Harry Askin took on the managerial lease for the Hudson Theatre, which had fallen into bankruptcy with the Great Depression. Their idea was to present original plays for low prices, letting each one run for so long as it made money. Their first offering was a three-act play by actor Robert Middlemass, The Budget, which Ford staged. It failed after a week, and Ford retired permanently. Ten years later he died, on December 29, 1942.

== Personal character ==
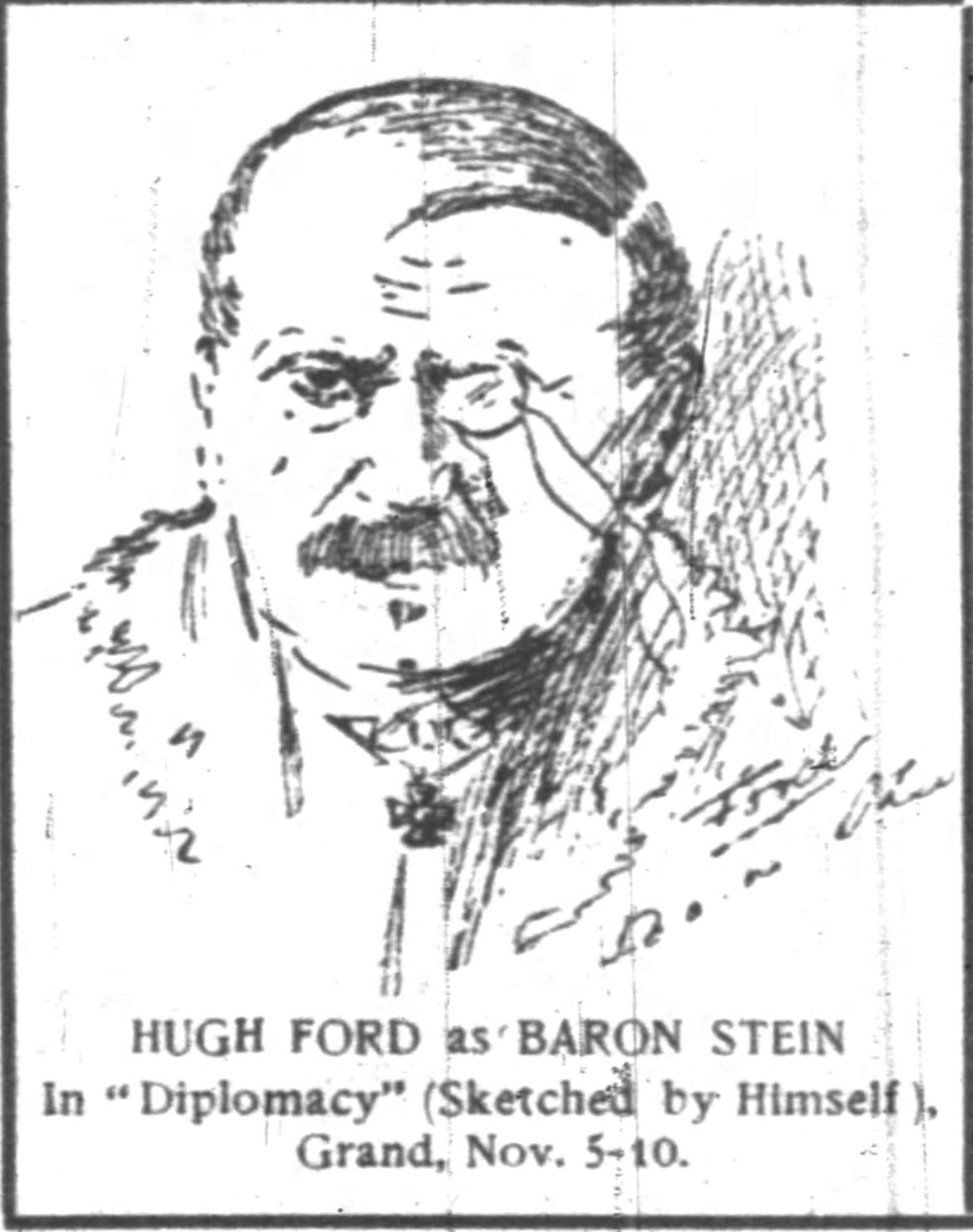

Outgoing and athletic in the 1890s, Ford became wary of personal publicity as he moved into stage directing. He was often interviewed by newspaper and magazine journalists on various aspects of the theater, but never discussed himself. A private person, his wedding had only two guests: the married couple with whom his bride then boarded, who also served as witnesses. Originally trained for an engineering career, he was a fair draftsman. He also had some sketching ability; when a reporter wanted a photo of Ford in character, he obliged with a drawing instead. Ford said his approach to theatre staging was to give impressions and avoid ultra-realism, as he felt it only distracted the spectator.

“Do you know Mr. Hugh Ford? Yes? Then you know a courteous and amiable volcano. Or, shall I say, a polite streak of lightning? In a flash he sees faults and in another flash he corrects them. He is alert, watchful, eager. You would think that the play he happens to be at work on is the only play he has any interest in, that it is the one object of his existence. Presently you learn he is rehearsing sixteen others in the same week, and is traveling sixteen thousand miles to do so. And with all his speed and energy he is patient, considerate, and encouraging, so that he gets the best possible results, with the slightest amount of friction.” — Louis N. Parker in The Green Book Magazine

Columnist Frederick Donaghy said Hugh Ford "... has been the uncredited collaborator of many playwrights in his career as a stage director. The late Paul Armstrong, when a play of his was put on by Mr. Ford without changes to the manuscript, is said to have screamed in triumph: My God! My play is Fordproof! The English playwright Louis N. Parker, whose Pomander Walk was produced by Liebler & Company in 1911, was more appreciative of Ford's revisions to that work after the first tryout.

Producer George C. Tyler said Ford had an enthusiasm for what he called "dramaturgy". Tyler recounted how this quality once got Ford into a ticklish situation with William Sydney Porter, better known as O. Henry. Tyler had advanced Porter $2000 to dramatize his own short story, The World and the Door, but had received nothing except a brief scenario. Tyler sent Ford to the apartment Porter had taken in Manhattan, where he found the author "boiled as an owl" but able to sit upright at a table. Ford began discussing the structure of the play and let his "professional enthusiasm run away with him". He advanced notions about how the play might be developed to an impassive Porter, who suddenly opened a drawer in the table and took out a pistol. Waving it about, Porter said "Do you see this? Well, I keep this here just for fellows like you." According to Tyler, Ford grabbed his hat and ran, and Porter never did write the play.

While working in Hollywood, he was said to be the only one who followed "the quaint New York custom of wearing a bowler hat". Burns Mantle, who had been a Ford collaborator (Note: Mantle had written the scenario for the film Lady Rose's Daughter, which Ford directed in 1920.) as well as a critic of his work, said: "It was like Hugh Ford, who died last week, to request that nothing more than necessary be mentioned of his passing". Mantle reported that since Ford's retirement he had developed "marked skill as a landscape artist".

== Jean Ford ==
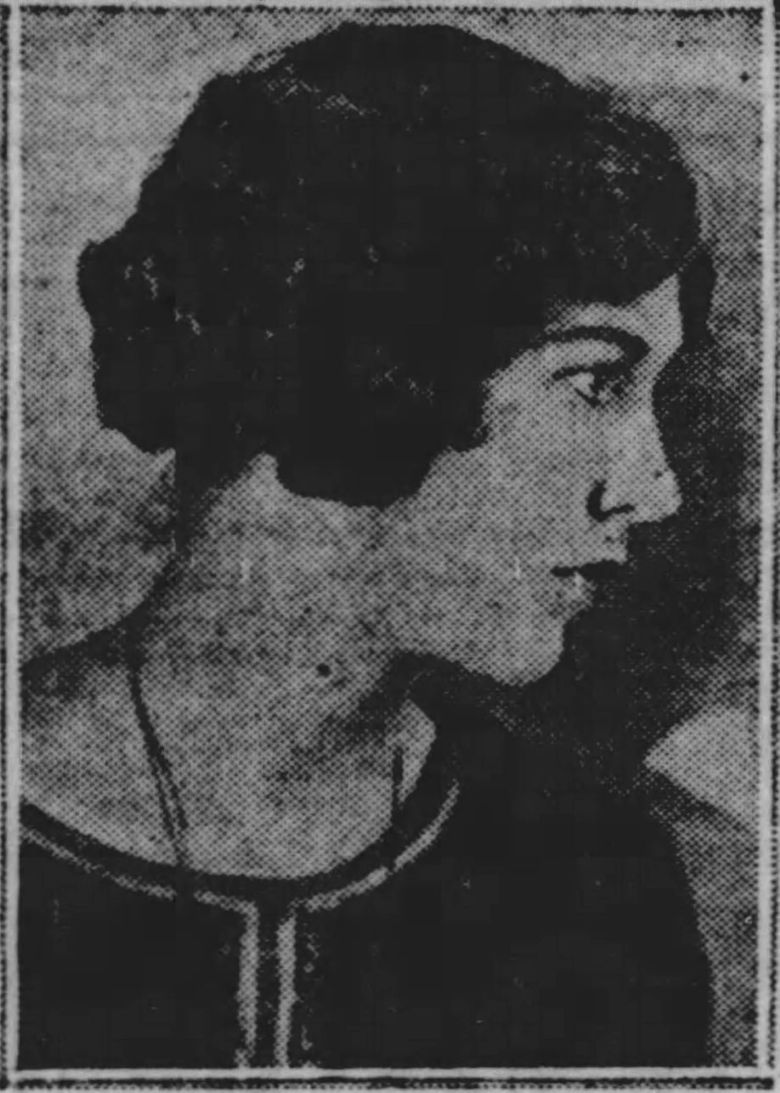
Jean Ford

Ford and his wife Jessie Izett had a daughter in December 1899, whom they named Izetta Henrietta, but who from an early age went by Jean. At six months, she appeared with her mother in a stock production, and at one year old with her parents at Indianapolis in Confusion. She was introduced to both stage management and acting as a child. She was assistant stage manager on Tip Top in 1921, when she composed music for Fred Stone's song I'm a Bad, Bad Man. Jean Ford was a principal performer in George White's Scandals of 1921 during the summer of that year. She graduated from Vassar College in June 1922, When her father co-produced The Romantic Age by A. A. Milne, starring Leslie Howard and Margalo Gillmore, in November 1922, Jean Ford had a featured role. She then spent a season with a Rochester, New York stock company, Most of her subsequent professional work was for projects in which her father had a hand. She spent time touring in his production of Merton of the Movies, had a prominent part in Ma Pettengill during its Midwest tour, spent a season with Mrs. Fiske in The Rivals, and performed in It Makes a Difference, before leaving acting to get married in 1928.

== Writings ==
=== Non-fiction ===
- Throwing a New Light on the Drama (1913) Two-page article on the importance of lighting for stage productions, with illustrations by Ike Morgan, published in Sunday supplements for newspapers.

=== Plays ===
This includes only works where Ford was the sole or principal author, and excludes "play doctoring" for other writers.

- Social Bubbles (1897) Ford's first play was accepted for production by Herbert Kelcey.
- The Cricket on the Hearth (1905) co-adapted with Lawrence Marston from the novella by Charles Dickens. Produced as a children's play starring Amelia Bingham and Hardee Kirkland at Proctor's Fifth Avenue Theatre during December 1905.
- Cabbages and Kings (1912) Ford and Joseph Medill Patterson adapted two O. Henry stories after his death for this three-act play. It was given a week-long tryout at the Alcazar Theatre in San Francisco on July 1, 1912. Richard Bennett and his wife Mabel Morrison starred.
- Cooper Hoyt, Inc. (1912) Ford wrote this three-act comedy for Liebler & Company, but when he left them it was picked up by Cohan & Harris, and given a tryout at Nixon's Apollo Theatre in Atlantic City during April 1913. The play starred Douglas Fairbanks with Irene Fenwick in support. It was "withdrawn for revisions" after a week.
- It Makes a Difference (1927) co-authored with Edwin Stanley. Three-act play, produced at Chicago's Princess Theatre in January 1928.

== Stage credits ==
=== Actor ===
Selected plays in which Hugh Ford performed, by year of his first appearance.
Year	Play	Role	Venue	Notes/Sources
1889	The Charity Ball		Lyceum Theatre	Ford was an uncredited drama school apprentice for this production.
1890	Men and Women	Mr. Wayne	Proctor's Theatre; Touring company	Ford was on tour with this production through July 1891.
1891	Work and Wages	Bob Dormer	National Theatre (Note: Sometimes referred to as "The National", this venue was located during 1891 on Ridge Avenue between Tenth and Calloway in Philadelphia.)	An English melodrama set in a steel mill that advocated eight hour work days and profit sharing.
1892	The Pulse of New York	Dicey Moran	Touring company	Ford played a bouncer from April 1892 through May 1893.
1893	The Plunger	Walter Glyndon	Touring company	Melodrama by Oliver Doud Byron, with songs, dances, and electrical effects.
1894	A Ride for Life	Giovanna	Touring company	Train melodrama by Walter Fessler, who also starred. Ford played an "Italian rascal".
1895	Masks and Faces	Hundsdon	Columbia Theatre	The Henry E. Dixey company performed at this San Francisco venue.
1895	As You Like It	Adam	Sutro Estate	An al fresco production, with Maurice Barrymore and Rose Coghlan as the leads.
1896	The Lottery of Love	Capt. Sam Merrimac	Touring company	Adapted by Augustin Daly from a work by Alexandre Bisson and Albert Carré.
1896	The Lost Paradise	Schwarz	Grand Opera House (Note: This was in Salt Lake City, Utah.)	By Henry Churchill de Mille, this was Ford's first performance with future wife Jessie Izett.
1897	Doris	Mr. Merriegood	Grand Opera House	Five-act 1895 drama by Robert Drouet had Ford and Izett playing spouses.
1897	The Lights o' London	Clifford Armytage	Grand Opera House	Last production for the Grand Opera House stock company.
1898	A Wife's Peril	Crossley Beck	Imperial Theater	Drama by Victorien Sardou starred Frank Losee in this St. Louis revival.
1899	Romeo and Juliet	Tybalt	Imperial Theater	
1899	As You Like It	Jaques	Olympic Park Theatre	An outdoor venue in St. Louis.
1899	Hamlet	Ghost/Laertes	Olympic Park Theatre	A dual role for Ford while Jessie Izett had a trouser role as Osric.
1900	Diplomacy	Baron Stein	Grand Opera House (Note: This was in Indianapolis, Indiana.)	Ford drew a sketch of his character for this drama by Victorien Sardou.
1900	Trilby	Svengali	Grand Opera House	A rare lead for Ford, while Jessie Izett played Honorine.
1901	Sowing the Wind	Mr. Watkin	Dearborn Theatre (Note: This was located on Randolph Street, between Dearborn and Clark, in Chicago.)	"Problem play" by Sydney Grundy was Ford's first performance with the Dearborn stock company.
1901	The Little Minister	Wearywald	Grand Opera House	Besides his comic character, Ford also directed this 1897 J. M. Barrie play.
1902	Caprice	Jim Baxter	Grand Opera House	An 1884 play by Howard P. Taylor, in which Jesse Izett played Ford's daughter.
1903	A Social Highwayman	Hanby	Fifth Avenue Theatre	A romantic drama by Marie Stone from a story by E. T. Train.
1903	Caste	Old Eccles	Fifth Avenue Theatre	Ford and Jessie Izett had leading roles in this three-act comedy.
1903	Trilby	Svengali	Fifth Avenue Theatre	Besides reprising his role of Svengali, Ford also directed.
1904	Her First Offense		Fifth Avenue Theatre	One-act play by Julius Chambers starred Ford and Jessie Izett.
1904	Audrey		Fifth Avenue Theatre	Adaptation by Harriet Ford of a Mary Johnston novel.

=== Director and producer ===
Selected plays which Hugh Ford directed and/or produced by year.
Year	Play	Role	Venue	Notes/Sources
1898	Our Boys	(Director)	East End Theatre	Ford's first known directorial credit was for an amateur benefit in Pittsburgh.
1901	The Little Minister	(Director)	Grand Opera House	The first of many plays Ford would direct for the Hopkins stock company.
1902	Caprice	(Director)	Grand Opera House	Ford's last directorial role for the Hopkins stock company.
1903	Pair of Boots	(Director)	Fifth Avenue Theatre	One-act marital farce by Julius Chambers.
1903	Trilby	(Director)	Fifth Avenue Theatre	Ford both directed and reprised his role of Svengali in this four-act drama.
1905	The Prodigal Son	(Co-Director)	New Amsterdam Theatre	Ford co-directed with Murray Carson in his first job for Liebler & Company.
1906	The Vanderbilt Cup	(Director)	Parsons Theatre; Broadway Theatre	Musical by Robert Hood Bowers and Sydney Rosenfeld starred 16-year-old Elsie Janis in her Broadway debut.
1907	Salomy Jane	(Director)	Liberty Theatre	The play had no tryouts; its first public performance was its Broadway premiere.
1907	The Man from Home	(Director)	Astor Theatre	
1908	The Melting Pot	(Director)	Comedy Theatre	
1909	Alias Jimmy Valentine	(Director)	Wallack's Theatre	Written by Paul Armstrong from a story by O. Henry.
1909	The Dawn of a Tomorrow	(Director)	Lyceum Theatre	Eleanor Robson starred in this drama by Frances Hodgson Burnett.
1910	The Deep Purple	(Director)	Lyric Theatre	Melodrama by Paul Armstrong had Richard Bennett, Emmett Corrigan, and Ada Dwyer.
1910	Pomander Walk	(Director)	Wallack's Theatre	
1911	Disraeli	(Director)	Wallack's Theatre	
1911	The Garden of Allah	(Director)	Century Theatre	
1912	Cabbages and Kings	(Director)	Alcazar Theatre	Ford and Joseph Medill Patterson play based on O. Henry story.
1912	The Daughter of Heaven	(Director)	Century Theatre	Adaptation of La fille du ciel by Pierre Loti and Judith Gautier.
1913	Potash and Perlmutter	(Director)	George M. Cohan's Theatre	George S. Kaufman attributed the success of this long-running show to Ford's uncredited direction.
1913	The Marriage Game	(Director)	Parsons Theatre; Comedy Theatre	Ford staged this Anne Crawford Flexner comedy for John Cort.
1923	Aren't We All?	(Director)	Gaiety Theatre	Broadway debut of a London production by Frederick Lonsdale.
1923	Home Fires	(Director)	39th Street Theatre	Three-act play by Owen Davis ran for seven weeks on Broadway.
1923	The Deep Tangled Wildwood	(Director)/(Co-Producer)	Frazee Theatre	
1924	La vierge folle La couturière de Lunéville; Le passé	(Co-Producer)	Gaiety Theatre	Three French matinees starring Madame Simon were performed during March 1924.
1924	The Rivals	(Co-Producer)	Touring company	Mrs. Fiske starred, with Chauncey Olcott, Tom Wise, and James T. Powers in support.
1924	A Nameless Comedy	(Director)	Montauk Theatre	A gimmick production, inviting audiences to name the play by Mark Reed. (Note: The title eventually selected was Let's Get Rich, which is what the author had originally proposed.)
1925	Ma Pettengill	(Director)/(Co-Producer)	Touring company	Comedy by Owen Davis, adapted from Harry Leon Wilson stories, starred Edna May Oliver, Burr McIntosh, Raymond Hackett, and Jean Ford.
1929	Diana	(Director)/(Assoc. Producer)	Longacre Theatre	Three-act drama starring Mary Nash as a thinly-veiled Isadora Duncan.
1932	The Budget	(Director)/(Co-Producer)	Hudson Theatre	Weak domestic comedy starred Lynne Overman, Mary Lawlor, and Raymond Walburn.

== Filmography ==
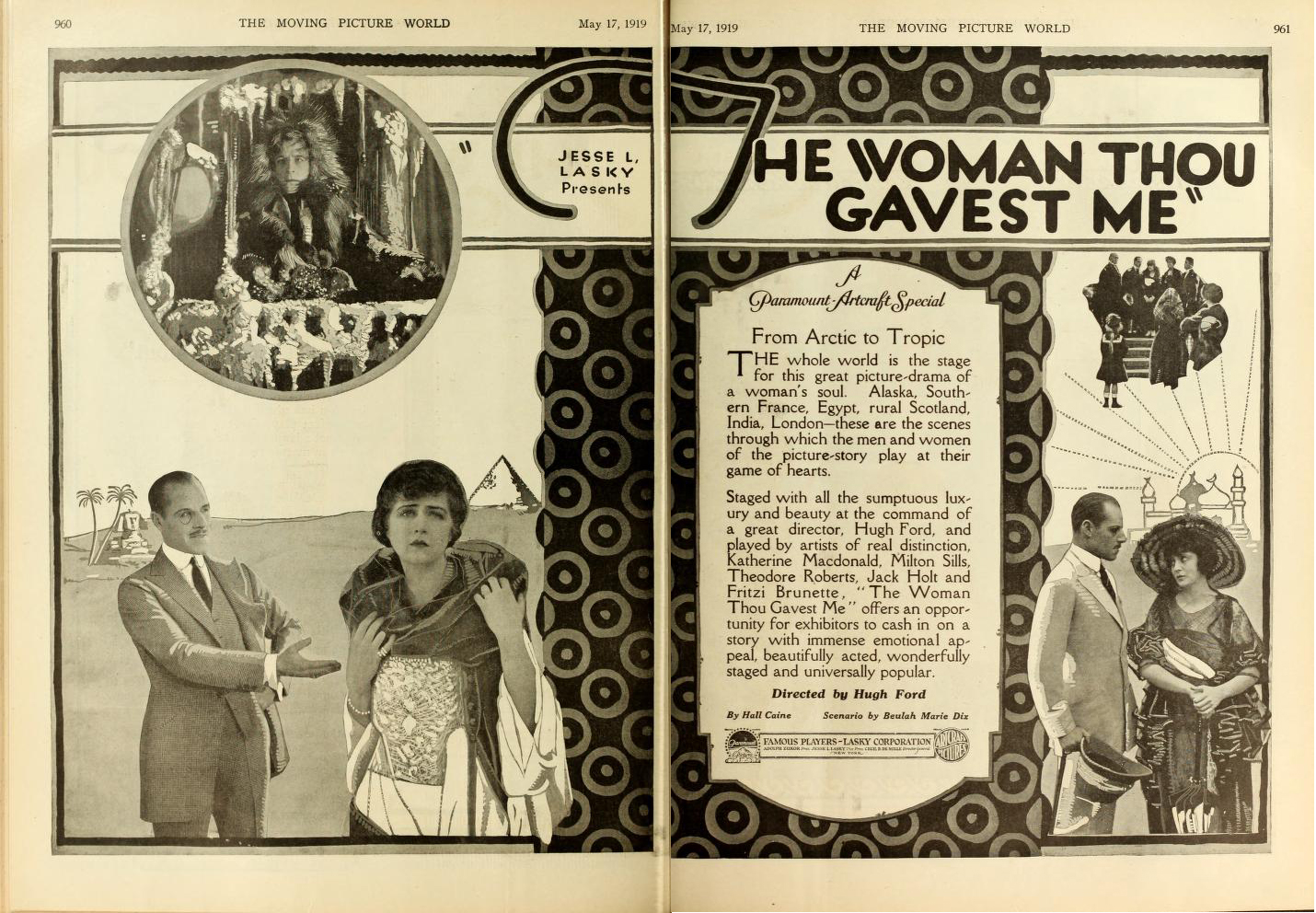
Advertisement (1919)

=== Director ===
- The Prisoner of Zenda (1913) co-director
- Such a Little Queen (1914) co-director
- The Crucible (1914) co-director
- The Morals of Marcus (1915)
- Niobe (1915)
- When We Were Twenty-One (1915)
- Sold (1915)
- Poor Schmaltz (1915)
- The White Pearl (1915)
- Zaza (1915)
- Bella Donna (1915)
- The Prince and the Pauper (1915) co-director
- Lydia Gilmore (1915) co-director
- The Eternal City (1915) co-director
- The Woman in the Case (1916)
- Sleeping Fires (1917)
- The Slave Market (1917)
- Seven Keys to Baldpate (1917)
- Sapho (1917)
- Mrs. Dane's Defense (1918)
- The Danger Mark (1918)
- Mrs. Wiggs of the Cabbage Patch (1919)
- The Woman Thou Gavest Me (1919)
- Secret Service (1919)
- In Mizzoura (1919)
- Civilian Clothes (1920)
- His House in Order (1920)
- Lady Rose's Daughter (1920)
- The Call of Youth (1921)
- The Great Day (1921)
- The Price of Possession (1921)

=== Screenwriter ===
- The Prisoner of Zenda (1913)
- Such a Little Queen (1914)
- The Crucible (1914)
- Jim the Penman (1915)
- Still Waters (1915)
- The Prince and the Pauper (1915)
- The Old Homestead (1915)
- Lydia Gilmore (1915)
- Mice and Men (1916)
- Diplomacy (1916)
- The Innocent Lie (1916)
- Molly Make-Believe (1916)
- The Moment Before (1916)
- The Red Widow (1916)
- Saints and Sinners (1916)
- Silks and Satins (1916)
- Little Lady Eileen (1916)
- Sapho (1916)
- Sleeping Fires (1917)
- His House in Order (1920)

== Bibliography ==
- Robert Grau. Forty Years Observation of Music and the Drama. Broadway Publishing Company, 1909.
- George C. Tyler and J. C. Furnas. Whatever Goes Up. Bobbs Merrill, 1934.
