= Sapho (1917 film) =

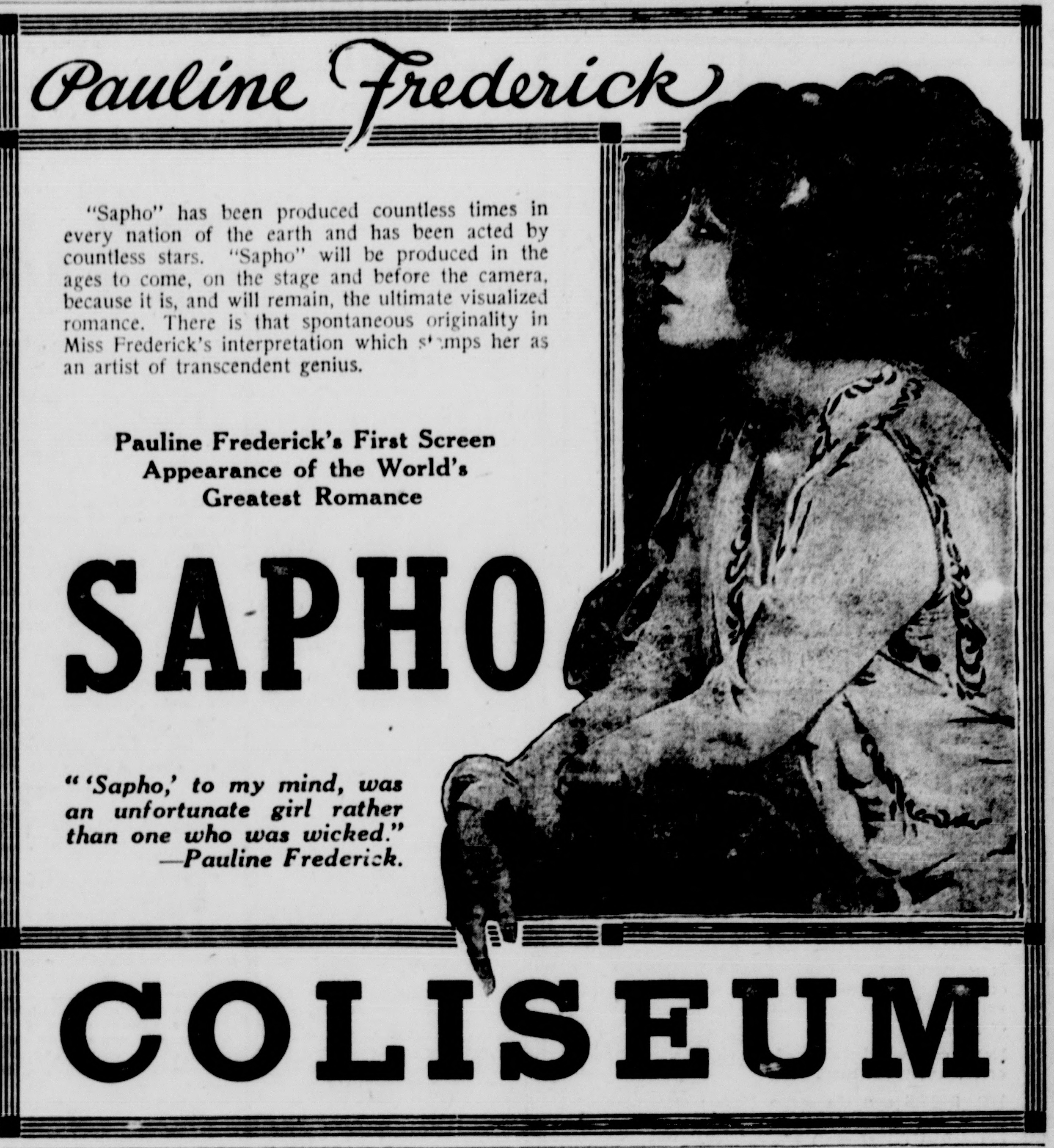
- Newspaper advertisement
- Directed by: Hugh Ford
- Screenplay by: Hugh Ford; Doty Hobart
- Based on: Sappho by Alphonse Daudet
- Produced by: Daniel Frohman
- Starring: Pauline Frederick; Frank Losee; John St. Polis; Pedro de Cordoba; Thomas Meighan
- Cinematography: Ned Van Buren
- Production company: Famous Players Film Company
- Distributed by: Paramount Pictures
- Release date: March 11, 1917
- Running time: 50 minutes
- Country: United States
- Language: Silent (English intertitles)

Sapho is a 1917 American silent drama film directed by Hugh Ford and written by Hugh Ford and Doty Hobart. The film stars Pauline Frederick, Frank Losee, John St. Polis, Pedro de Cordoba, and Thomas Meighan. It is based on the novel Sappho by Alphonse Daudet. The film was released on March 11, 1917, by Paramount Pictures.

The novel had previously been adapted for film twice in 1900, under the titles Sapho and Sapho Kiss, in 1909 and in 1913.

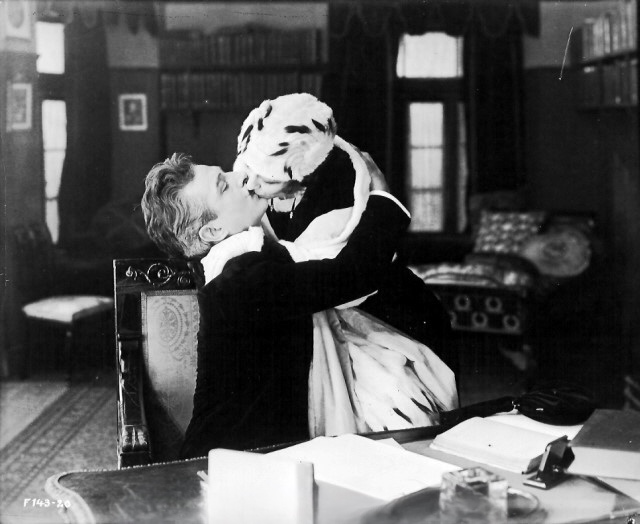
Scene from the film

== Plot ==
Beautiful and poor, Fanny tries to escape from a life of hardship and her drunkard father. She earns her living selling flowers but, one evening, while looking for customers in a restaurant, her beauty catches the attention of Caoudal, a famous sculptor who takes her as his model. Having become his mistress, the young woman begins to love that luxurious life. A poet, a friend of Caoudal and even more famous than him, is inspired by her for his poems. Greedy for success and admiration, Fanny also leaves her new lover, too old for her, for the young engraver Flamant. The latter, mad with love for the woman, wants her to be surrounded by the luxury he loves so much and to make her happy, he breaks the law and ends up in prison.

At a great ball, where she introduces herself as Sapho, Fanny meets Jean, a young provincial unaware of his past. The woman falls deeply in love with him and the two are happy together. But, when Jean finds out who Sapho really is, he leaves her to return to his abandoned girlfriend. In church, during the wedding ceremony, Fanny decides to leave the past behind and start a new life. From that moment, she will join the Red Cross where she will work as a nurse, dedicating herself to her fellow men.

== Cast ==
- Pauline Frederick as Sapho, aka Fanny Lagrand
- Frank Losee as Caoudal
- John St. Polis as Dejoie (credited as John Sainpolis)
- Pedro de Cordoba as Flamant
- Thomas Meighan as Jean Gaussin

== Reception ==
Like many American films of the time, Sapho was subject to cuts by city and state film censorship boards. The Chicago Board of Censors required a cut of the view of Jean pointing at the bed and accusing Sapho.

== Preservation ==
Sapho is currently presumed lost. In February of 2021, the film was cited by the National Film Preservation Board on their Lost U.S. Silent Feature Films list.
