= Robert Warwick =

American actor (1878–1964)

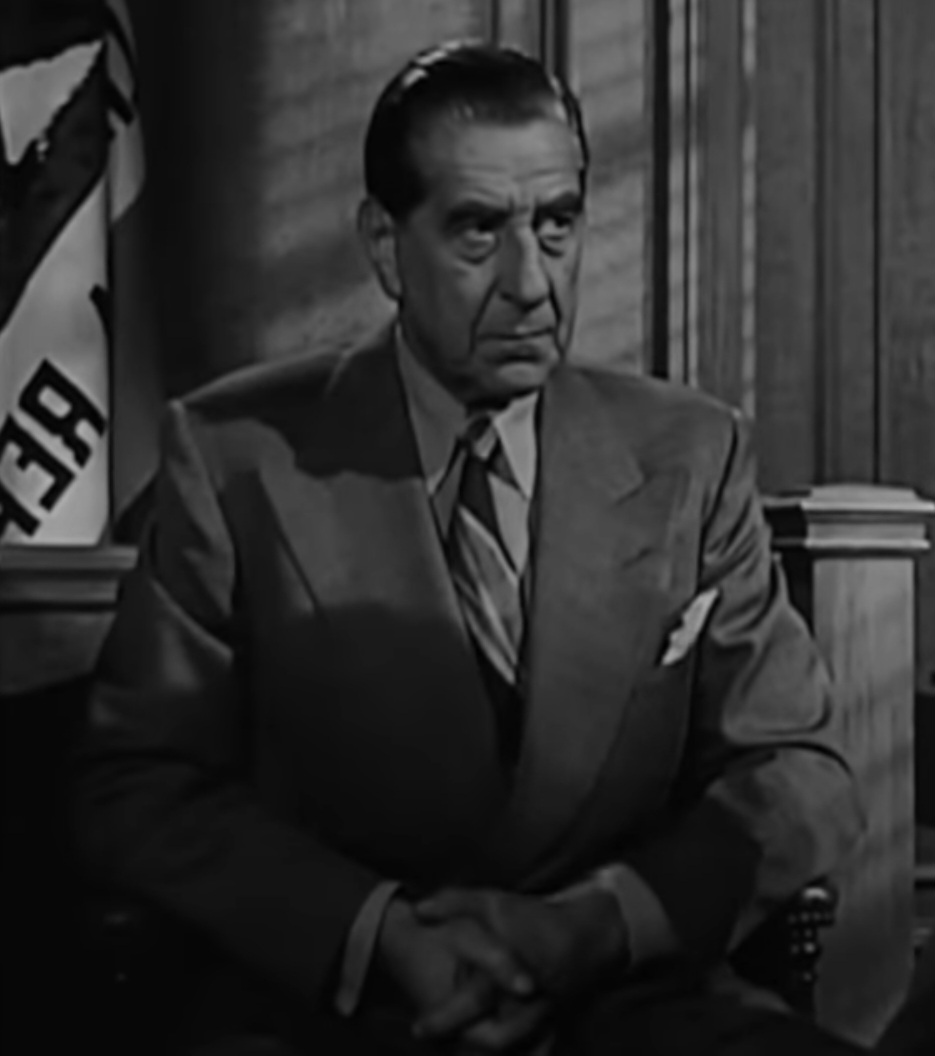
- Warwick in Impact (1949)
- Born: Robert Taylor Bien; October 9, 1878
- Died: June 6, 1964 (aged 85); West Los Angeles, California, U.S.
- Resting place: Holy Cross Cemetery, Culver City
- Occupation: Actor
- Years active: 1903–1960
- Spouses: Arline Peck (m. 1902; div. 1909) Josephine Whittell (m. 1910; div. 19??) Stella Larrimore (m. 1930; died 1960)
- Relatives: Francine Larrimore (sister-in-law)

Robert Warwick (born Robert Taylor Bien; October 9, 1878 – June 6, 1964) was an American stage, film and television actor with over 200 film appearances. A matinee idol during the silent film era, he also prospered after the introduction of sound to cinema. As a young man he had studied opera singing in Paris and had a rich, resonant voice. At the age of 50, he developed as a highly regarded, aristocratic character actor and made numerous "talkies".

== Early life ==
Warwick was born Robert Taylor Bien in 1878 to Louis and Isabel (Taylor) Bien.

Some sources say he was born in England; others say Sacramento, California. His father was of French ethnicity. Bien studied music in Paris and trained for two years to be an opera singer, but acting proved to be his greater calling. He met his future wife, Arline Peck in Paris; the American couple married in 1902. After his return to the United States, he started in theatre and then film.

== Stage ==
Warwick (by then using his stage name) made his Broadway debut in 1903 in the play Glad of It. One of his co-stars was a young John Barrymore, also making his Broadway debut. Both actors, over time, became matinee idols. For the next twenty years Warwick appeared in such plays as Anna Karenina (1906), Two Women (1910), with Mrs. Leslie Carter; and The Kiss Waltz (1911) and Miss Prince (1912), in both of which he was able to display his singing voice.

He also appeared in The Secret (1913), A Celebrated Case (1915) and Drifting (1922) with Alice Brady, not to mention several other plays through the end of the 1920s.

== Military service ==
Warwick served in the U.S. Army during World War I as an infantry captain and as a liaison officer with the French Army.

== Film career ==
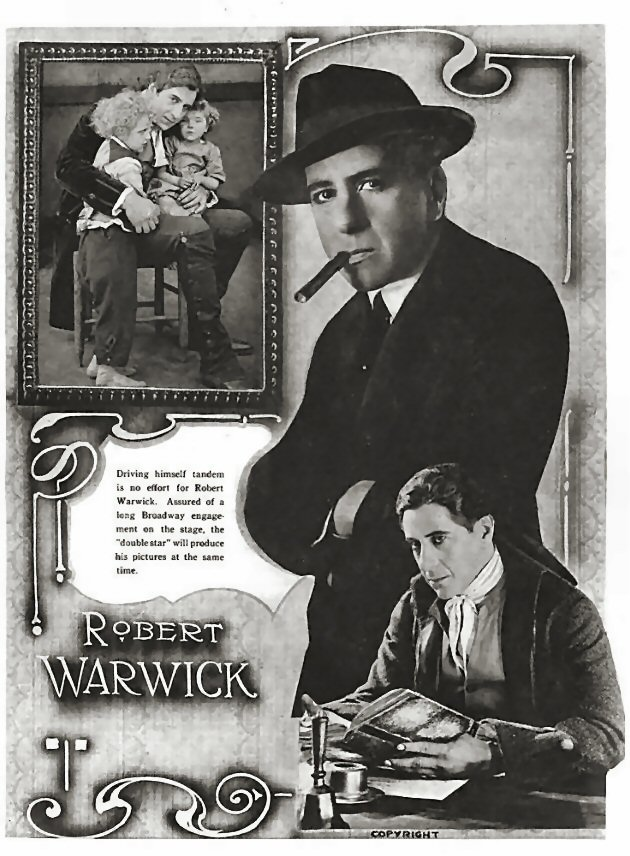
Motion Picture Classic Magazine, 1915

Warwick started making silent films in 1914, with his early work including The Mad Lover (1917) and Thou Art the Man (1920). He made numerous productions in the 1910s primarily in Fort Lee, New Jersey. Two films, Alias Jimmy Valentine and A Girl's Folly, both directed by Maurice Tourneur, have been preserved, and showcase Warwick as a silent actor, as well as Tourneur's directing talent. Both are available in the 21st century on home video.

When the studios moved to Los Angeles, Warwick followed.

From the 1920s on, Warwick alternated doing plays and silent films. He was fifty when sound films arrived, and though middle aged and with his matinee idol looks fading, he found plenty of work in character roles, much enhanced by his rich, resonant voice, eloquent diction, and aristocratic manner.

Warwick's extensive filmography includes such classics as The Little Colonel (1935) with Shirley Temple and The Adventures of Robin Hood (1938) with Errol Flynn. He was one of a number of actors who frequently worked with director Preston Sturges and appeared in many of his films, among them Sullivan's Travels (1941), The Palm Beach Story (1942) and Hail the Conquering Hero (1944). He also appeared again in I Married a Witch (1942), In a Lonely Place (1950), and While the City Sleeps (1956).

== Television and later life ==
Warwick made numerous appearances on television almost from its initial popularity in the late 1940s. In his seventies he was still hard at work and made appearances on every type of television show, from Westerns such as Broken Arrow and Sugarfoot, to the adventure series Rescue 8, to the science fiction series The Twilight Zone, to the anthology series The Loretta Young Show.

== Personal life ==
Warwick married Arline Peck in 1902; they had a daughter, Rosalind. They divorced in 1909.

By 1910, Warwick married actress Josephine Whittell (1883–1961), but the childless marriage also ended in divorce.

In 1930 he married Stella Larrimore (1905–1960) (a sister of Francine Larrimore). They had a daughter, Betsey, who later became a poet in Los Angeles.

Warwick died June 6, 1964, in West Los Angeles, California, at age 85. He was buried in Holy Cross Cemetery, Culver City. Survivors included his daughters and two grandchildren.

== Complete filmography ==
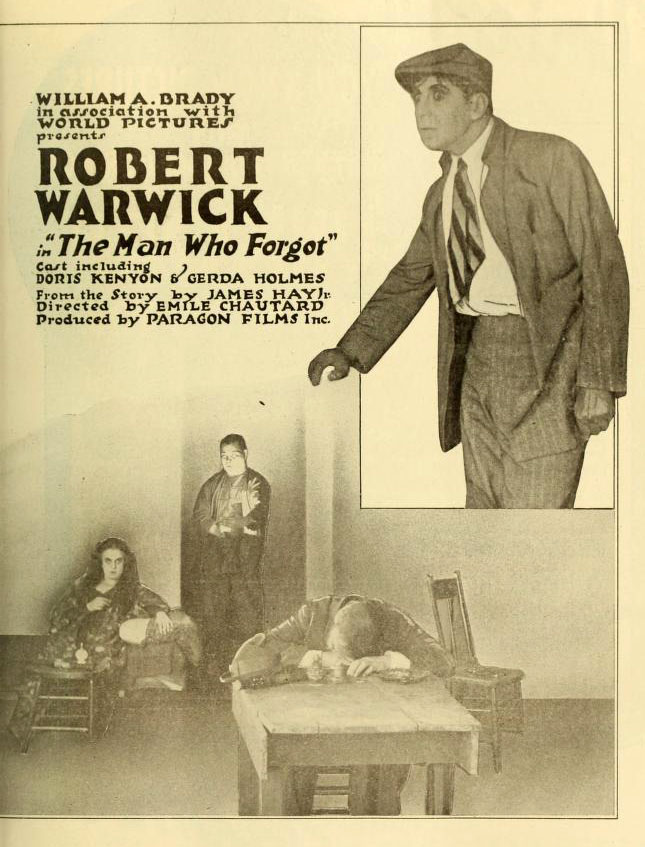
The Man Who Forgot (1917)

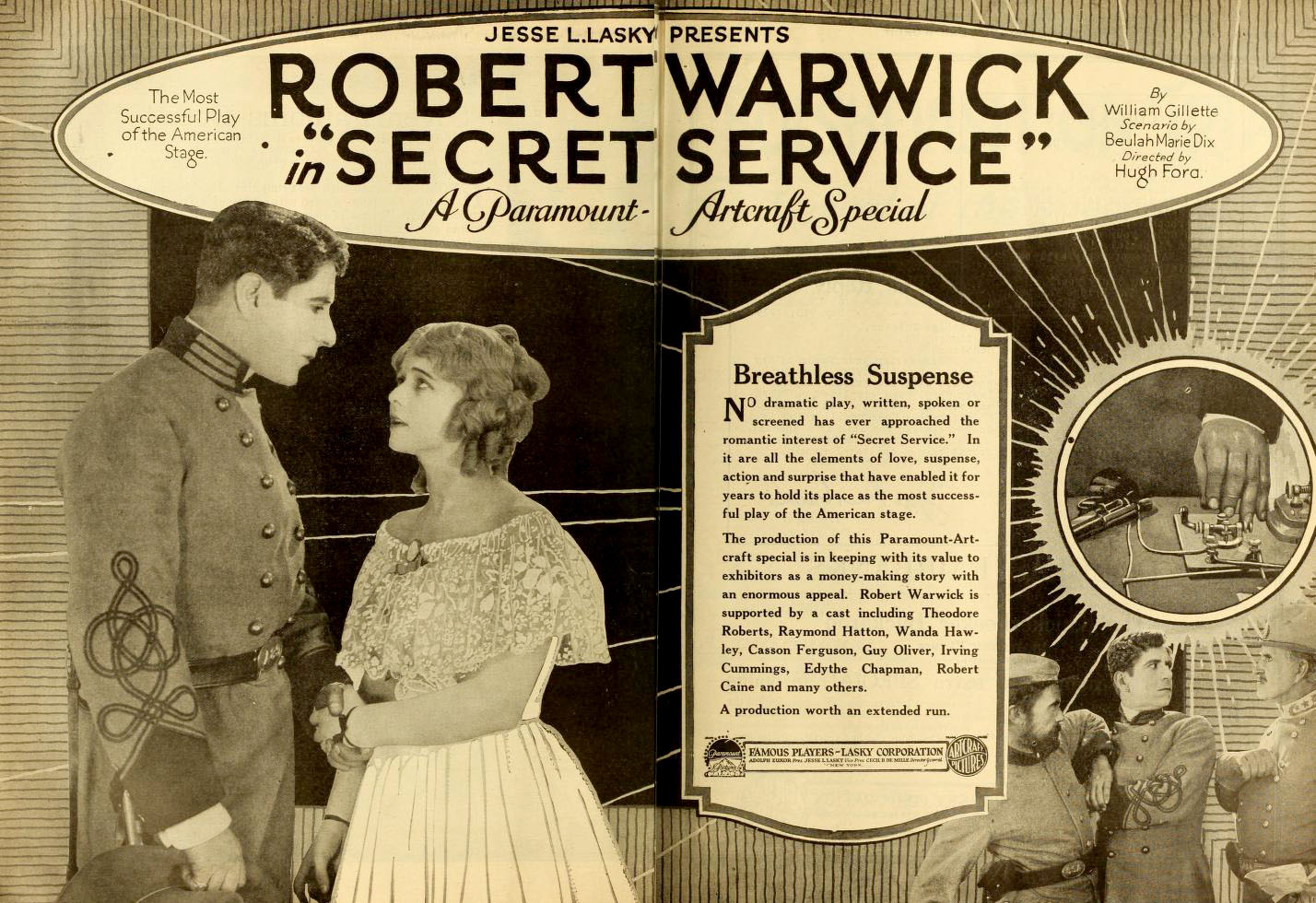
Secret Service (1919)

=== Silent ===
- The Dollar Mark (1914) as James "Jim" Gresham
- The Man of the Hour (1914, extant) as Henry Garrison
- Across the Pacific (1914, extant) as Minor Role (unconfirmed and uncredited)
- Alias Jimmy Valentine (1915, extant) as Jimmy Valentine
- The Man Who Found Himself (1915) as James Clarke
- An Indian Diamond (1915 short)
- The Face in the Moonlight (1915) as Victor / Rabat
- The Stolen Voice (1915, extant, Library of Congress) as Gerald D'Orville
- The Flash of an Emerald (1915) as Lucius Waldeck
- The Sins of Society (1915) as Captain Dorian March
- Fruits of Desire (1916) as Mark Truitt
- The Supreme Sacrifice (1916) as David Aldrich
- Human Driftwood (1916, lost) as Robert Hendricks
- Sudden Riches (1916) as Robert Crewe
- Friday the 13th (1916) as Robert Brownley
- The Heart of a Hero (1916, extant) as Nathan Hale
- All Man (1916) as Jim Blake
- The Man Who Forgot (1917, lost) as The Man, later known as John Smith
- A Girl's Folly (1917, extant) as Kenneth Driscoll
- The Argyle Case (1917, lost) as Asche Kayton
- Hell Hath No Fury (1917)
- The Family Honor (1917) as Captain Stephen Wayne
- The False Friend (1917) as William Ramsdell
- The Silent Master (1917) as Valentin, aka Monsieur Simon
- The Mad Lover (1917) as Robert Hyde
- The Accidental Honeymoon (1918, incomplete, fragment in the Library of Congress) as Robert Courtland
- Secret Service (1919, lost) as Major Lewis K. Dumont
- Told in the Hills (1919, extant, Gosfilmofond) as Jack Stuart
- In Mizzoura (1919, lost) as Jim Radburn
- An Adventure in Hearts (1919, lost) as Captain Dieppe
- The Tree of Knowledge (1920, lost) as Nigel Stanyon
- Jack Straw (1920, extant) as Jack Straw
- Thou Art the Man (1920, lost) as Myles Calthrope
- The City of Masks (1920, lost) as Tommy Trotter
- The Fourteenth Man (1920, lost) as Captain Douglas Gordon
- The Spitfire (1924, lost) as Oliver Blair

=== Sound ===
- Unmasked (1929) as Craig Kennedy
- The Royal Bed (1931) as Premier Northrup - Prime Minister
- Not Exactly Gentlemen (1931) as Layne Hunter
- A Holy Terror (1931) as John Bard aka Thomas Woodbury
- The Woman from Monte Carlo (1932) as Morbraz
- So Big! (1932) as Simeon Peake, Gambler
- The Rich Are Always with Us (1932) as The Doctor
- The Dark Horse (1932) as Mr. Clark
- Unashamed (1932) as Mr. Ogden
- Doctor X (1932) as Police Commissioner Stevens
- The Girl from Calgary (1932) as Bill Webster
- I Am a Fugitive from a Chain Gang (1932) as Fuller
- Afraid to Talk (1932) as Jake Stranskey
- Silver Dollar (1932) as Colonel Stanton
- The Secrets of Wu Sin (1932) as Roger King
- Frisco Jenny (1932) as Kelly (uncredited)
- Ladies They Talk About (1933) as Warden (uncredited)
- Racetrack (1933) as Minor Role (uncredited)
- The Three Musketeers (1933, Serial) as Colonel Brent [Ch. 1]
- The Whispering Shadow (1933 serial) as Detective Robert Raymond
- Fighting with Kit Carson (1933) as Chief Dark Eagle (uncredited)
- Pilgrimage (1933) as Major Albertson
- The Power and the Glory (1933) as Edward - Chairman of Board Meeting (uncredited)
- Charlie Chan's Greatest Case (1933) as Dan Winterslip
- Female (1933) as Attorney Bradley (uncredited)
- Jimmy the Gent (1934) as Probate Judge Kalsmeyer (uncredited)
- School for Girls (1934) as Governor
- No Sleep on the Deep (1934 short) as Emerson Eldridge
- Midnight Alibi (1934) as Assistant District Attorney (uncredited)
- The Dragon Murder Case (1934) as Dr. Halliday
- Cleopatra (1934) as General Achillas
- A Shot in the Dark (1935) as Joseph Harris
- The Little Colonel (1935) as Colonel Gray
- Night Life of the Gods (1935) as Neptune
- Code of the Mounted (1935) as Inspector Malloy
- The Murder Man (1935) as Colville
- Hop-Along Cassidy (1935) as Jim Meeker
- The Farmer Takes a Wife (1935) as Junius Brutus Booth (uncredited)
- Anna Karenina (1935) as Colonel at Banquet (uncredited)
- Two Sinners (1935) as Minor Role (uncredited)
- Bars of Hate (1935) as The Governor
- Timber War (1935) as Ferguson
- The Fighting Marines (1935, Serial) as Colonel W. R. Bennett
- A Thrill for Thelma (1935, Short) as Captain Richard Kyne (uncredited)
- Whipsaw (1935) as Robert W. Wadsworth
- A Tale of Two Cities (1935) as Judge at Tribunal
- Tough Guy (1936) as Mr. Frederick Martindale Vincent II
- The Return of Jimmy Valentine (1936) as Jimmy Davis
- Sutter's Gold (1936) as General Alexander Rotscheff
- The Bride Walks Out (1936) as Mr. McKenzie
- Mary of Scotland (1936) as Sir Francis Knollys
- Charlie Chan at the Race Track (1936) as Police Chief (uncredited)
- Romeo and Juliet (1936) as Lord Montague
- The Vigilantes Are Coming (1936, Serial) as Count Ivan Raspinoff
- Bulldog Edition (1936) as Evans
- In His Steps (1936) as Judge Grey
- Adventure in Manhattan (1936) as Phillip
- Can This Be Dixie? (1936) as Winston
- White Legion (1936) as Captain Parker
- Can This Be Dixie? (1936) as General Beauregard Peachtree
- The Bold Caballero (1936) as Governor Palma
- Give Me Liberty (1936, Short) as George Washington
- High Hat (1937) as Craig Dupont Sr.
- Woman in Distress (1937) as Van Alsten (uncredited)
- Let Them Live (1937) as The Mayor
- The Prince and the Pauper (1937) as Lord Warwick
- The Road Back (1937) as Judge
- Souls at Sea (1937) as Vice Admiral (uncredited)
- The Life of Emile Zola (1937) as Major Henry
- Jungle Menace (1937 serial) as Chief Inspector Angus MacLeod
- Fit for a King (1937) as Prime Minister
- Counsel for Crime (1937) as Asa Stewart
- The Trigger Trio (1937) as John Evans
- The Awful Truth (1937) as Mr. Vance
- Conquest (1937) as Captain Laroux (uncredited)
- The Spy Ring (1938) as Colonel Burdette
- The Adventures of Robin Hood (1938) as Sir Geoffrey
- Law of the Plains (1938) as Willard McGowan
- Blockade (1938) as Vallejo
- Squadron of Honor (1938) as Kimball
- Come On, Leathernecks! (1938) as Colonel Butler
- Army Girl (1938) as Brigadier General Matthews
- Gangster's Boy (1938) as Tim Kelly
- Annabel Takes a Tour (1938) as Race Track Announcer (uncredited)
- Going Places (1938) as Frome
- Fighting Thoroughbreds (1939) as Commissioner (uncredited)
- Devil's Island (1939) as Demonpre
- Almost a Gentleman (1939) as Major Mabrey
- Juarez (1939) as Major Du Pont (uncredited)
- The Magnificent Fraud (1939) as General Pablo Hernandez
- In Old Monterey (1939) as Major Forbes
- Konga, the Wild Stallion (1939) as Jordan Hadley
- The Ash Can Fleet (1939, Short) as Von Hindenberg (uncredited)
- The Private Lives of Elizabeth and Essex (1939) as Lord Mountjoy
- La Inmaculada (1939)
- Four Wives (1939) as Mr. Roberts (scenes deleted)
- The Earl of Chicago (1940) as Clerk at Parliament (uncredited)
- Teddy, the Rough Rider (1940, Short) as Captain Leonard Wood (uncredited)
- Murder in the Air (1940) as Doctor Finchley
- On the Spot (1940) as Cyrus Haddon
- New Moon (1940) as Commissar
- The Sea Hawk (1940) as Frobisher
- The Great McGinty (1940) as Opposition Speaker (uncredited)
- A Dispatch from Reuter's (1940) as Opposition Parliament Speaker (uncredited)
- Christmas in July (1940) as Juror (uncredited)
- The Lady Eve (1941) as Passenger on Ship (uncredited)
- A Woman's Face (1941) as Associate Judge
- This England (1941) (uncredited)
- I Was a Prisoner on Devil's Island (1941) as Governor
- Sullivan's Travels (1941) as Mr. LeBrand
- Louisiana Purchase (1941) as Speaker of the House
- Cadets on Parade (1942) as Colonel Metcalfe
- The Fleet's In (1942) as Admiral Wright
- Eagle Squadron (1942) as Bullock
- Secret Enemies (1942) as Otto Zimmer, aka Dr. Woodford
- The Palm Beach Story (1942) as Mr. Hinch
- I Married a Witch (1942) as J.B. Masterson
- Tennessee Johnson (1942) as Major Crooks
- Two Tickets to London (1943) as Ormsby
- Dixie (1943) as Mr. LaPlant
- Women at War (1943 short) as Major General "Blood and Thunder" Travis
- Deerslayer (1943) as Chief Uncas
- In Old Oklahoma (1943) as Chief Big Tree (uncredited)
- Man from Frisco (1944) as Bruce McRae
- Hail the Conquering Hero (1944) as Marine Colonel (uncredited)
- Kismet (1944) as Alfife
- Bowery to Broadway (1944) as Cliff Brown
- The Princess and the Pirate (1944) as The King
- Sudan (1945) as Maatet
- Criminal Court (1946) as Mr. Marquette
- The Falcon's Adventure (1946) as Kenneth Sutton
- Unconquered (1947) as Pontiac, Chief of the Ottawas (scenes cut)
- Gentleman's Agreement (1947) as Irving Weisman (uncredited)
- Pirates of Monterey (1947) as Governor de Sola
- Fury at Furnace Creek (1948) as General Fletcher Blackwell
- The Three Musketeers (1948) as D'Artagnan Sr. (uncredited)
- Million Dollar Weekend (1948) as Dave Dietrich
- Adventures of Don Juan (1948) as Don José - Count de Polan
- Gun Smugglers (1948) as Colonel Davis
- A Woman's Secret (1949) as Roberts
- Impact (1949) as Captain Callahan
- Francis (1950) as Colonel Carmichael
- In a Lonely Place (1950) as Charlie Waterman
- Tarzan and the Slave Girl (1950) as High Priest
- Vendetta (1950) as The French Prefect
- Sugarfoot (1951) as J.C. Crane
- The Sword of Monte Cristo (1951) as Marquis de Montableau
- The Mark of the Renegade (1951) as Colonel Vega
- The Star (1952) as R.J., Aging Actor at Party
- Against All Flags (1952) as Captain Kidd
- The Mississippi Gambler (1953) as Governor Paul Monet
- Salome (1953) as Courier (uncredited)
- Jamaica Run (1953) as Court Judge
- Raiders of the Seven Seas (1953) as New Governor of Cuba (uncredited)
- Fort Algiers (1953) as Haroon
- The Story of Father Juniper Serra (1954, TV Movie) as Father Serra
- Silver Lode (1954) as Judge Cranston
- Passion (1954) as Padre (uncredited)
- Alfred Hitchcock Presents (1955) (Season 1 Episode 9: "The Long Shot") as Matthew Kelson
- Escape to Burma (1955) as The Sawbwa
- Chief Crazy Horse (1955) as Spotted Tail
- The Hammer and the Sword (1955, TV Movie) as George Washington
- Lady Godiva of Coventry (1955) as Humbert
- While the City Sleeps (1956) as Amos Kyne
- Walk the Proud Land (1956) as Chief Eskiminzin
- Shoot-Out at Medicine Bend (1957) as Brother Abraham
- The Buccaneer (1958) as Captain Lockyer
- Night of the Quarter Moon (1959) as Judge
- It Started with a Kiss (1959) as Congressman Muir
- Song Without End (1960) as Emissary (scenes cut)
- ’’The Twilight Zone’’ (1960) (season 1 Episode 18: “The Last Flight”) as Air Marshall Alexander Mackaye
