= In Mizzoura =

1919 film

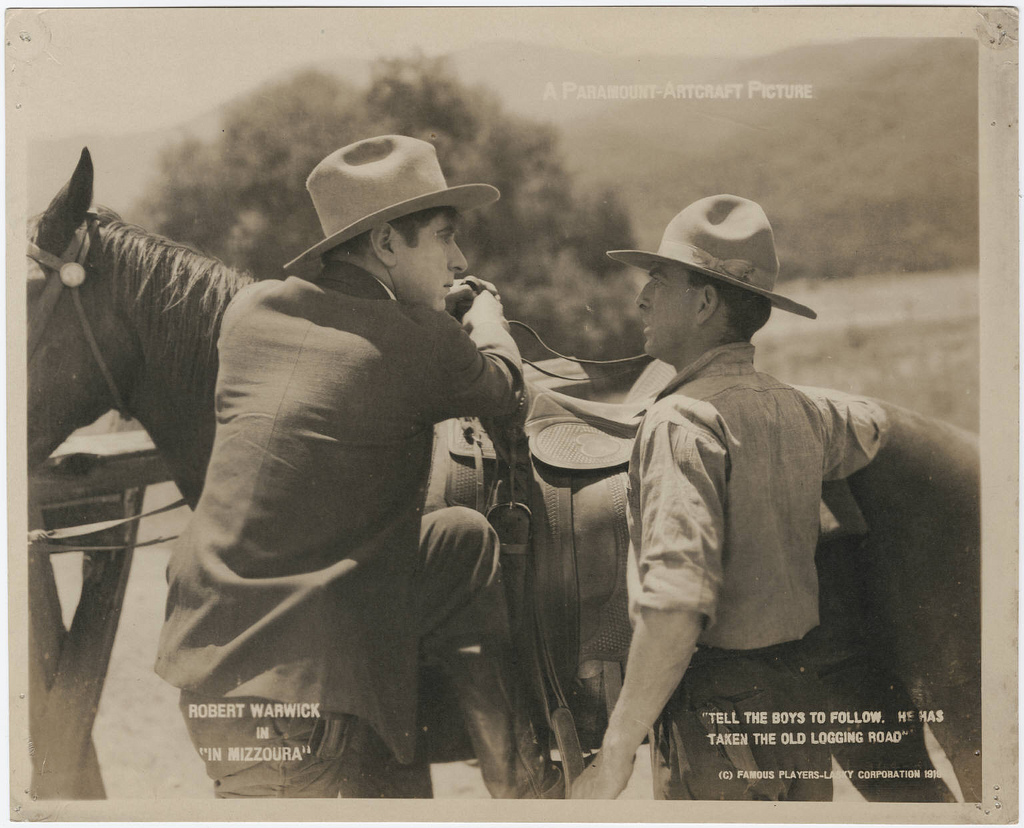
- Lobby card
- Directed by: Hugh Ford
- Written by: Beulah Marie Dix
- Based on: In Mizzoura by Augustus Thomas
- Produced by: Adolph Zukor; Jesse Lasky
- Starring: Robert Warwick
- Cinematography: William Marshall
- Distributed by: Paramount Pictures
- Release date: October 5, 1919
- Running time: 5 reels
- Country: United States
- Languages: Silent; English intertitles

In Mizzoura is a lost 1919 American silent Western film starring Robert Warwick and directed by Hugh Ford. This film is based on the 1890s stage play In Mizzoura by Augustus Thomas. The play was previously filmed in 1914.

== Cast ==
- Robert Warwick as Jim Radburn
- Robert Cain as Robert Travers
- Noah Beery as Jo Vernon
- Eileen Percy as Kate Vernon
- Monte Blue as Sam Fowler
- Milla Davenport as Mrs. Vernon
- Gertrude Short as Lisbeth Vernon
- Hazel Brennon as Emily Radburn
- Victor Potel as Dave
- Robert Morris as Colonel Bollinger
- William H. Brown as Bill Sarber
- Taylor N. Duncan as Clarke (credited as Ted Duncan)
- Guy Oliver as Esrom
