= Sleeping Fires =

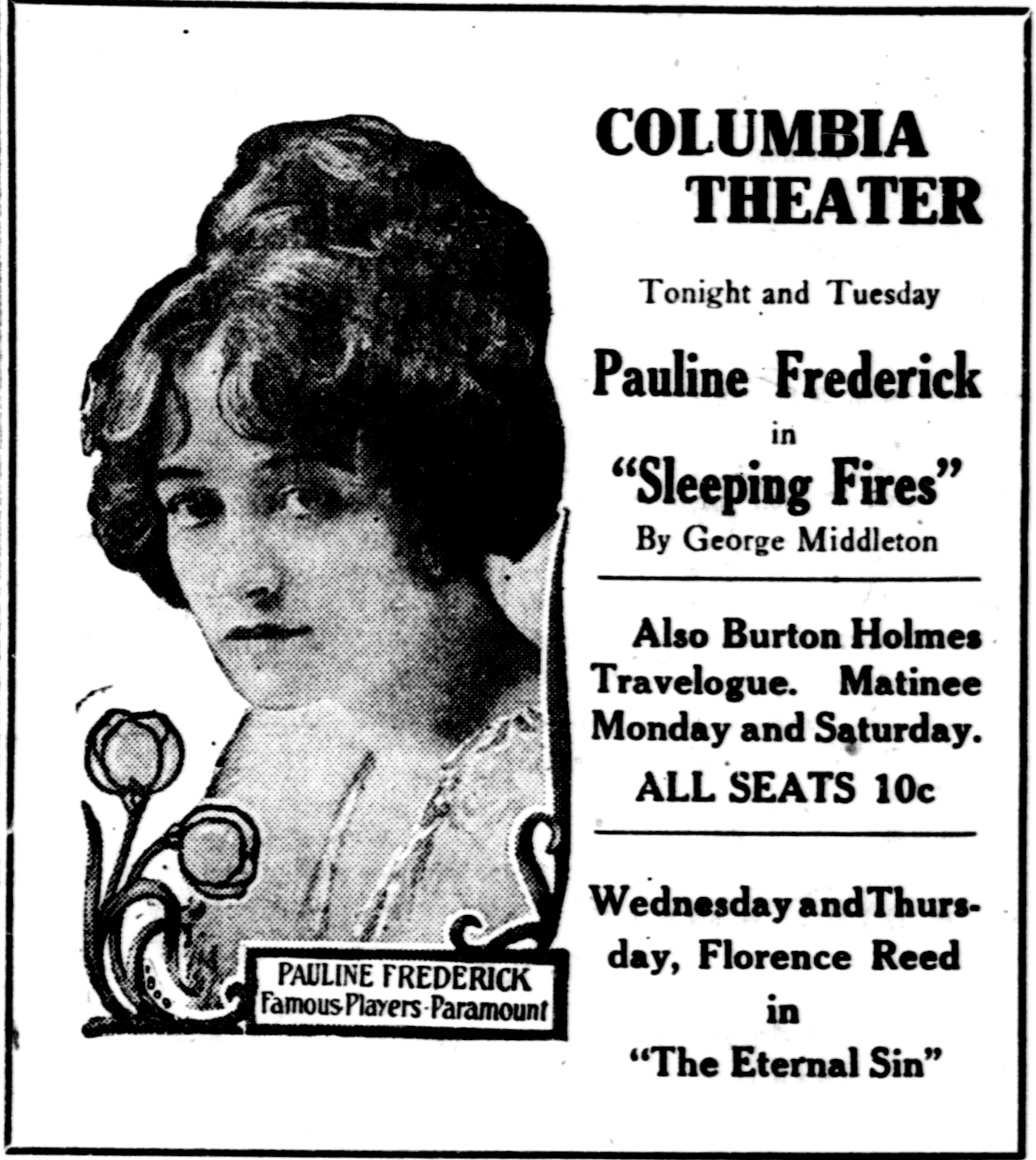
- Newspaper advertisement.
- Directed by: Hugh Ford
- Written by: Hugh Ford (scenario)
- Story by: George Middleton
- Produced by: Daniel Frohman
- Starring: Pauline Frederick
- Cinematography: Ned Van Buren
- Production company: Famous Players–Lasky
- Distributed by: Paramount Pictures
- Release date: April 15, 1917
- Running time: 50 minutes
- Country: United States
- Languages: Silent; English intertitles

Sleeping Fires was a 1917 American silent drama film directed by Hugh Ford, and starring Pauline Frederick. The film held openings at Loew's Columbia Theatre in Mansfield, OH and at Loew's Columbia in Washington, D.C.

== Cast ==
- Pauline Frederick as Zelma Bryce
- Maurice Steuart as The Little Fellow
- Helen Dahl as Helen King
- Thomas Meighan as David Gray
- Joseph W. Smiley as Joe Giles
- John St. Polis as Edwin Bryce

== Censorship ==
Before Sleeping Fires could be exhibited in Kansas, the Kansas Board of Review required the removal of the love and breakfast scenes between Bryce and secretary, and to replace the intertitle "The new housekeeper," with "Several months later, through the influence of his money, Bryce has obtained a divorce and remarried."

== Preservation ==
Sleeping Fires is currently presumed lost. In February of 2021, the film was cited by the National Film Preservation Board on their Lost U.S. Silent Feature Films list.

== See also ==
- List of lost films
