= Secret Service (1919 film) =

1919 film by Hugh Ford

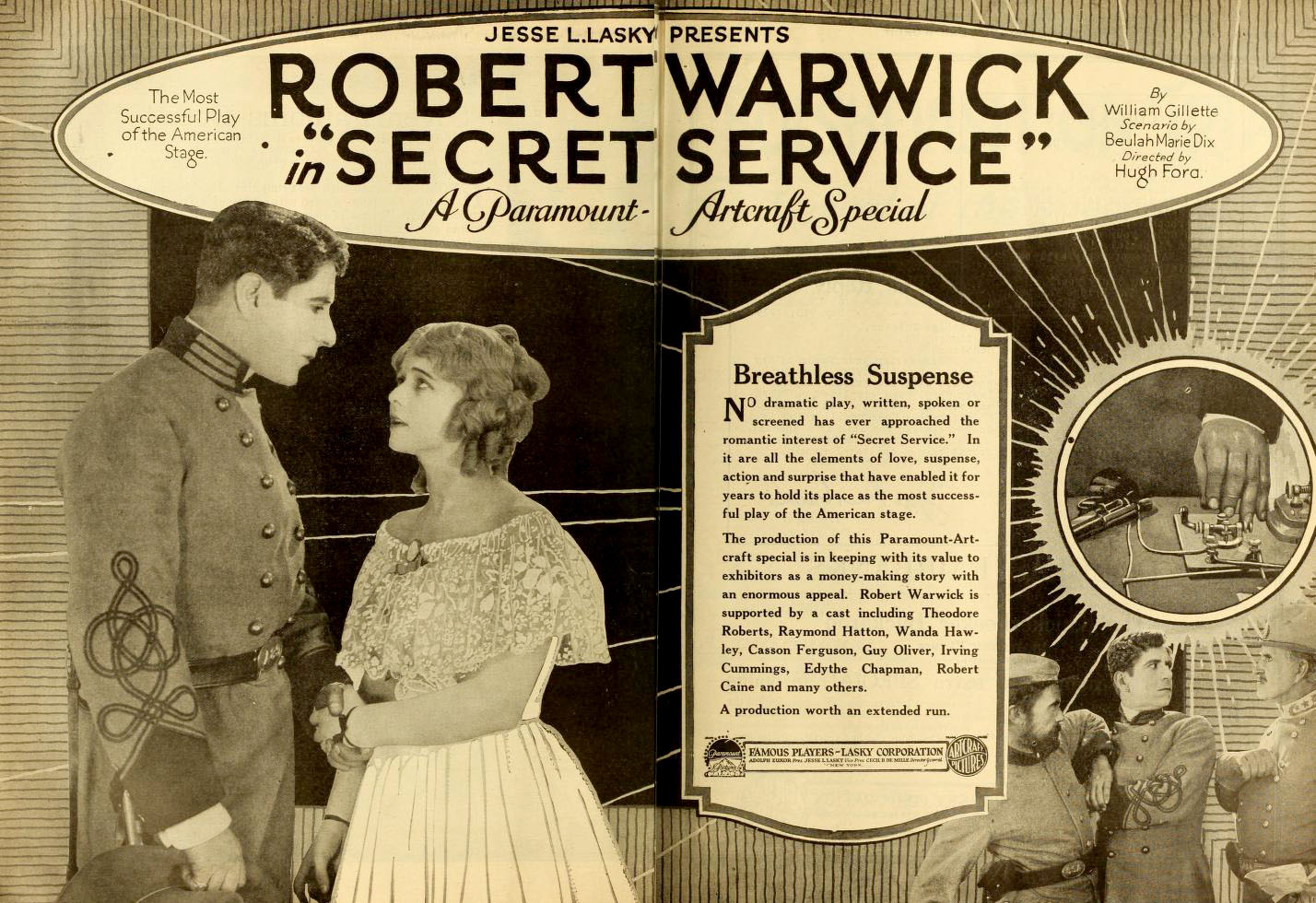
- Lobby art
- Directed by: Hugh Ford; Joe Boyle (assistant director)
- Written by: Beulah Marie Dix (scenario)
- Based on: Secret Service (play) by William Gillette
- Produced by: Adolph Zukor; Jesse Lasky
- Starring: Robert Warwick; Wanda Hawley
- Cinematography: William Marshall
- Distributed by: Paramount Pictures
- Release date: June 15, 1919
- Running time: 60 minutes; 6 reels
- Country: United States
- Language: Silent (English intertitles)

Secret Service is a lost 1919 American silent American Civil War drama film starring Robert Warwick and directed by Hugh Ford. It was produced by Famous Players–Lasky and distributed by Paramount Pictures. Based on the play Secret Service by William Gillette (New York, 5 Oct 1896), it was remade as a talking picture by RKO in 1931.

One of the story’s chief plot twists is referenced in the 1923 short story "Devil Cat", featuring Carroll John Daly’s hard boiled detective Race Williams.

== Cast ==
- Robert Warwick as Major Lewis K. Dumont
- Wanda Hawley as Edith Varney
- Theodore Roberts as General Harrison Randolph
- Edythe Chapman as Mrs. Varney
- Raymond Hatton as Lt. Howard Varney
- Casson Ferguson as Wilfred Varney
- Robert Cain as Captain Henry Dumont
- Irving Cummings as Benton Arrelsford
- Guy Oliver as Jonas
- Lillian Leighton as Martha
- Stanley Wheatcroft as Lt. Maxwell (*Stanhope Wheatcroft)
- Shirley Mason as Caroline Mitford

== Reception ==
Variety's review was largely positive, finding the cast to be "carefully chosen" and the interiors to be "magnificent." The reviewer did not believe that the film adaptation was as good as the stage version, but found it to be a decent substitute for "those who have not been fortunate enough to see the play."

== See also ==
- List of films and television shows about the American Civil War
