= John St. Polis =

American actor (1873–1946)

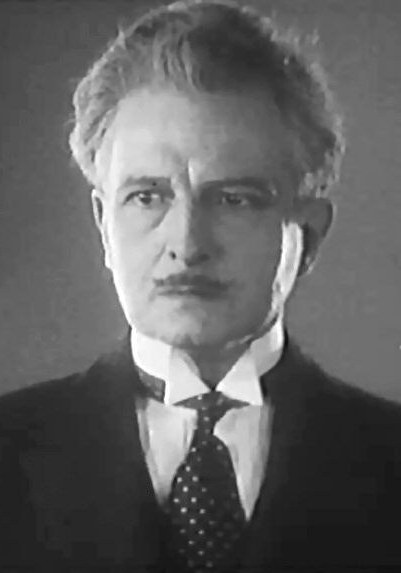
- St. Polis in The Unknown (1927)
- Born: John Marie Sainpolis; November 24, 1873; New Orleans, Louisiana, U.S.
- Died: October 8, 1946 (aged 72); Los Angeles, California, U.S.
- Occupation: Actor
- Years active: 1909–1943

John M. St. Polis (born John Marie Sainpolis; November 24, 1873 – October 8, 1946) was an American actor.

== Biography ==
St. Polis was born John Marie Sainpolis in New Orleans, Louisiana, the son of Jean Marie Sainpolis and Marie Catherine Borg. Before starting his film career, he made a name for himself on the Broadway stage, most notably in the role of Frederik in the original production of The Return of Peter Grimm (1911–12) and the play's revival in 1921, both performed at the Belasco Theatre. He also appeared in a different role in the screen version in 1926.

He appeared in more than 120 films between 1914 and 1943. In all of his early roles, the actor is billed as John Sainpolis. His best-known performances are as Etienne Laurier in The Four Horsemen of the Apocalypse (1921), and as Comte Phillipe de Chagny in The Phantom of the Opera (1925). He successfully made the transition from silent cinema to "talkies" with one of his most praised performances as Dr. John M. Besant, the father of Norma Besant (played by Mary Pickford) in Coquette (1929). He died on October 8, 1946, in Los Angeles, California from undisclosed causes, aged 72.

== Selected filmography ==
- Soldiers of Fortune (1914) - Pres. Alvarez
- Joseph and His Coat of Many Colors (1914)
- Wormwood (1915) - Gaston Beauvais
- Bondwomen (1915) - Dr. Hugh Ellis
- The Salamander (1916) - Albert Sassoon
- The Yellow Passport (1916) - Fedia
- The Social Highwayman (1916) - Hanby
- The World Against Him (1916) - Dr. Hamilton Welsh
- The Fortunes of Fifi (1917) - Duvernet
- Sapho (1917) - Dejoie
- Sleeping Fires (1917) - Edwin Bryce
- The Mystic Hour (1917) - Clavering
- The Love That Lives (1917) - Harvey Brooks
- Public Defender (1917) - David Moulton
- The Mark of Cain (1917) - Judge Hoyt
- Resurrection (1918) - Simonson
- All Woman (1918) - Sam Tupper
- Money Mad (1918) - Martin Ross
- Laughting Bill Hyde (1918) - Black Jack Burg
- Stake Uncle Sam to Play Your Hand (1918)
- The Poison Pen (1919) - Dr. McKenna
- The Great Lover (1920) - Jean Paurel
- Old Dad (1920) - Jeffrey Bretton
- The Four Horsemen of the Apocalypse (1921) - Etienne Laurier
- Cappy Ricks (1921) - Skinner
- Shadows (1922) - Nate Snow
- The Hero (1923) - Andrew Lane
- Three Wise Fools (1923) - John Crawshay
- The Untameable (1923) - Dr. Copin
- A Prince of a King (1923) - Mario
- Woman-Proof (1923) - Milo Bleech
- The Social Code (1923) - Defense Attorney
- Held to Answer (1923) - Hiram Burbeck
- A Fool's Awakening (1924) - Lt. Wedderburn
- Three Weeks (1924) - The King
- Mademoiselle Midnight (1924) - Colonel de Gontran (Prologue)
- Those Who Dance (1924) - Monahan
- The Alaskan (1924) - Rossland
- In Every Woman's Life (1924) - Dr. Philip Logan
- The Rose of Paris (1924) - André du Vallois
- The Folly of Vanity (1924) - Ridgeway (modern sequence)
- The Dixie Handicap (1924) - Dexter
- The Phantom of the Opera (1925) - Comte Philip de Chagny
- My Lady's Lips (1925) - Inspector
- Paint and Powder (1925) - Mark Kelsey
- The Far Cry (1926) - Count Filippo Sturani
- The Greater Glory (1926) - Prof. Leopold Eberhardt
- The Lily (1926) - Comte de Maigny
- The Return of Peter Grimm (1926) - Andrew McPherson (uncredited)
- Too Many Crooks (1927) - Erastus Mason
- The Unknown (1927) - Surgeon (uncredited)
- A Woman's Way (1928) - Mouvet
- The Grain of Dust (1928) - Mr. Burroughs
- The Power of Silence (1928) - Defense Attorney
- Marriage by Contract (1928) - Father
- The Gun Runner (1928) - The Presidente
- The Diplomats (1929, Short) - The King of Belgravia
- Why Be Good? (1929) - Pa Kelly
- Coquette (1929) - Dr. John Besant
- Fast Life (1929) - Andrew Stratton
- Party Girl (1930) - John Rountree
- The Melody Man (1930) - Von Kemper
- In the Next Room (1930) - Philip Vantine
- Guilty? (1930) - Polk
- The Three Sisters (1930) - Judge
- The Bad One (1930) - Judge
- A Devil with Women (1930) - Don Diego
- Kismet (1930) - The Imam Mahmud
- Captain Thunder (1930) - Pedro
- The Criminal Code (1931) - Dr. Rinewulf
- Beau Ideal (1931) - Judge Advocate
- Doctors' Wives (1931) - Dr. Mark Wyndram
- Transgression (1931) - Serafin, Arturo's Butler
- Men of the Sky (1931) - Madeleine's Father
- Their Mad Moment (1931) - Hotel Manager
- The Gay Diplomat (1931) - General
- The Yellow Ticket (1931) - Passport Official at Airport (uncredited)
- Heartbreak (1931) - U.S. Ambassador
- The Wide Open Spaces (1931, Short) - Townsman
- Alias the Doctor (1932) - Dr. Niergardt
- Lena Rivers (1932) - John Nichols
- Symphony of Six Million (1932) - Dr. Schifflen
- Forbidden Company (1932) - David Grant
- The Crusader (1932) - Robert Henley
- False Faces (1932) - Dr. McDonald (uncredited)
- If I Had a Million (1932) - Glidden Associate (uncredited)
- The Gambling Sex (1932) - John Tracy
- Call Her Savage (1932) - Doctor Consoling Nasa (uncredited)
- The Match King (1932) - Banker (uncredited)
- Terror Trail (1932) - Colonel Charles Ormsby
- The World Gone Mad (1933) - Grover Cromwell
- King of the Arena (1933) - Governor
- Cocktail Hour (1933) - French Police Investigator (uncredited)
- Notorious but Nice (1933) - John J. Martin
- Sing Sinner Sing (1933) - James Parks (uncredited)
- Guilty Parents (1934) - Defense Attorney
- The President Vanishes (1934) - Attorney General Davis (uncredited)
- Death from a Distance (1935) - Prof. Trowbridge
- The Lady in Scarlet (1935) - Jerome T. Shelby
- A Night at the Opera (1935) - Opera Conductor (uncredited)
- Magnificent Obsession (1935) - Seabury (uncredited)
- The Dark Hour (1936) - Dr. Munro
- Call of the Prairie (1936) - Banker Jim (uncredited)
- Three on the Trail (1936) - Sheriff Sam Corwin
- Below the Deadline (1936) - Mr. Abrams
- The Border Patrolman (1936) - Manning (uncredited)
- Woman in Distress (1937) - Duval (uncredited)
- Borderland (1937) - The Doctor
- A Day at the Races (1937) - Musician in orchestra (uncredited)
- Paradise Isle (1937) - Coxon
- Rustlers' Valley (1937) - Banker Crawford (uncredited)
- Jungle Menace (1937, Serial) - Chandler Elliott [Ch. 1]
- The Shadow Strikes (1937) - Caleb Delthern
- Saleslady (1938) - Crane
- International Crime (1938) - Roger Morton
- Phantom Ranger (1938) - Pat Doyle
- The Mysterious Rider (1938) - Townsman (uncredited)
- Mr. Wong, Detective (1938) - Carl Roemer
- Boys' Reformatory (1939) - Superintendent Keene
- They Shall Have Music (1939) - Davis
- Abe Lincoln in Illinois (1940) - Minor Role (uncredited)
- Knights of the Range (1940) - Doctor (uncredited)
- Rocky Mountain Rangers (1940) - Joseph Manners
- On the Spot (1940) - Doc Hunter
- Haunted House (1940) - Simkins
- Federal Fugitives (1941) - Doctor (uncredited)
- The Hard-Boiled Canary (1941) - Opera Conductor (uncredited)
- Hurricane Smith (1941) - Doctor (uncredited)
- Reap the Wild Wind (1942) - Devereaux Foreign Agent (uncredited)
- Crossroads (1942) - Professor (uncredited)
- Assignment in Brittany (1943) - Old Man at Inn (uncredited)
