= The Crucible (1914 film) =

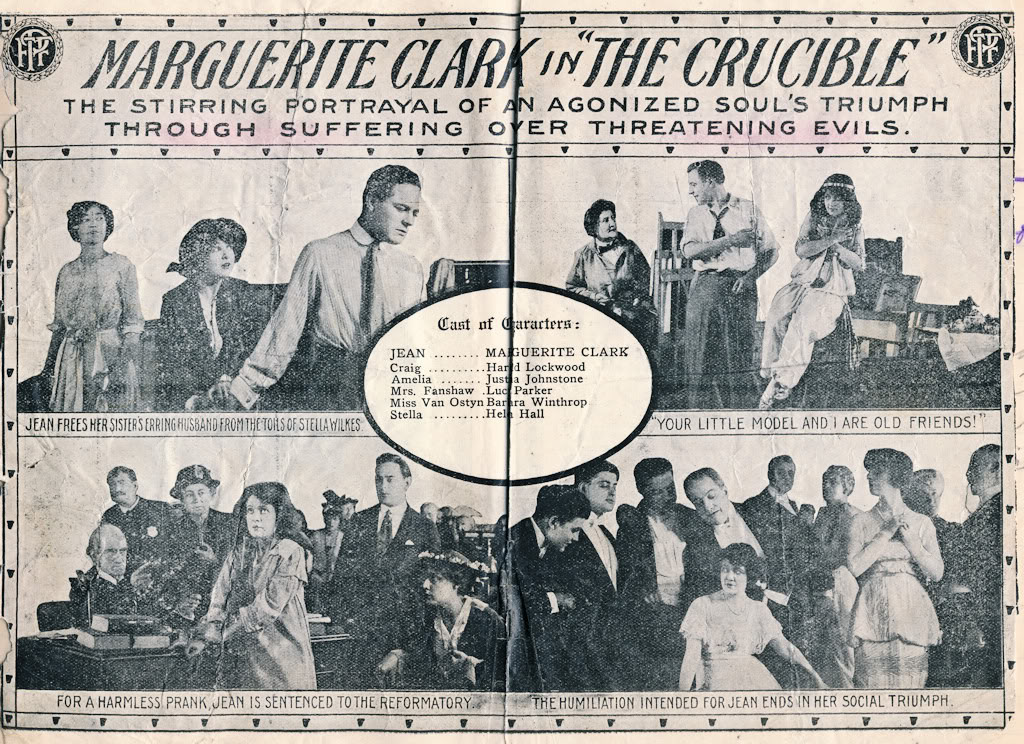
- Directed by: Edwin S. Porter; Hugh Ford
- Written by: Edwin S. Porter (uncredited); Hugh Ford (uncredited)
- Based on: The Crucible by Mark Lee Luther
- Starring: Marguerite Clark; Harold Lockwood
- Production company: Famous Players Film Company
- Distributed by: Paramount Pictures
- Release date: December 14, 1914
- Running time: 50 minutes
- Country: United States
- Languages: Silent; English intertitles

The Crucible is a 1914 American silent romantic drama film directed by Edwin S. Porter and Hugh Ford and released through Paramount Pictures. Based on a novel of the same name by Mark Lee Luther, the film stars Marguerite Clark and Harold Lockwood. The film is now presumed lost.

The film production does not relate to Arthur Miller's 1951 play, The Crucible.

== Plot ==
As described in a film magazine, Jean (Clark) is brought up as a boy by her father and, after Mr. Fenshaw dies, her boyish manner offends her mother and sisters. Jean is nagged and punished until one day she picks up a sickle and, without really intending to, cuts her sister's hand. She is sent to a reformatory. She later meets Craig Atwood (Lockwood), an artist in the woods, and goes through a series of trials to prove she is worthy of the love of her friend, the painter.

== Cast ==
- Marguerite Clark as Jean
- Harold Lockwood as Craig Atwood
- Justina Johnstone as Amelia
- Lucy Palmer as Mrs. Fanshaw
- Barbara Winthrop as Miss Van Ostyn
- Helen Hall as Stella Wilkes
- Blanche Fisher as Amy
- Clifford Grey as Harry
- Mrs. Mathilde Brundage

== See also ==
- Edwin S. Porter filmography
