= The Man Who Forgot (1917 film) =

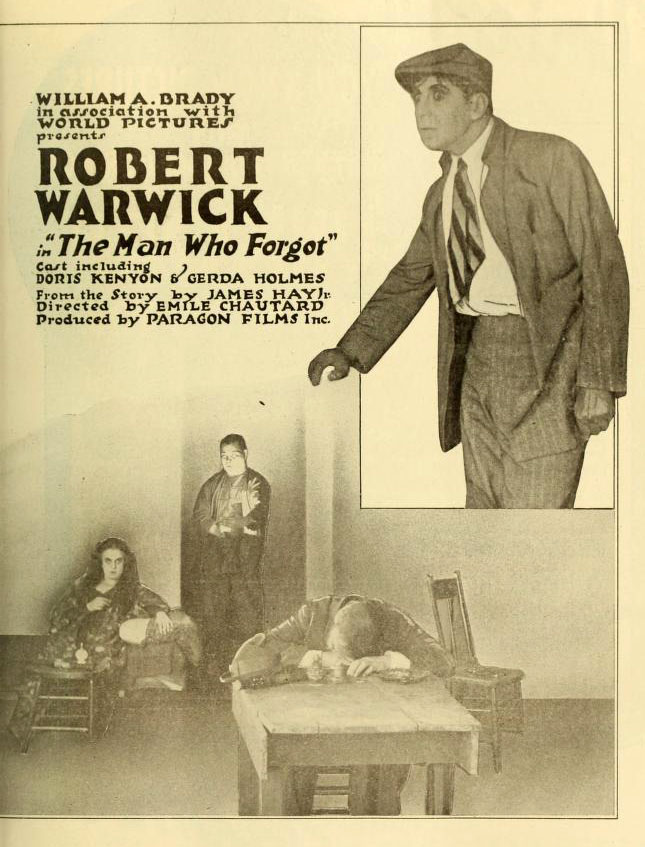
- Lobby poster
- Directed by: Emile Chautard; George Archainbaud (ass't director)
- Written by: James J. Hay
- Produced by: World Film; Paragon Films
- Starring: Robert Warwick
- Cinematography: Philip Hatkin; Lucien Tainguy
- Distributed by: World Film Company
- Release date: January 15, 1917
- Running time: 5 reels
- Country: United States
- Language: Silent (English intertitles)

The Man Who Forgot is a lost 1917 silent film directed by Emile Chautard and starring Robert Warwick. This movie is an adaptation of the book of the same name by James Hay.

== Cast ==
- Robert Warwick - The Man (aka John Smith)
- Doris Kenyon - Edith Mallon
- Gerda Holmes - The Woman, (or Mary Leslie
- Alex Shannon - Al Simpson (*billed Alex K. Shannon)
- Ralph Delmore - Senator Mallon
- John Reinhardt - Charles Waller
- Frederick Truesdell - Congressman Mannersley (*as Frederick C. Truesdell)

== Plot ==
An opium addict living in China decides to return home to the United States, only to become addicted to alcohol. He decides to stop drinking after forgetting his past and realizing what he has become. He changes his name to John Smith and starts fighting against liquor interests.
