= On the Spot (film) =

1940 film

- Theatrical release poster
- Directed by: Howard Bretherton
- Screenplay by: George Waggner; Dorothy Davenport
- Story by: George Waggner
- Produced by: Grant Withers
- Starring: Frankie Darro; Mary Kornman; Mantan Moreland; John St. Polis; Robert Warwick; Maxine Leslie
- Cinematography: Harry Neumann
- Edited by: Russell F. Schoengarth
- Music by: Edward J. Kay
- Production company: Monogram Pictures
- Distributed by: Monogram Pictures
- Release date: June 11, 1940
- Running time: 62 minutes
- Country: United States
- Language: English

On the Spot is a 1940 American comedy film directed by Howard Bretherton and written by George Waggner and Dorothy Davenport. The film stars Frankie Darro, Mary Kornman, Mantan Moreland, John St. Polis, Robert Warwick and Maxine Leslie. The film was released on June 11, 1940, by Monogram Pictures.

== Cast ==
- Frankie Darro as Frankie 'Doc' Kelly
- Mary Kornman as Ruth Hunter
- Mantan Moreland as Jefferson White
- John St. Polis as Doc Hunter
- Robert Warwick as Cyrus Haddon
- Maxine Leslie as Gerry Dailey
- Lillian Elliott as Mrs. Kelly
- LeRoy Mason as Smilin' Bill
- Gene O'Donnell as Slats Eckert
- Russell Hopton as Dave Nolan
- Jeffrey Sayre as Hype Innes
