= Julius Chambers =

American journalist

- Julius Chambers c. 1912
- Born: November 21, 1850; Bellefontaine, Ohio
- Died: February 12, 1920 (aged 69); New York, New York
- Occupations: Journalist, travel writer

Julius Chambers, F.R.G.S., (Note: There is disparity about an unused first name. The Americana Vol.4 (1911) calls him Charles Julius Chambers, Dictionary of American Biography (1936) and The Delta Kappa Epsilon Quarterly (1893) call him James Julius Chambers. Regardless of the correct name, he used neither one in practice, nor an initial in its place.) (November 21, 1850 – February 12, 1920) was an American author, editor, journalist, travel writer, and activist against psychiatric abuse.

== Life and works ==
Julius Chambers was born in Bellefontaine, Ohio on November 21, 1850, the son of Joseph and Sarabella (née Walker) Chambers. When he was only eleven years old, he began working as a printer's devil in his uncles' newspaper office, the Bellefontaine Republican. He first attended Ohio Wesleyan University, and later, Cornell University, from which he graduated in 1870. At Cornell, he was a co-founder in 1869 of the Irving Literary Society. Around 1880, while working as a journalist he spent some time reading law in Philadelphia with Benjamin H. Brewster, who became U.S. Attorney General in December 1881, and studying at Columbia College Law School in New York City.

=== New York Tribune ===
After graduating from Cornell, he became a reporter on the New York Tribune until 1873.

==== Geographic discovery ====
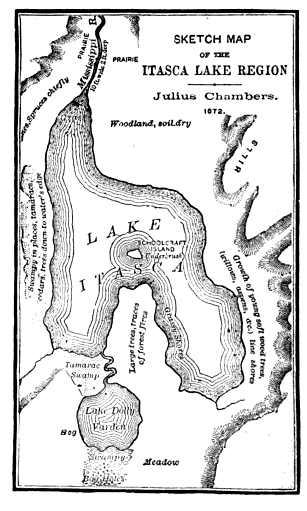
Crude map of Elk Lake region, drawn by Julius Chambers. He called the lake "Lake Dolly Varden", a Dickensian name he also gave to the canoe he used on the trip.

While on sick leave on June 4, 1872, Chambers discovered Elk Lake adjoining Lake Itasca in Clearwater County, Minnesota, in the Lake District of Northwestern Minnesota. He declared it to be the ultimate origin of the Mississippi River. (Note: Other white men including (William Morrison 1803, Schoolcraft 1832, and Nicollet 1836) preceded him there, but had not identified its role as such, because at the time of their visits, Elk Lake had been part of Lake Itasca, from which it was believed to have been subsequently separated by natural causes. (See reference "The Glazier Fiasco")) For this discovery, he was made a Fellow of the Royal Geographical Society. This led to a series of newspaper articles and the book The Mississippi River and Its Wonderful Valley (1910). (Note: The following notice appeared in the Brooklyn Daily Eagle on July 17, 1872: Julius Chambers, who undertook to paddle his canoe Dolly Varden from Lake Itaska to New Orleans, reached Quincy, Illinois, yesterday and shipped his canoe to St. Louis on the steamer Rob Roy.)

==== Investigative journalism ====
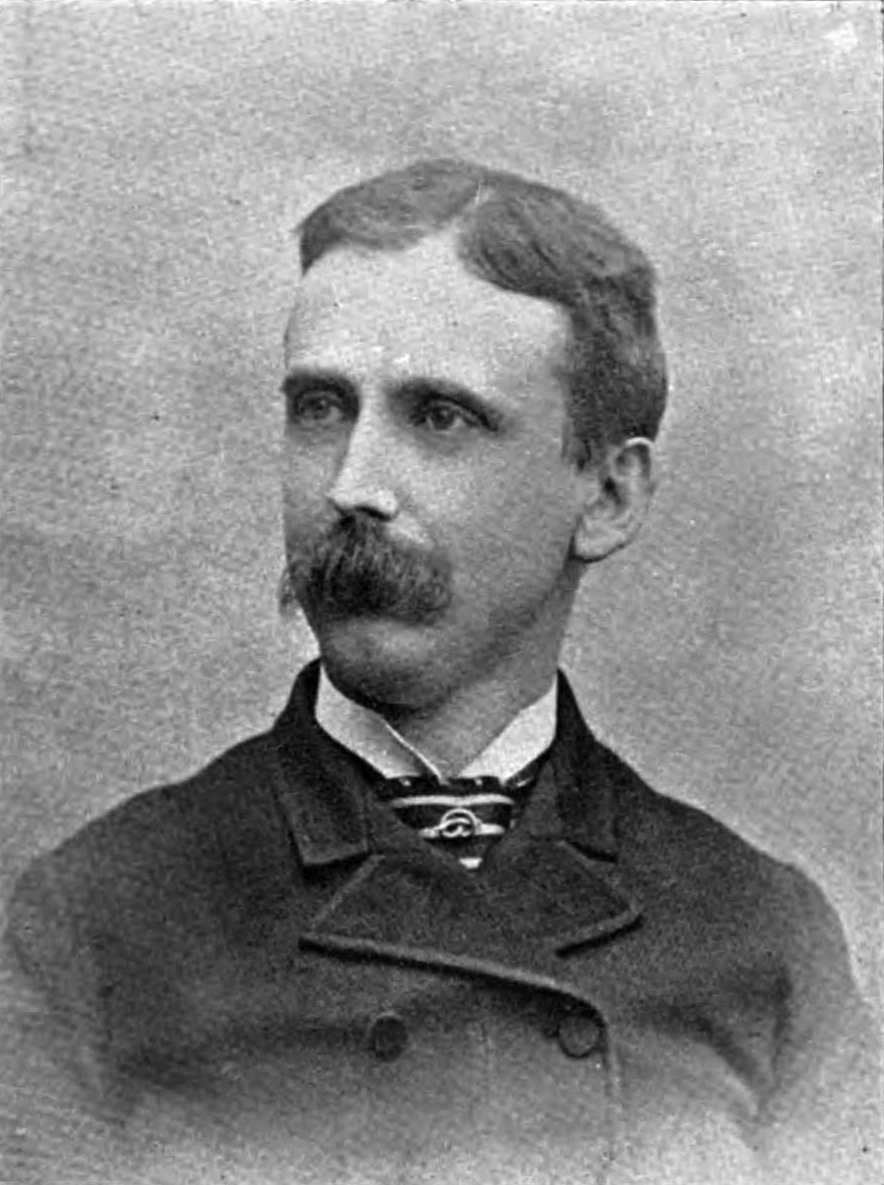
Julius Chambers in 1872

Later in 1872, he returned to work and undertook a journalistic investigation of Bloomingdale Asylum, having himself committed with the help of some of his friends and the city editor. His intent was to obtain information about alleged abuse of inmates. After ten days, his collaborators on the project had him released. When articles and accounts of the experience were published in the Tribune, it led to the release of twelve patients who were not mentally ill, a reorganization of the staff and administration of the institution and, eventually, to a change in the lunacy laws. (Note: The following notice appeared in the Brooklyn Daily Eagle on November 30, 1877: The lady whose suit against the Bloomingdale Asylum was mentioned in the Eagle on Wednesday is Mrs. James O. Norton. Mrs. Norton has been indefatigable for the past year to have her experiences of asylum life made known to the public, with a view toward ameliorating the condition of those suffering in them, and has decided that the course she has pursued is the best. She has put her case in the hands of Mr. John D. Townsend, of New York, whose name is associated with the exposures made several years ago by Julius Chambers, and he doubtless will secure a legal victory for this worthy lady) This later led to the publication of the book A Mad World and Its People (1876). From this time onward, Chambers was frequently invited to speak on the rights of the mentally ill and the need for proper facilities for their accommodation, care and treatment.

=== New York Herald ===
In 1873, he joined the staff of the New York Herald and in his fifteen years at the newspaper occupied nearly every one of its editorial desks. In 1887, his editor-in-chief sent him to Paris to launch the Paris Herald.

=== New York World ===
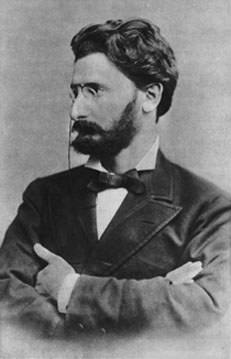
Chambers' editor-in-chief Joseph Pulitzer

In 1889, Chambers became the managing editor of the New York World on the invitation of Joseph Pulitzer, where he remained until 1891.

In 1890, Pulitzer, Chambers, et al. were indicted for posthumous criminal libel against Alexander T. Stewart for accusing him of "a dark and secret crime", as the man who "invited guests to meet his mistresses at his table", and as "a pirate of the dry goods ocean." The charges were dismissed by the court. This sort of criminal action was common at the time and both Pulitzer and Chambers were indicted in a number of cases, in some of which they were acquitted, in others convicted.

Chambers also wrote a column for the Brooklyn Daily Eagle, from 1904 onwards, called "Walks and Talks" and he continued to write it for the rest of his life.

He continued his travel writing and lectured in journalism at Cornell University from 1903 to 1904, and at New York University in 1910.

In addition to his works of non-fiction, he published over a hundred short stories and had two plays produced in New York, both comedies. His final book, the posthumously published News Hunting on Three Continents (1921), has been generally accepted as an autobiographical account of his career even though many of the chapters are in fact lightly revised versions of fictional stories he wrote over the years.

Chambers was married twice. For years he was a member of the Lotos Club, New York.

He died at his home in New York on February 12, 1920.

== Bibliography ==
=== Books ===
- A Mad World and Its People (1876) a.k.a.
  A Mad World and Its Inhabitants, Sampson Low, Marston, Searle, & Rivington, London
- On a Margin (1884) The story of a hopeless patriot, Ford, Howard & Hulbert, New York
- Lovers Four and Maidens Five (1886) A story of the Allegheny Mountains, Porter & Coates
- Missing (1896) A Romance of the Sargasso Sea, The Transatlantic Publishing Company
- A Happy Month in Jamaica (1900) F. Presbrey Co.
- The Destiny of Doris (1901) A travel-story of three continents, Continental Publishing Company, New York
- Seven, Seven, Seven – City (1903) A Tale of the Telephone
- When Money Talked (1904) Serialized in The Gateway: (Part 1) (Part 2)
- Seeing New York (1908) a brief historical guide and souvenir of America's greatest city
- The Book of New York (1912) Forty years' recollections of the American metropolis
- Montreal (1915) Old, New, Entertaining, Convincing, Fascinating (contributing editor)
- News Hunting on Three Continents (1921) Mitchell Kennerley, New York
- The Rascal Club (1897) F. Tennyson Neely, New York.
- Benjamin North
- One Woman's Life
- News hunting on three continents. Publisher: Mitchell Kennerley, New York 1921
- Works by or about Julius Chambers at the Internet Archive

=== Articles ===
- "The Chivalry of the Press" The Arena Vol.4 (June, 1891
- "Little Stories of Journalism" in The Reader (1904)
- "Woman:The Line of Progress" (1910) in The Forum, Volume 44
- "Why Germany Went to War, General Conversion to the Racial Doctrines of Professor Fichte" in The Gateway, a magazine of patriotic service, Volume XXXI (1918)
