= The Woman in the Case =

The Woman in the Case may refer to:

- The Woman in the Case (play), a 1905 play by Clyde Fitch
- The Woman in the Case (1916 American film), a 1916 American film based on Fitch's play
- The Woman in the Case (1916 Australian film), a 1916 Australian film based on Fitch's play
- The Headline Woman, a 1935 film titled The Woman in the Case in the United Kingdom
