= The Woman in the Case (1916 Australian film) =

- Directed by: George Willoughby
- Based on: play by Clyde Fitch
- Produced by: George Willoughby
- Starring: Jean Robertson
- Production company: Willoughby's Photo-plays
- Distributed by: Eureka Films
- Release dates: 2 May 1916 (preview); 3 July 1916
- Running time: 6,000 feet
- Country: Australia
- Languages: Silent film English intertitles

The Woman in the Case is a 1916 Australian silent film based on a popular play of the same name by Clyde Fitch.

It is considered a lost film.

== Plot ==
Julian Rolfe has an affair with Clare Foster as a young man, but then settles down to marriage with Margaret. Clare tries to blackmail Julian but Margaret destroys the letters. Clare murders Julian's ward, Phillip, and tries to frame Julian for it. Julian is sentenced to death but Margaret manages to get Clare to confess.

== Cast ==
- Jean Robertson as Margaret Rolfe
- Loris Bingham as Clare Foster
- Fred Knowles as Julian Rolfe
- Herbert J Bentley as Phillip Long
- Winter Hall
- David Edelsten
- Austin Milroy

== Production ==
George Willoughby had toured with the play though Australia in 1911 and 1912 to great success. Over 300 people were involved in making the movie.

Fred Knowles was an English actor touring Australia. After making the film he enlisted in the AIF and was wounded in France in May 1917, losing an arm. However he managed to resume his career.

Two other films were made from the same play, in 1916 and 1922 (as The Law and the Woman).

== Release ==
The movie was trade screened in May 1916.

Willoughby later revived the play in 1927.

It was announced that the Willoughby Company were then to make The Pearl of the Pacific based on a story by Randolph Bedford, but this film appears to have never been made.

== See also ==
- The Woman in the Case
