= Her Own Way (film) =

1915 film by Herbert Blaché

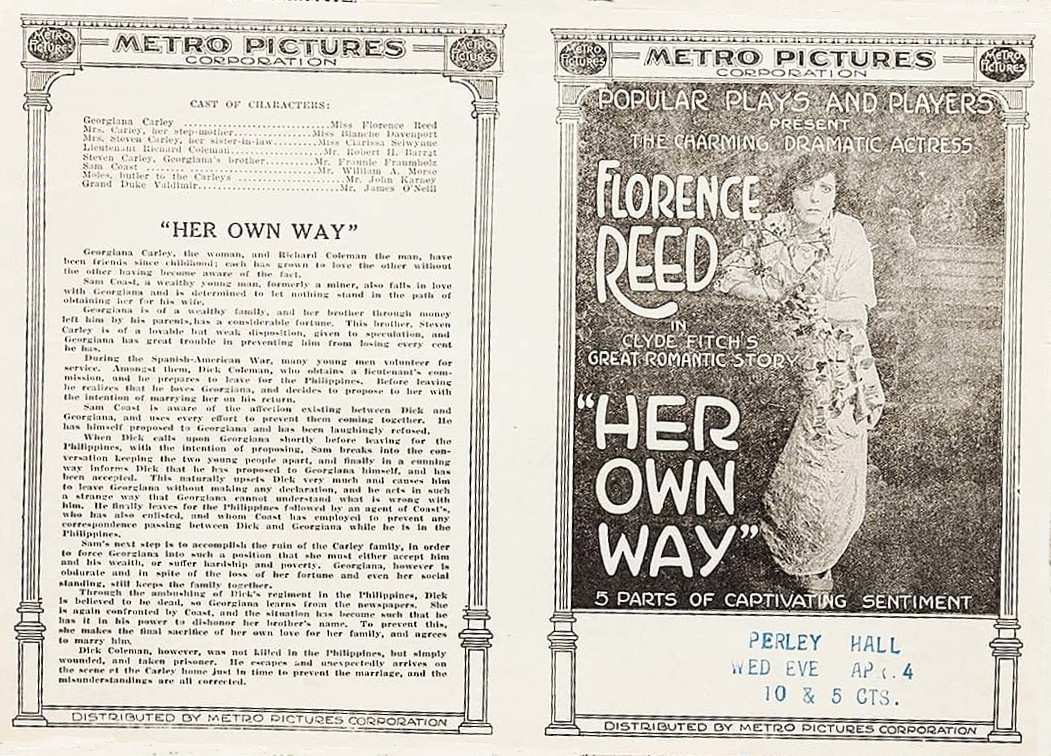
- Promotional flyer
- Directed by: Herbert Blaché
- Based on: Her Own Way by Clyde Fitch
- Starring: Florence Reed
- Production company: Popular Plays and Players
- Distributed by: Metro Pictures
- Release date: May 31, 1915
- Running time: 5 reels
- Country: USA
- Languages: Silent; English intertitles

Her Own Way is a lost 1915 American silent drama film directed by Herbert Blaché and starring Florence Reed. It is based on a 1903 Broadway play by Clyde Fitch that was a starring vehicle for Maxine Elliott. Part of the movie was filmed at the Isle of Palms, South Carolina.

== Cast ==
- Florence Reed - Georgiana Carley
- Blanche Davenport - Mrs. Carley
- Clarissa Selwynne - Mrs. Steven Carley
- Robert Barrat - Lt. Richard Coleman
- Fraunie Fraunholz - Steven Carley
- William A. Morse - Sam
- John Karney - Moles
- James O'Neill - Grand Duke Vladimir
