= The Wiser Sex =

1932 film

- Theatrical release poster
- Directed by: Berthold Viertel; Fred Zinnemann (assistant)
- Written by: Caroline Francke; Harry Hervey; Clyde Fitch (play)
- Starring: Claudette Colbert; Melvyn Douglas; Lilyan Tashman; Franchot Tone; William Boyd
- Cinematography: George J. Folsey
- Music by: Johnny Green
- Production company: Paramount Pictures
- Distributed by: Paramount Pictures
- Release date: March 15, 1932
- Running time: 72 minutes
- Country: United States
- Language: English

The Wiser Sex is a 1932 American pre-Code crime drama film directed by Berthold Viertel and Victor Viertel and starring Claudette Colbert, Melvyn Douglas, Lilyan Tashman, William "Stage" Boyd and Ross Alexander. Made by Paramount Pictures, its working title was The Weaker Sex.

Clyde Fitch's play was first filmed by Famous Players' in 1916 as The Woman in the Case, directed by Hugh Ford and starring Pauline Frederick. Famous Players–Lasky's 1922 production, The Law and the Woman, directed by Penrhyn Stanlaws and starring Betty Compson, was also based on Fitch's play.

It is the film debut of Franchot Tone and the final film of stage veteran Effie Shannon.

== Plot ==
After prosecutor David Rolfe has racketeer Benny Morgan arrested, mobster Harry Evans gives orders to his chauffeur to kill David, but the chauffeur fails.

The next day, David's fiancée, Margaret Hughes, leaves on a cruise with Jimmy O'Neill, her friendly suitor, warning David she will not marry a man for whom work is more important than she. David cannot give Margaret a proper bon voyage because he is trying to save his naïve young cousin, Phil Long, from the clutches of gold-digging moll Claire Foster, with whom David used to be involved.

When David warns Phil that Claire belongs to Evans, Phil takes David's revolver with him to Claire's hotel to confront her. Evans enters in his housecoat and Phil shoots him in the arm. They struggle and Phil is killed. When David arrives, Claire, on Evans' orders, says Phil killed himself, then calls the police and frames David as the killer.

In court, David's defense is greatly weakened by Claire's acting ability, and she successfully seduces the all-male jury. Margaret returns for the trial and remarks that a jury of the "wiser sex" would see right through Claire's histrionics. In order to gather evidence, Margaret goes undercover as blonde gold digger Ruby Kennedy and takes a room adjacent to Claire's.

Through diamonds and liquor, Margaret befriends Claire and wheedles her into revealing more about the case. Jimmy and Margaret throw a party for Claire and Evans, and Evans makes several passes at Margaret. During the party, Evans' cook, Fritz, who helped him with his wound the morning of the murder, accidentally bumps Evans' arm and Evans scolds him for calling attention to it.

The next day, Fritz is found dead, and Margaret now knows the missing bullet from David's gun is lodged in Evans. Margaret then meets Evans for a rendezvous, while Jimmy tells Claire he has lost her to Evans. As Evans' chauffeur identifies Margaret, Claire enters in a jealous rage and reveals Evans as Phil's murderer. Due to the sleuthing abilities of the "wiser sex," David is released and marries Margaret.

== Cast ==
- Claudette Colbert as Margaret Hughes, a.k.a. Ruby Kennedy
- Melvyn Douglas as District Attorney David Rolfe
- Lilyan Tashman as Claire Foster
- William 'Stage' Boyd as Harry Evans
- Ross Alexander as Jimmy O'Neill
- Franchot Tone as Phil Long
- Effie Shannon as Mrs. Hughes
- Paul Harvey as Blaney
- Victor Kilian as Ed
- Douglass Dumbrille as the chauffeur

== Production ==
Ended mid-Feb 1932 at Paramount-Publix New York Studios (Astoria, Long Island).
