= Henry Brose =

Australian physicist

Henry L. Brose
- Born: Henry Herman Leopold Adolph Bröse; 15 September 1890
- Died: 4 February 1965 (aged 74)
- Scientific career
- Fields: Physics
- Workplaces: University of Nottingham, University of Sydney
- Thesis: The motion of electrons in oxygen (1925)
- Doctoral advisor: John Sealy Edward Townsend

Signature
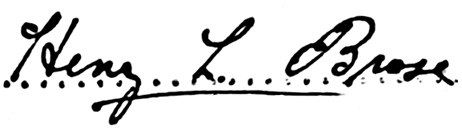

Henry Herman Leopold Adolph Brose (15 September 1890 – 24 February 1965) was an Australian physicist and translator. During the First World War, he was interned as a civilian prisoner in Germany. He was the first Australian to be awarded a PhD from the University of Oxford. Brose held the Lancaster-Spencer Chair of Physics at the University of Nottingham from 1931 to 1935, and he translated a number of key physics texts from German into English. His translations of crucial German texts on Einstein's theory of General Relativity have been essential for the theory's reception in the English-speaking world. In 1935, Brose moved to Australia where he engaged in cancer research. During the Second World War, suspected of sympathy with the Nazi regime, he was interned in Australia from 1940 to 1943, which ended his academic career.

== Life ==
Born in Adelaide, Brose attended Prince Alfred College and graduated from the University of Adelaide in 1910 with a B.Sc. in mathematics. A member of the Adelaide University Athletics Club, Brose was awarded a University Blue for Athletics in 1910. In 1911-12 he taught French at Prince Alfred College, and in 1913 was awarded the Rhodes Scholarship for South Australia. Brose went up to Christ Church, Oxford to study mathematics.

=== Ruhleben Internment Camp ===
While visiting relatives in Hamburg in 1914, he was arrested by the German authorities and interned at Ruhleben, outside Berlin, as a civilian prisoner for the duration of the First World War. During his captivity Brose became interested in Einstein's Theory of Relativity, realised its significance and, while he was still at Ruhleben, started translating two books on General Relativity that had just recently appeared: philosopher Moritz Schlick's Space and Time in Contemporary Physics and astronomer Erwin Freundlich's The foundations of Einstein's Theory of Gravitation.

Brose also participated in educational activities organised by Ruhleben internees. Scholars from different fields used to give lectures in the camp, organised in the open air. Brose lectured on the dynamics of particles, hydrodynamics, and differential and integral calculus.

By 1917, conditions in the camp had increasingly exhausted his constitution. Brose was suffering from serious health problems. Help was provided from outside: a German business man, whom he knew from Adelaide, arranged a meeting with the Hamburg Consul Arnold Gumprecht, in whose house Brose was finally allowed to spend the last year of the war, on 'release on parole' and tutoring the consul's children in English. There, his health recovered, and he dedicated his spare time to studies and translations.

=== Oxford 1919-1925 ===
In spring 1919, Brose returned to Oxford. In June of the same year, he was awarded simultaneous B.A. and M.A. degrees, following special decrees. He went on to do research on spectrophotometry at the Clarendon Laboratory, headed by Frederick Alexander Lindemann who also agreed to supervise Brose's doctoral work entitled 'A critical study of the development of the theory of relativity'. During the war, contacts between the scientific communities of the belligerent countries had broken down; as a consequence, not more than a handful of English physicists had so far even heard about Einstein's gravitational theory. Lindemann was delighted with Brose's knowledge and arranged for him to give a lecture on General Relativity to the Science Colloquium at the Clarendon. Encouraged by the physiologist John Scott Haldane (who had been in the audience), Brose went on to publish his lecture by the title: The Theory of Relativity: An Introductory Sketch based on Einstein's Original Writings (Blackwell, Oxford 1919).

Ever since his return to England, Brose had tried hard to publish his translations of Erwin Freundlich's and Moritz Schlick's texts. But wartime memories were still vivid, and relations between the scholarly communities of the formerly belligerent countries were strained. In a first attempt - and despite the support of such renowned scientists as Lindemann, Arthur Stanley Eddington, and the Oxford astronomer Herbert Hall Turner - Brose was unable to find a publisher willing to publish a German scientist's text. This changed in November 1919, when the results of the Eddington experiment were made public, confirming Einstein's Theory of General Relativity.

==== General Relativity in the English-speaking world: Brose's translations ====
During the war, the Cambridge astronomer Arthur Stanley Eddington had learned about Einstein's new theory through the Dutch physicist Willem de Sitter. Together with Frank Watson Dyson, he had mounted expeditions for putting one of its predictions - the deflection of light in a gravitational field - to the test, on the occasion of the eclipse of May 1919. The famous official statement was at the joint meeting of the Astronomical Society and Royal Society at Burlington House on November 6, 1919. Brose attended the meeting as Turner’s guest, Lindemann was one of the speakers. The announcement led to intensive press coverage in England and the US and provoked an enormous public interest. At this time, popular books on the new theory were badly needed.

No less than six Brose-translations on General Relativity were put into the hands of English readers between 1920 and 1924: Freundlich’s The foundations of Einstein's Theory of Gravitation appeared in March 1920, Moritz Schlick's Space and Time in Contemporary Physics in April 1920, Alexander Moszkowski’s Einstein the searcher: his work explained from dialogues with Einstein in 1921, Hermann Weyl's Space, Time, Matter in 1922, and finally, in 1924, Erwin Freundlich's The Theory of Relativity: Three Lectures for Chemists and Max Born's Einstein's Theory of Relativity.

Brose's own small pamphlet The Theory of Relativity: An Introductory Sketch based on Einstein's Original Writings, first published by Blackwell in November 1919, was published in five editions in only four months. It was later reprinted as an essay in the second and third edition of Freundlich’s book The foundations of Einstein's Theory of Gravitation.

In addition to his works on General Relativity, Brose published his translations of Fritz Reiche's The Quantum Theory in 1922 (translated together with the chemist and inventor H.S.Hatfield whom he knew from Ruhleben camp), and of Arnold Sommerfeld's Atomic Structure and Spectral Lines in 1923.

==== Doctoral thesis ====
Despite his intense translational work on the theory of relativity and quantum physics, Brose's own interests as a physicist turned out to be more of the experimentalist kind. Already in 1921, he had changed the subject of his doctoral thesis, now focussing on spectroscopy. In 1925 he completed a PhD on the motion of electrons in oxygen, under the supervision of John Sealy Edward Townsend. In doing so, he became the first Australian to earn a PhD (there called a D. Phil.) from Oxford.

=== Nottingham 1926-1935 ===
Brose was appointed to a permanent position at the University of Nottingham in 1926 and to the Lancaster-Spencer Chair of Physics in 1931.

John Jenkin relates:

′Physics prospered under his leadership. He supervised a number of PhD students, gave regular lectures, and arranged for a number of notable scientists to visit Nottingham, including Sommerfeld, Freundlich, Townsend, C.D. Ellis, Lawrence Bragg and Hatfield.′

It was also thanks to Brose’s untiring efforts that, on 21st June 1930, Einstein finally appeared in person at Nottingham University, where he gave a talk on 'Space and Matter’ in which he outlined his ideas on a unified field theory.

From 1926 to 1933, Brose translated a series of more physics texts from German into English, most importantly Wave Mechanics by Arnold Sommerfeld (1930), The Elements of the New Quantum Mechanics by Otto Halpern & Hans Thirring (1932), and five volumes of Max Planck's Introduction to Theoretical Physics (1932/33).

The importance of these translations cannot be overstated. Brose's contributions to the introduction and dissemination of crucial German works of modern physics in Britain have been essential for the scientific and intellectual discourse of their time. The vast collection of his original manuscripts and numerous scientific papers is archived at the University of Adelaide.

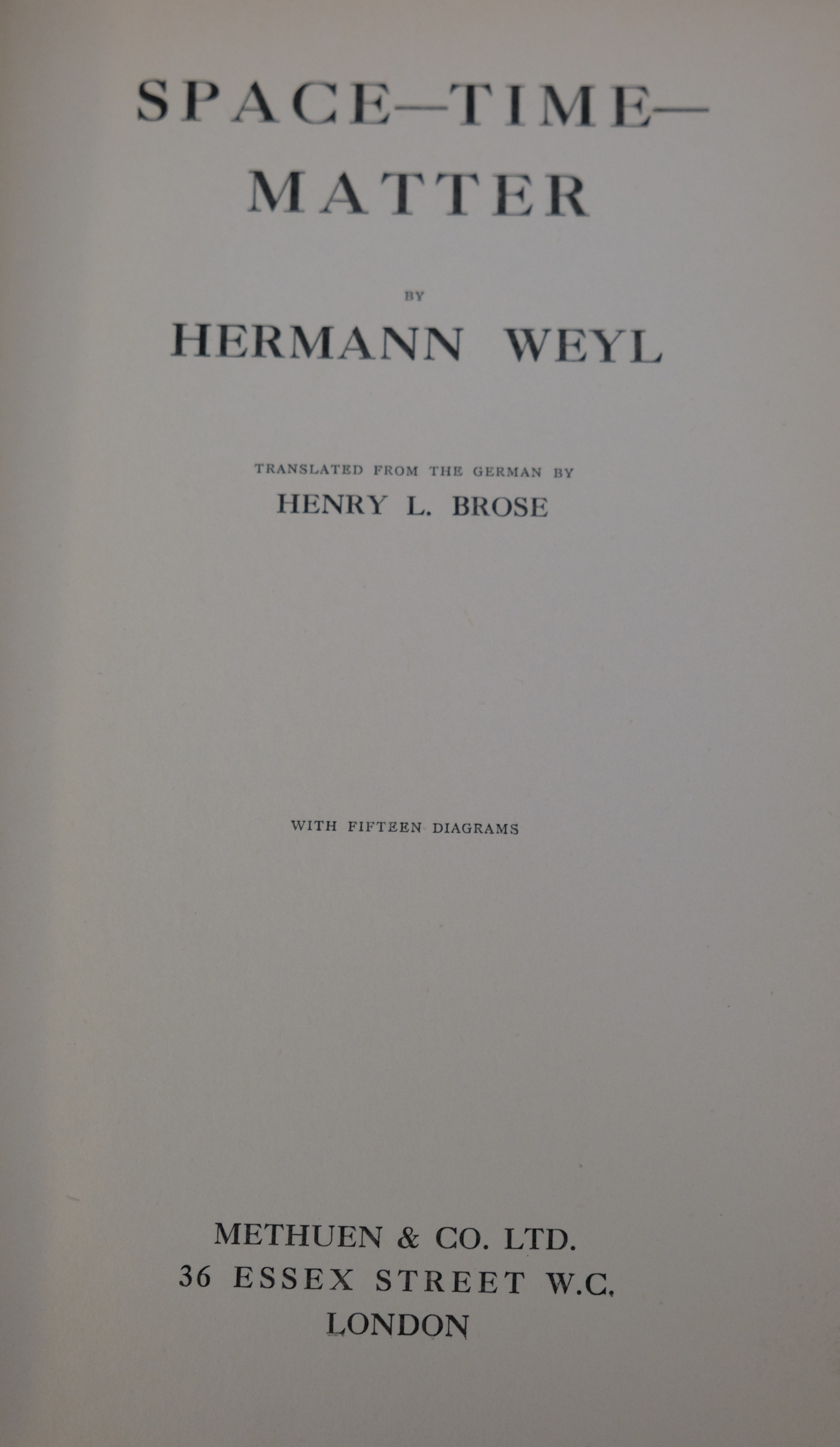
Space, Time, Matter by Hermann Weyl (English, 1922: translated from German by Brose)

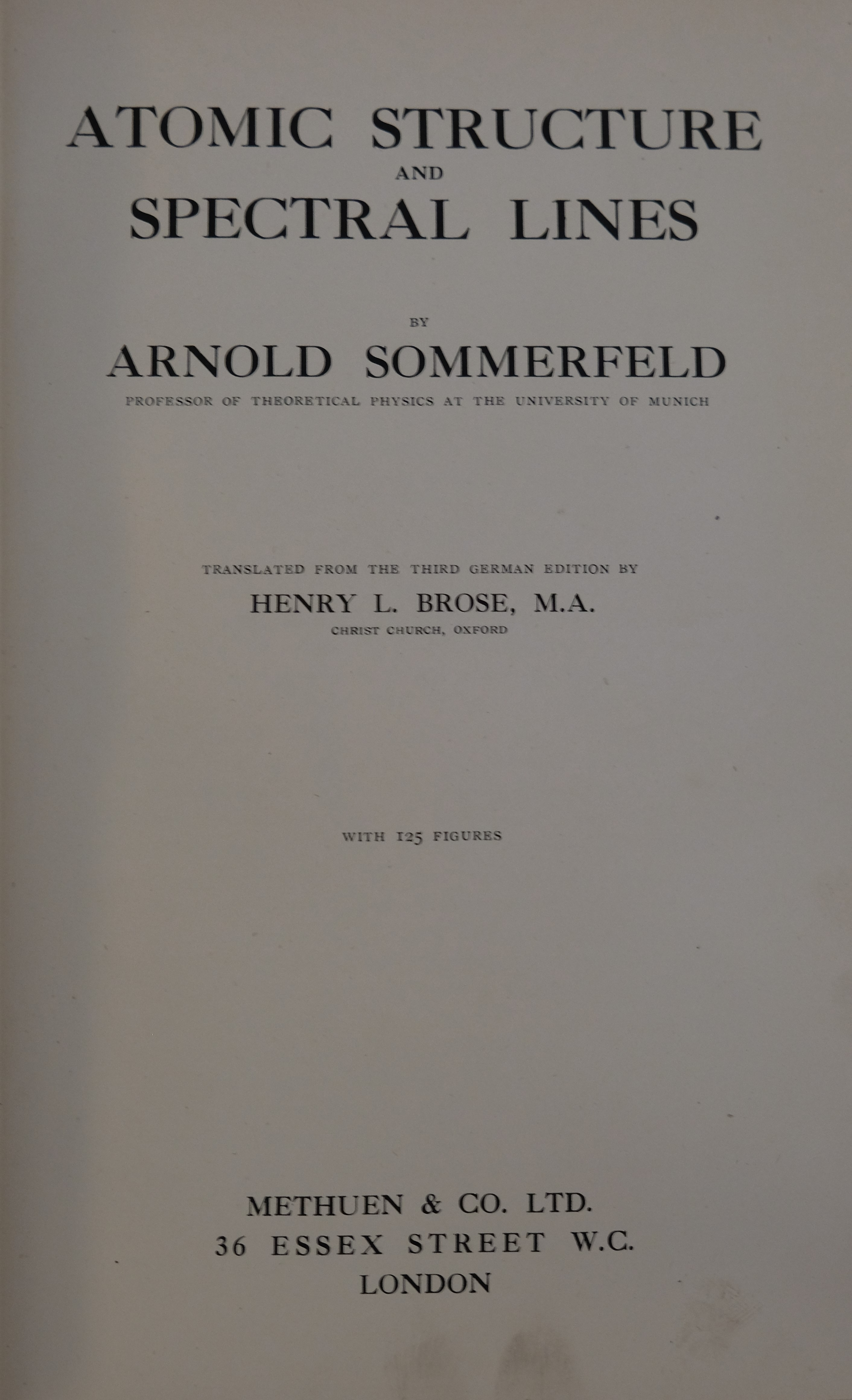
Title page to Arnold Sommerfeld's Atomic Structure and Spectral Lines (1923), translated by Brose

On the occasion of Einstein's visit to the University of Nottingham in 1930, Brose borrowed a Rolls-Royce to drive Einstein from Cambridge where he had received an Honorary degree. The two of them drove to Woolsthorpe and visited Newton’s birthplace. Einstein spent two days with Brose and his family in Nottingham. In two letters of the same year, he finds warm words for both his memories of the visit and their personal acquaintance. Brose also acted as an interpreter during Einstein's visits of 1930 and 1931.

At Nottingham University, Brose was undoubtedly at the high pont of his academic career. But, as John Jenkin relates:

‘...now storm clouds gathered. A relationship developed between the wife of a local clergyman and Henry Brose, the details of which remain unclear. There was a very public divorce case in July 1935, the College was upset that a high-profile member of its staff was involved, and Brose resigned his chair in October.’

== Return to Australia ==
While holidaying in Australia in 1935, Brose was offered a well-paid position as a researcher on the University of Sydney's Cancer Research Committee. This was despite Brose's experience as a physicist and not a biologist. At the same time, he had learned of the scandal caused when he was named as co-respondent in the divorce of the above-mentioned Nottingham clergyman and his wife. He accepted the position and his wife and son moved with him to Chatswood.

His work for the committee had a promising beginning. Brose suggested a possible diagnostic test for cancer that involved measuring the phosphorus content of the blood. Nowadays it is known that chemical blood tests cannot diagnose cancer, but at the time, Brose performed well, his findings were published in numerous papers, and he also developed simplified methods for comparing the intensity of medical x-rays.

But after producing lackluster results, the Cancer Research Committee was disbanded in 1938, and much of the value of Brose's work was lost by his unwise reaction to this closure.

In the same year, acting head of the Department of Medicine, Victor Trikojus, who objected to Brose working as a pathologist when he had no training in pathology, had told Brose he no longer considered him part of the Department of Medicine. Brose moved offices from the medical building to Challis House. And in reaction to the closure of the committee, he sent a scathing letter to the Vice-Chancellor, criticising a number of his colleagues and stating that the Cancer Research Committee had failed in its research due to mismanagement, rivalries, and underperforming academics. The university ordered him to vacate his new office in 1939.

=== Internment in Australia ===
On September 1, 1939, Nazi-Germany invaded Poland, World War II broke out. It was a time of heightened political tension. Brose had never made a secret of his ties to Germany, and he still had numerous German friends and acquaintances. In September 1940, he was arrested under national security regulations and imprisoned. A number of his former colleagues had made statements to the police suggesting that he was sympathetic to Nazism. Despite a tribunal the following month finding no evidence of disloyalty, it stated that Brose was;

a thoroughly unscrupulous person, and quite devoid of moral or ethical inhibitions. Moreover he is possessed of marked energy and mental capacity and in need of money...given the opportunity, he could undoubtedly be a great potential danger to this country

Although many submissions were made in Brose's favor, he remained interned at Orange until late 1943, when he was allowed to work as a labourer in Terrigal. He was allowed to return to Sydney in 1944. Throughout this whole period, his wife, Australian actress Jean Robertson, supported him loyally. Having lost the support of his university and colleagues, and embittered by his second experience of captivity, Brose never again worked in scientific research. He died on 24 February 1965 and was survived by his wife and son.
