= The Truth (play) =

1907 play by Clyde Fitch

The Truth is a play in four acts by Clyde Fitch. It opened January 7, 1907, at the Criterion Theatre. Despite closing after a short run to only small audiences, the play was one of only a few Fitch plays to be universally praised by critics.

The Truth was an international success, triumphing in France, England, Italy, Russia, Hungary, Norway, Sweden, Denmark, and more. The play's set was realistic, three-dimensional, and intricately detailed in the manner typical to a Fitch play. Louis XIV chairs and a real telephone are just a few of the elements that stand out in production photographs.

The play's initial failure in the US was likely due to poor casting, as the revival, which was identical in everything but the cast, was a huge success in New York. The leading roles were difficult and complex, benefitting from skillful and subtle actors. The failure of the play in the US compared to its success with different casts abroad may have resulted in the suicide of the American leading lady, Clara Bloodgood.

== Synopsis ==
Eve Lindon is a 1903 society matron who suspects her husband, Fred, of having an affair with her good friend Becky Warder. She hires a private detective to follow him around and finds out that Becky and Fred have seen each other almost every day. Eve Lindon goes to Becky Warder's house to confront Becky, but Becky lies about seeing Fred so often. Eve announces her fears to Tom Warder, who vehemently disbelieves Eve's claims. He doesn't believe his wife would ever lie to him. The situation is complicated by Becky's view of reality, that she can lie whenever and however she wants. Becky has told so many lies that her claims that she hasn't been meeting with Fred daily begin to sound suspicious to Tom.
