= The Woman in the Case (1916 American film) =

1916 film directed by Hugh Ford

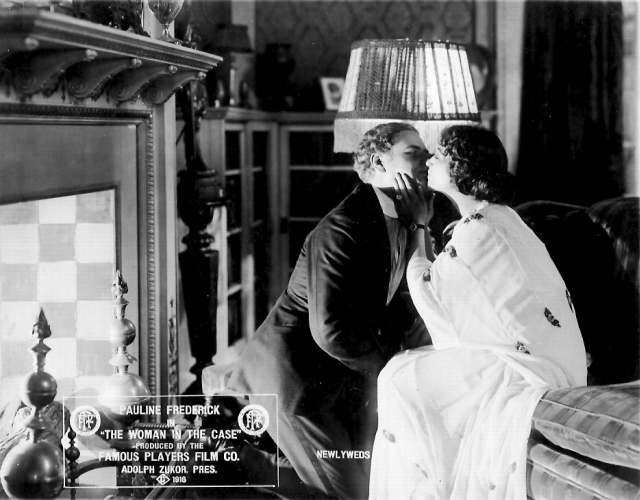
- Film still of Alan Hale and Pauline Frederick
- Directed by: Hugh Ford; Martyn Keith (ass't director)
- Written by: Doty Hobart (adaptation)
- Based on: The Woman in the Case by Clyde Fitch
- Produced by: Adolph Zukor
- Starring: Pauline Frederick; Alan Hale
- Cinematography: Ned Van Buren
- Distributed by: Paramount Pictures
- Release date: August 6, 1916
- Running time: 50 minutes
- Country: United States
- Language: Silent (English intertitles)

The Woman in the Case is a 1916 American silent drama film produced by the Famous Players Film Company and distributed through Paramount Pictures. Hugh Ford directed star Pauline Frederick as Margaret Rolfe. Clyde Fitch's 1905 play of the same name is the source material for this production and on Broadway the Margaret Rolfe role was played by Blanche Walsh. An Australian film of the same name based on Fitch's play was also produced in 1916 and is now lost.

Filmed again by Paramount in 1922 as The Law and the Woman with Betty Compson and as a talkie in 1932 as The Wiser Sex.

== Cast ==
- Pauline Frederick - Margaret Rolfe
- Marie Chambers - Claire Foster
- Alan Hale - Julian Rolfe
- Paul Gordon - Philip Long
- George Larkin - ?
- Clarence Handyside - ?
- Mrs. C. Pettengill - ?

== Preservation ==
Sources conflict on the survival status of The Woman in the Case. The Library of Congress listed the film as presumed lost in 2017. In February of 2021, the film was cited by the National Film Preservation Board on their Lost U.S. Silent Feature Films list. As of 2012, the Pauline Frederick website suggests that an incomplete, unpreserved nitrate print of the film survives at EYE Filmmuseum. That print includes the first four reels but is missing the fifth. The Filmmuseum's Eye Catalogus confirms this as of 2026.
