= Émilienne Moreau-Evrard =

French World War I resistance member

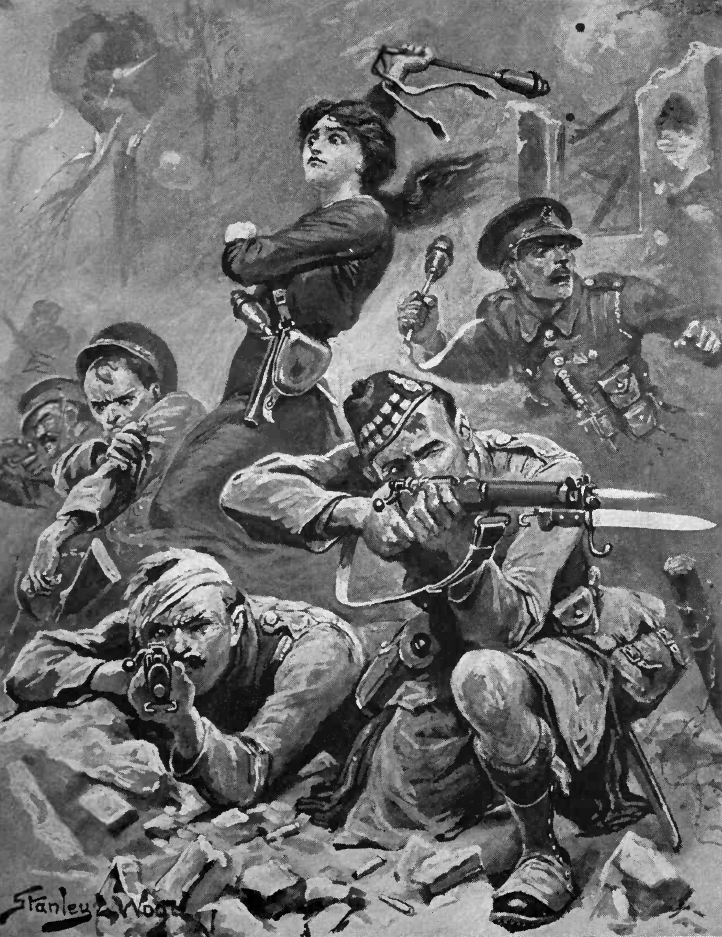
- Émilienne Moreau-Evrard French heroine of WWI painted by Stanley L Wood
- Born: 4 June 1898; Wingles, in the Pas-de-Calais département.
- Died: 5 January 1971 (aged 72); Lens, in the Pas-de-Calais département.
- Known for: French heroine of World War I, a high-profile female member of the “Brutus” Resistance network during World War II

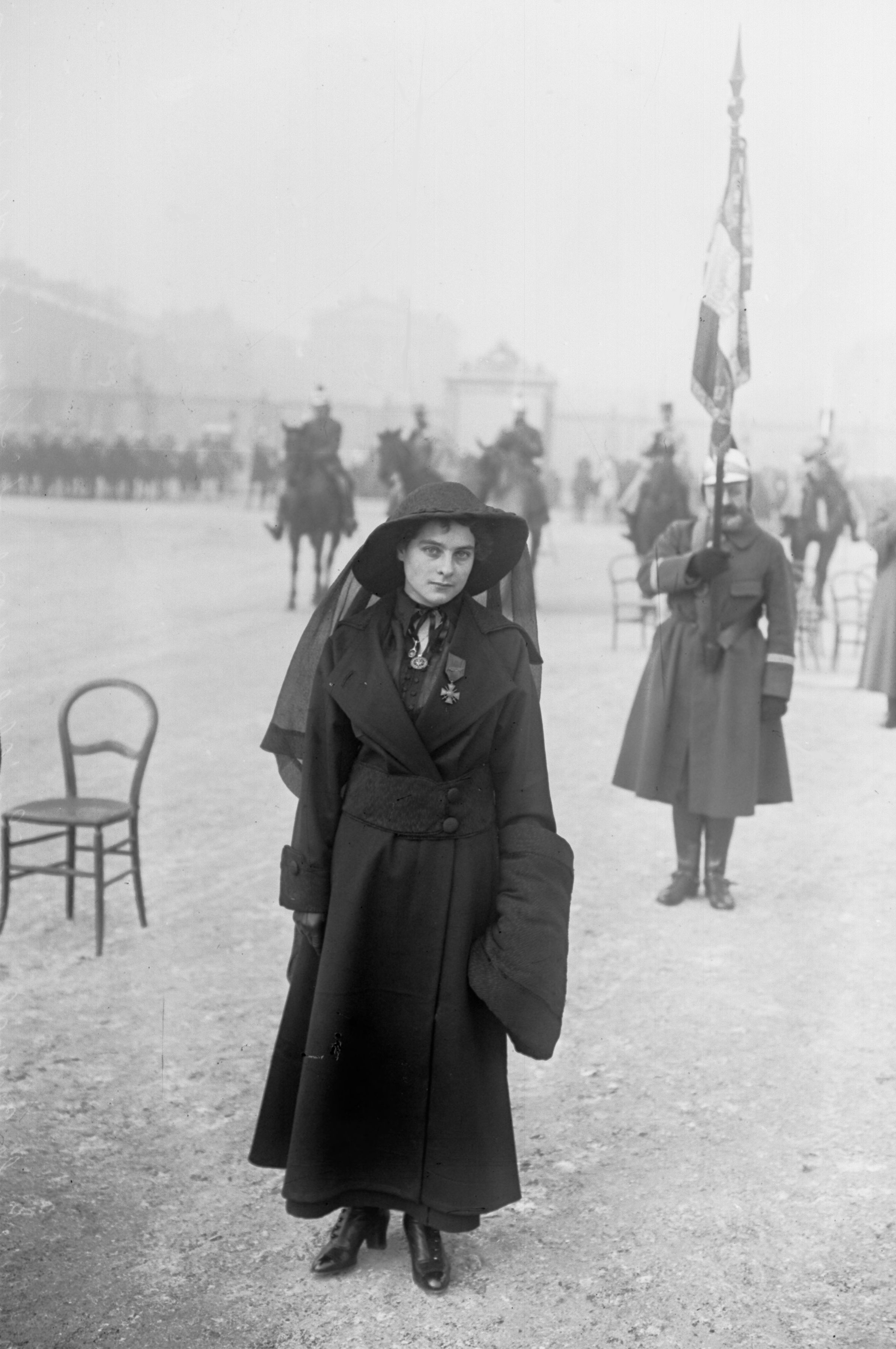
Émilienne Moreau wearing the Croix de guerre in Versailles, 27 November 1915

Émilienne Moreau-Evrard (French pronunciation: [emiljɛn mɔʁo evʁaʁ]; 4 June 1898 – 5 January 1971) was a French heroine of World War I, a high-profile female member of the "Brutus" Resistance network during World War II and later, a member of the Provisional Consultative Assembly. Moreover, she is one of only six women recipients of the Ordre de la Libération.

== Life ==
Émilienne Moreau was born on 4 June 1898 at Wingles, in the Pas-de-Calais département.

Shortly before the Germans invaded France in August 1914, her father Henri, a recently retired coal mining foreman, opened a grocery store in Loos, close to Lens. Émilienne, then 16 years old, was studying for her teacher's certification.

== World War I ==
Émilienne Moreau witnessed the German invasion and the subsequent takeover of Loos. The French tried to take back the town but gave up in October 1914. After her father was arrested by the Germans for violating their strict curfew, Émilienne managed to get him released, but he died in December.

In February 1915, she created an improvised school for the local children in an abandoned house.

On 25 September 1915, Scottish soldiers of the Black Watch counter-attacked her village. Émilienne, only 17 years old, met with them to give soldiers the precise location of the Germans' position in a small, impregnable fort. Thanks to this information the Scottish soldiers were able to avoid the fort, which reduced the German effectiveness in this area of the battlefield and resulted in only a few casualties. Further to this attack, Émilienne organised a first aid post in her house, with the help of a Scottish doctor, to take care of the wounded.

As the Germans tried to retake the village, Émilienne saved a British soldier who was under fire. With the help of some wounded British soldiers, she threw grenades into the cellar of a neighboring house and killed the German soldiers who were hiding there. She later also shot two German soldiers. Eventually the village came under the sole control of the Allies.

After being evacuated, she was awarded the Croix de guerre with an army acknowledgement given directly by Marshal Ferdinand Foch, as well as the Croix du Combattant, given by the French Army.

She was also recognised by the British Army, who awarded her the Military Medal, the Royal Red Cross (first class), and the Venerable Order of Saint John. The Venerable Order of Saint John has only rarely been given to a woman.

Émilienne was personally invited to meet the President of the French Republic Raymond Poincaré, as well as the King of the United Kingdom, King George V.

The French newspaper Le Petit Parisien wrote about her exploits in detail, which made her a national hero. The army and the press used her image, along with descriptions comparing her to Joan of Arc to improve the morale of both civilians and soldiers.

An Australian-made movie entitled The Joan of Arc of Loos (1916) also recounted her accomplishments, but it received much criticism for the title's use of such a revered name.

After she graduated, she ended the war with a teaching position in a boys' school in Paris.

After the war had ended, she returned to Pas-de-Calais in the north of France, where she married socialist activist Just Evrard in 1932. In 1934 she was appointed as the General Secretary of the Women's Socialist Movement, in Pas-de-Calais.

== World War II ==
When World War II was declared, Émilienne was living with her husband, Just Evrard, and their two children, Raoul and Roger, in the French commune of Lens. They fled from the war zone, as did many others in northern France, but after the French Armistice she and her family returned to Lens.

Émilienne, who was famous for her former military actions during World War I, was placed under house arrest in Lillers. She was, however, eventually permitted to return home to Lens, where she started to distribute propaganda brochures against Marshal Philippe Pétain and his capitulation. She also made contact with the British Intelligence Service, providing them with crucial information. At the end of 1940, Emillienne and her husband created a secret section within the socialist party in Lens.

Émilienne Moreau is known in the French resistance under two names: “Jeanne Poirier” and “Émilienne la Blonde”. She was in charge of linking “Brutus” in Switzerland with the French Comité d'action socialiste, known as CAS (in English: Socialist Action Committee), combining this with specific missions in Paris.

She then joined the French Resistance movement named the “France au Combat” (in English: “The Fighting France”), which was founded in 1943 by André Boyer. While there she worked with other famous resistance members, such as Augustin Laurent, André Le Troquer, and Pierre Lambert.

In March 1944, in Lyon, she was almost arrested following the case of the “85 de l’Avenue de Saxe”. During this incident, seventeen of her friends in the resistance network were arrested by the Gestapo. Two months later, while still in Lyon, she escaped again from further series of raids carried out by the Gestapo. In one of these raids, Nazi soldiers waited for her near her house, and upon seeing her fired in her direction, but missed. She quickly escaped by using a basement in the neighbourhood.

While the Germans attempted to capture Émilienne she tried several times to escape to England, finally succeeding on 7 August 1944. However, she returned to France soon after, in September 1944, to sit on the “Assemblée consultative provisoire” (in English: Provisional Consultative Assembly), where she embodied the French female way.

For her work in the French resistance Émilienne was awarded the rare Compagnon de la Libération, also known as the Ordre de la Libération, which is second in France only to the Legion of Honour. She was awarded in August 1945 by Général Charles de Gaulle, in Béthune. She was one of only six women given the award, and one of only two women to receive it whilst still alive.

After World War II ended, Émilienne became a politician, joining the French Socialist Party.

Émilienne Moreau-Evrard died on 5 January 1971, aged 72 years old, and was buried in Lens, France.

=== Honours ===
- Officer of the Légion d'honneur
- Compagnon de la Libération - legislative bill of August 11, 1945
- Croix de guerre 1939-1945
- Croix de guerre 1914-1918 with one palm
- Croix du combattant
- Croix du combattant volontaire de la Résistance
- Military Medal
- Royal Red Cross
- Officer of the Venerable Order of Saint John

== Bibliography ==
Notes

References

- Fell, Alison S. (2018). Women as Veterans in Britain and France after the First World War. Cambridge University Press. ISBN 9781108425766. - Total pages: 224
- ordredelaliberation.fr (2020). "Émilienne Moreau-Evrard". ordredelaliberation.fr.
- "French diplomats use heroine who helped Black Watch to strengthen Auld Alliance". The Scotsman. November 25, 2017. ISSN 0307-5850. OCLC 614655655.
