= The Woman in the Case (play) =

Play by Clyde Fitch

- Original language: English
- Written by: Clyde Fitch
- Genre: Drama

Premiere
- Date: January 31, 1905
- Place: Herald Square Theatre

The Woman in the Case is a play written by Clyde Fitch. The producing duo of Wagenhals and Colin Kemper opened it on Broadway at the Herald Square Theatre on January 31, 1905. Blanche Walsh starred as Margaret Rolfe, while Robert Drouet played Julian Rolfe.

== Synopsis ==
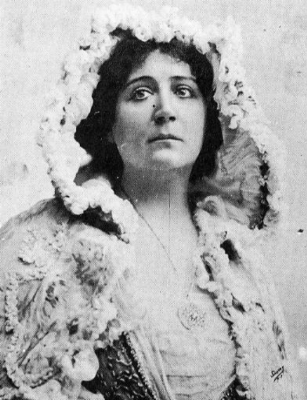
Blanche Walsh starred in the Broadway production.

Margaret has been married to Julian but three months when Julian is arrested for the murder of his best friend, Philip Long. It had previously been thought that Long had committed suicide, but his family refused to accept such a gruesome idea. Just prior to the arrest, newspaper reports told of the discovery of love letters from Julian to Claire Foster, whom Long was planning to marry. The implication is that Julian must have killed Long in a fit of jealousy. Julian, however, is known by all as a man of uncommon integrity. Margaret never questions his innocence; she decides to disguise herself as a member of the underclass in order to get to know Claire Forster (herself a member of the lower class) in an attempt at getting Claire to explain how she set Julian up. Margaret does this successfully; she gets Cliare drunk, and Claire then explains that her actions constitute an effort at getting even with Julian. Julian had ruined Claire's prospects for marriage by revealing to Long the baseness of his fiancée, after which Long, broken hearted, told Claire the wedding was off and proceeded to shoot himself. Julian is acquitted.

== Adaptations ==
The play was adapted as a movie on multiple occasions:

- In 1916 as The Woman in the Case, an American film starring Pauline Frederick and Alan Hale
- In 1916 as The Woman in the Case, an Australian film starring Jean Robertson and Fred Knowles
- In 1922 as The Law and the Woman, an American film starring Betty Compson and William P. Carleton
- In 1932 as The Wiser Sex, an American film starring Claudette Colbert and Melvyn Douglas
