= The Joan of Arc of Loos =

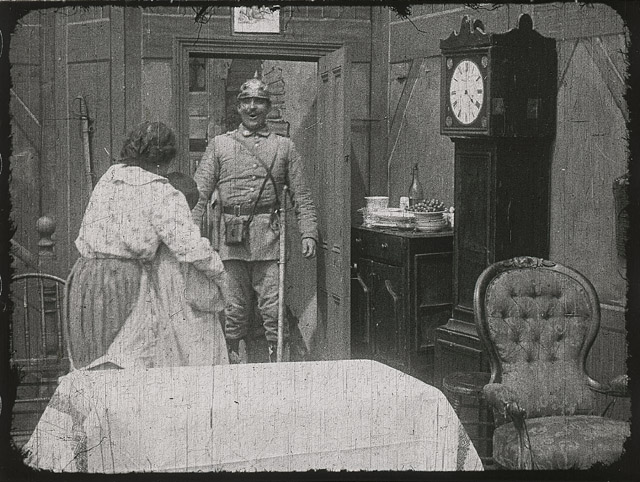
- Directed by: George Willoughby; Martyn Keith ("stage manager")
- Written by: Herbert Ford
- Starring: Jane King
- Cinematography: Franklyn Barrett
- Production company: Willoughby's Photo Plays
- Release date: 5 April 1916 (preview)
- Running time: 5,000 feet
- Country: Australia
- Languages: Silent film; English intertitles

The Joan of Arc of Loos is a 1916 Australian silent film shot by Franklyn Barrett based on the true story of Émilienne Moreau-Evrard in World War I. Only a portion of the movie survives today.

== Plot ==
The story is told in five acts. In 1915, German troops led by Captain von Epstein capture the peaceful town of Loos and start committing atrocities on the local population. Von Epstein lusts after a young peasant girl, Émilienne Moreau (Jane King), but she escapes to the Allied lines. Inspired by the vision of Joan of Arc (Jean Robertson), she helps encourage the Allied troops in an attack to retake the town. She falls for a French dispatch rider (Clive Farnham) who is captured by the Germans and takes part in shooting German officers who are sniping on the Red Cross. Emilienne manages to engineer her lover's escape and winds up married to them. She is also awarded a military cross.

== Cast ==
- Jane King as Émilienne Moreau
- Jean Robertson as the angel
- Clive Farnham as soldier hero
- Beatrice Esmond
- Martyn Keith
- Arthur Greenaway
- Austin Milroy
- Harry Halley
- Winter Hall
- Irve Hayman
- Arthur Spence
- Fred Knowles

== Production ==
The movie was the first film from theatre entrepreneur George Willoughby.

The film was described as "one of the biggest picture undertakings yet attempted in Australia." The village of Loos was recreated on Tamarama Beach in Sydney by scenic artist Jack Ricketts. The battle was staged with 300 extras including 100 returned servicemen. An avenue of poplars near Randwick Racecourse was used as a stand-in for the Flanders countryside.

During production the film was known as Emilienne Moreau. Production was held up for a number of days when star Jean King collapsed after the filming of a scene "which necessitated very strenuous acting" and juvenile lead Clive Farnham was injured when a motorcycle he was driving during a scene skidded and threw him over a bridge.

== Reception ==
The movie was used as a recruitment tool however it was not a success at the box office and reviews were poor. Critics took particular exception to the story being old fashioned and suggesting the Battle of Loos was won by divine intervention rather than skill. However Jean Robertson received positive notices for her performance as the angel.

== See also ==
- Battle of Loos
