= Her Own Way =

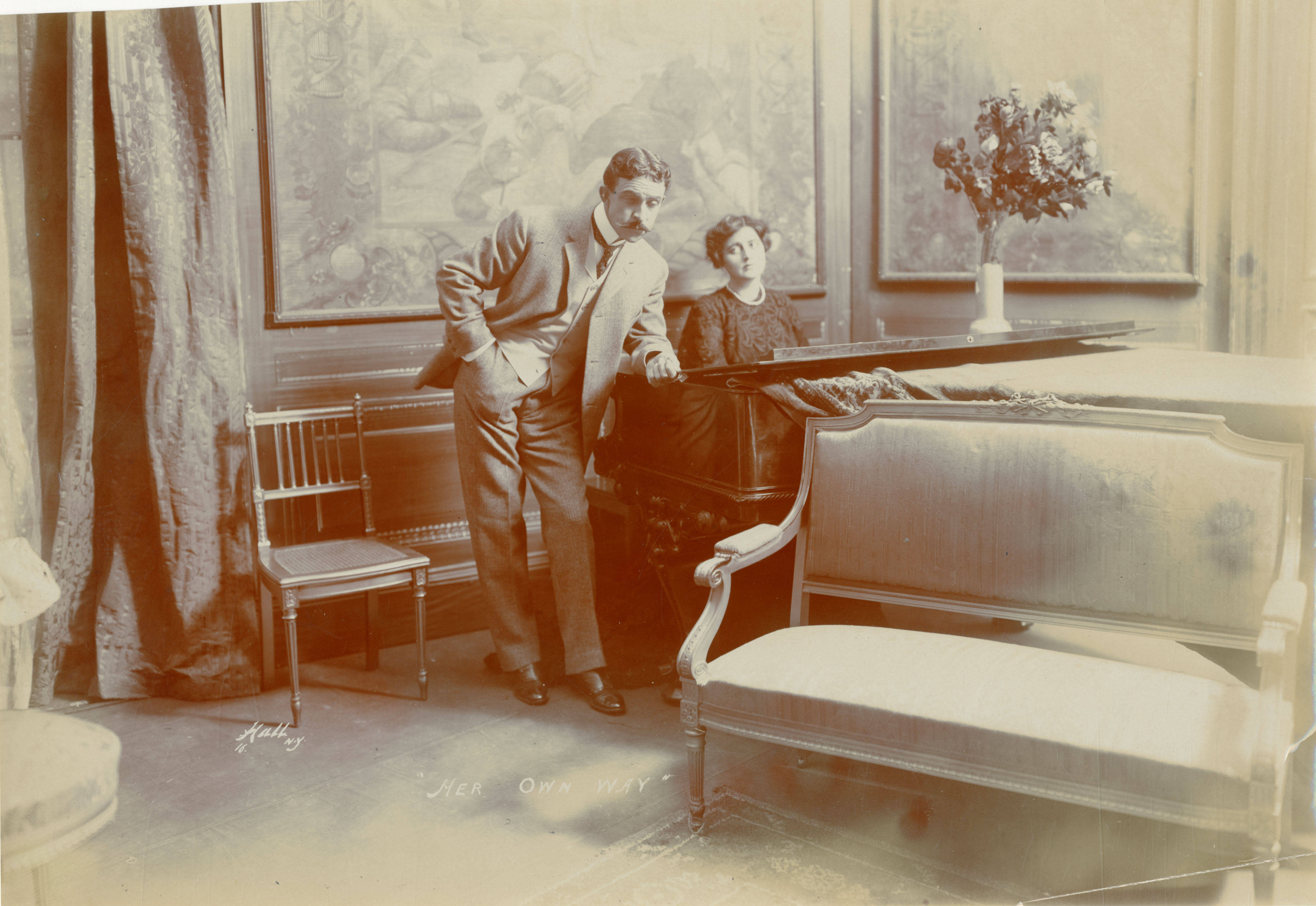
A scene from "Her Own Way," with Maxine Elliott and Arthur Byron.

Her Own Way is a play by Clyde Fitch. Written as a starring vehicle for actress Maxine Elliott, it premiered at the Star Theatre in Buffalo, New York on September 24, 1903. The production moved to Broadway where it made its New York City premiere at the Garrick Theatre on September 28, 1903. The United Kingdom premiere took place at the Lyric Theatre, London on April 25, 1905. It was adapted into a silent film of the same name in 1915.

Fitch was a modern and exacting director. Maxine Elliott recalls, "A great deal of attention was given to rehearsing this play, more than I ever knew to be given before." Four weeks of rehearsals from 10 in the morning until 5 in the evening with an hour for lunch were considered strenuous. Elliott continues, "To begin with, to each player was explained exactly what the character was that he was to enact. Then each part was gone over line by line, and the exact meaning of the words pointed out, or rather the meaning that it was intended to have. In this way the players and the author get in perfect sympathy."

The hard work put into Her Own Way paid off. An ornate set typical of Fitch plays was complete with leatherbound books, real doors, authentic tapestries, and real silverware. The acting as well as the set received rave reviews.
