= Jean Robertson (actress) =

Australian stage and screen actress

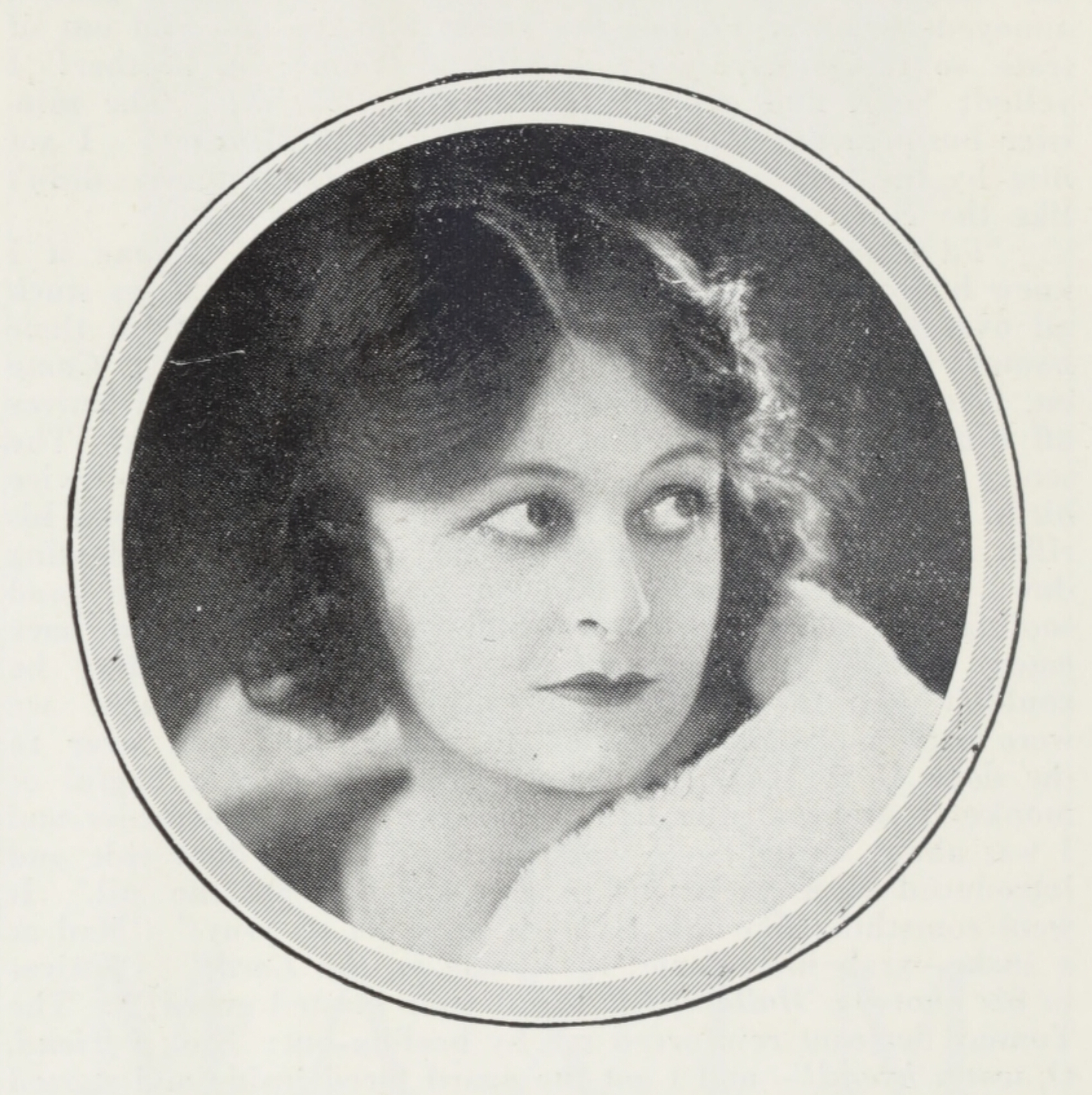
- Robertson in 1925
- Born: 16 February 1893; Adelaide, South Australia
- Died: 24 August 1967 (aged 74); Sydney, New South Wales
- Occupation(s): Stage and screen actress
- Spouse: Henry Herman Brose

Jean Robertson (16 February 1893 – 24 August 1967) was an Australian stage and screen actress.

== Biography ==
Robertson was born on 16 February 1893 and grew up in Adelaide, South Australia. She performed with the Adelaide Repertory Theatre, before moving to Melbourne in 1914 to begin her professional career with the Julius Knight Company. She also appeared with the George Willoughby Co. and J. C. Williamson Ltd.

Her first screen role was as the angel in George Willoughby's first film, The Joan of Arc of Loos and followed up as Margaret Rolfe in the 1916 Australian silent film, The Woman in the Case.

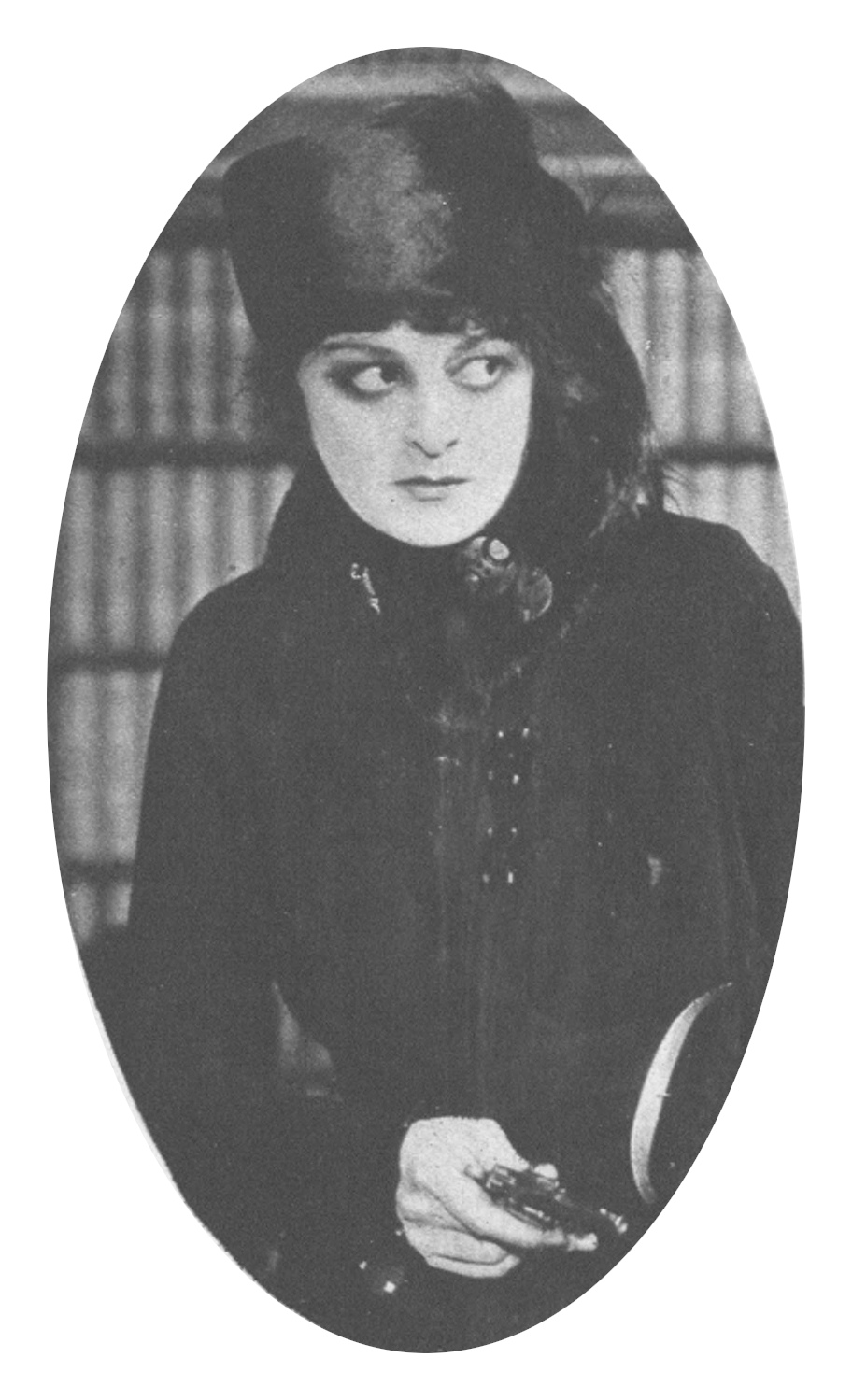
Robertson in The Unknown Woman in 1919

In 1917, she moved to America, where she starred as a Babylonian siren in The Wanderer on the New York stage the following year. She played the dope fiend in The Unknown Woman, with Lumsden Hare as her husband in New York in 1919. While overseas she toured in productions to San Francisco, Chicago, Boston, Philadelphia and Toronto. She appeared in the American 1922 film, Flesh and Spirit.

Back in New York she appeared in Lawful Larceny on Broadway, and transferred to London with the full production in 1922. She subsequently toured England in If Winter Comes.

Robertson returned to Sydney in 1924 and appeared as Portia in The Merchant of Venice in Melbourne with Maurice Moscovich. Following a successful run in The Outsider at the Theatre Royal, Melbourne, the play's producer, Moscovich, invited Robertson to perform the role in London. With Mosovich she toured New Zealand from June to August 1925 where the reviewer for the Evening Post described her in The Outsider as "one of the finest leading ladies we have seen. She possesses a lovely round voice, and uses all her grace and charm with telling effect."

She starred as Mrs Webster in Ken G. Hall's 1940 comedy film, Dad Rudd, M.P.. She filled the leading role in Schiller's play Mary Stuart in 1946 where her performance was described as "striking".

Her stage career continued into the 1950s when she appeared in the leading role of Lady Jane Franklin in the play Jane My Love at the Theatre Royal in Hobart.

== Personal ==
Robertson married scientist Henry Herman Brose in London on 14 May 1927. Their son, John Kelvin Brose, was born the following year.

Robertson died in Sydney on 24 August 1967. Her husband predeceased her in 1965.
