= The Law and the Woman =

1922 film by Penrhyn Stanlaws

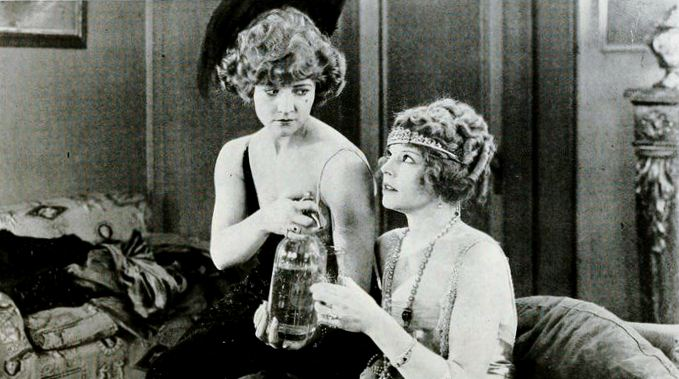
- Still with Betty Compson and Cleo Ridgely
- Directed by: Penrhyn Stanlaws
- Written by: Albert S. Le Vino (scenario)
- Based on: The Woman in the Case by Clyde Fitch
- Produced by: Famous Players–Lasky; Jesse Lasky
- Cinematography: Karl Struss
- Distributed by: Paramount Pictures
- Release date: January 22, 1922
- Running time: 70 minutes
- Country: United States
- Language: Silent (English intertitles)

The Law and the Woman is a 1922 American silent drama film directed by Penrhyn Stanlaws and starring Betty Compson. This film is a version of Clyde Fitch's play The Woman in the Case and a remake of a 1916 silent version The Woman in the Case starring Pauline Frederick. Jesse Lasky produced.

== Plot ==
As described in a film magazine, Phil Long returns from Paris after becoming engaged to the notorious vampire Clara Foster. She had previously ensnared Julian Rolfe, who is now happily married to Margaret. Phil is Julian's ward and, because he is wealthy, Clara is determined to marry him. Phil and Julian quarrel over the matter in Clara's apartment and later Phil is found dead in one of the rooms. Julian is convicted of murder and sentenced to death. By assuming the character of a woman of Clara Foster's type, Margaret secures a confession from Clara, who turns out to be the actual murderer. In dramatic fashion, Julian is saved from execution in the electric chair by just moments.

== Cast ==
- Betty Compson as Margaret Rolfe
- William P. Carleton as Julian Rolfe
- Cleo Ridgely as Clara Foster
- Casson Ferguson as Phil Long
- Henry A. Barrows as Judge Thompson
- Helen Dunbar as Aunt Lucy
- Clarence Burton as Bates
- J. S. Stembridge as Detective

== Preservation ==
The Law and the Woman is currently presumed lost. In February of 2021, the film was cited by the National Film Preservation Board on their Lost U.S. Silent Feature Films list.
