= Wingles =

- Commune
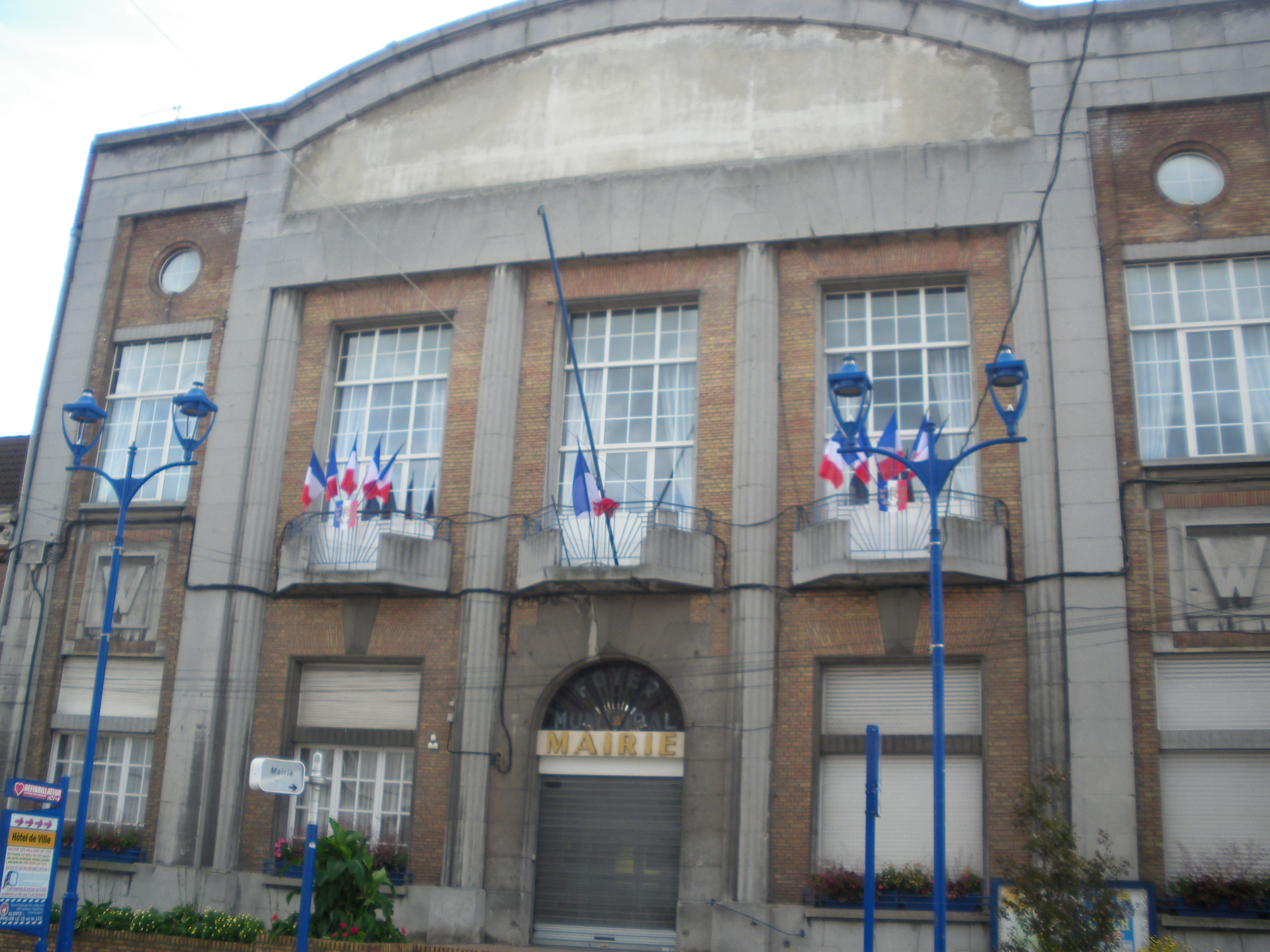
- The town hall of Wingles

- Coat of arms
- Location of Wingles
- Location within France Location within Hauts-de-France
- Coordinates: 50°29′41″N 2°51′22″E
- Country: France
- Region: Hauts-de-France
- Department: Pas-de-Calais
- Arrondissement: Lens
- Canton: Wingles
- Intercommunality: Lens-Liévin

Government
  - Mayor (2020–2026): Sébastien Messent
- Area^{1}: 5.93 km^{2} (2.29 sq mi)
- Elevation: 27 m (89 ft)
- Highest elevation: 36 m (118 ft)
- Lowest elevation: 14 m (46 ft)
- Population (2023): 8,720
  - Density: 1,470/km^{2} (3,810/sq mi)
- Time zone: UTC+01:00 (CET)
  - Summer (DST): UTC+02:00 (CEST)
- INSEE/Postal code: 62895 /62410
- ^{1} French Land Register data, which excludes lakes, ponds, glaciers > 1 km^{2} (0.386 sq mi or 247 acres) and river estuaries.

Wingles (French pronunciation: [vɛ̃ɡl]) is a commune of the Pas-de-Calais department in the Hauts-de-France region of France 6 miles (9.7 km) north of Lens.

== Population ==
Historical population
Year	Pop.	±% p.a.
1968	8,946	—
1975	8,348	−0.98%
1982	8,472	+0.21%
1990	8,742	+0.39%
1999	8,691	−0.06%
2007	8,185	−0.75%
2012	8,263	+0.19%
2017	8,770	+1.20%
2023	8,720	−0.10%
Source: INSEE

== Notable people ==
- Émilienne Moreau-Evrard, French resistance heroine, was born at Wingles in 1898.

== See also ==
- Communes of the Pas-de-Calais department
