= George Willoughby (theatre entrepreneur) =

English comic actor and theatre manager

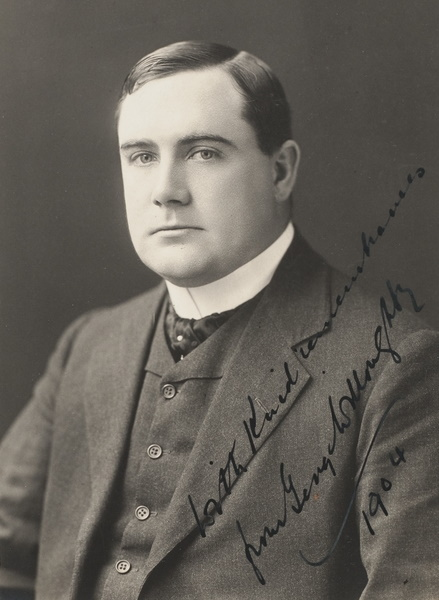
- Autographed portrait of George Willoughby, dated 1904.
- Born: George Willoughby Dowse c. 1869; Southsea, Hampshire, England
- Died: 23 December 1951 (aged 82); Lane Cove, New South Wales, Australia
- Occupation(s): actor; theatre manager
- Spouse(s): (1) Alice Mary Jackson (2) Rosina Kenna
- Parent: Henry James Dowse & Rosa (née Stevens)

George Willoughby Dowse (c. 1869 – 23 December 1951), professionally known as "George Willoughby", was an English comic actor and theatre manager who had a substantial career in Australia.

== History ==
George Willoughby Dowse was born in around 1869 at Southsea, Hampshire, England, the son of Henry James Dowse and Rosa (née Stevens). He may have been educated at Christ's Hospital.

George Willoughby was a member of the Charles Arnold theatrical company when he married actress Alice Jackson who adopted the professional name Ada Willoughby. He later, and with her consent, toured South Africa but while there received a postcard informing him that she no longer wanted to live with him. He later came in contact with her in Melbourne, when she was living with another man and he sued her for divorce.

=== Willoughby–Geach Company ===
Late in 1901 Willoughby and Edwin Geach formed a company (took over from Charles Arnold Company?) which toured Australia with a string of George Howells Broadhurst comedies: The Wrong Mr. Wright, Why Smith Left Home and What Happened To Jones Tragedy struck when two actresses, Sallie Booth and Ada Lee, died of bubonic plague on 27 and 28 February 1902 while staying at the Criterion Hotel, Pitt Street, Sydney.

In 1902 George, together with Thomas William Broadhurst and George Howells Broadhurst, who owned the rights to the play The Wrong Mr. Wright sought to prevent Henry Bloomfield, director of the Ada Willoughby Company, from playing a version of this play. The suit failed on the grounds that Willoughby had failed to prove that Charles Arnold was able to assign his rights to the play. This was around the same time as George had applied for a divorce from his wife, whose stage name was Ada Willoughby. In 1903 he successfully sought an injunction to prevent Robert Henry Nichols, of the Henry Dramatic Company, from playing a farce (adapted from Jane) with an almost identical title.

By 1904 Willoughby and Geach had taken over Sydney's Palace Theatre, with Adam Cowan (died 20 September 1908), Geach's trusted friend, as manager. Sidney Wilner and Walter Vincent's Stranger in a Strange Land was added to their repertoire in 1904, at the end of which year the company disbanded. Stars of the Willoughby – Geach company included Roxy Barton, Ethel Appleton, Hardinge Maltby, Tom Cannam, Frank Denton, George Leopold, Grace Gale and Miss Roland Watts Phillips.

=== Willoughby–Ward Company ===
He next formed an actor-management partnership with Hugh Joseph Ward and toured Australia and New Zealand with the ever-popular Broadhurst farces and "The Man from Mexico" (by Henry A. Du Souchet), the play in which Willie Collier, under the JC Williamson's banner and with the young John Barrymore in the cast, had failed.

=== George Marlow Limited ===
In 1912 George was appointed managing director of George Marlow Limited, owners of the Princess's Theatre, Melbourne, and lessees of the Adelphi, Sydney and King's Theatre, Fremantle but with George Thomas Eaton, and Arthur Bernard Davies sought an injunction to prevent George Marlow (born Joseph Marks) from interfering with the operation of the company.

In October 1913 Willoughby, Davies and Eaton bought out George Marlow's stake in the Adelphi and Princess theatres. But the war intervened and box office prices had to be reduced. In 1915 Willoughby and Co. were forced to sell their holdings back to Barlow and his backers, the Fuller brothers.

== Film career ==
He also made a number of feature films.

=== Film credits ===
- The Joan of Arc of Loos (1916) – film
- The Woman in the Case (1916) – film

== Family ==
George was a brother of Colonel Richard Dowse, D.S.O.

George married twice: (1) Alice Mary Jackson (professional name Ada Willoughby) in April 1894. He divorced her in 1903, citing Reginald L. Sheldrick as co-respondent. (These two married and set up an Australia-themed restaurant in New York). (2) Rosina Kenna of Orange, New South Wales on 30 April 1906. They had one son:

- Henry Esmonde Willoughby "Pat" Dowse (7 August 1907 – ) married Sheila Dorothea Rule in 1940. He practised as a solicitor.

Their home in 1907 was "Carisbrook", Potts Point, Double Bay in 1940, and Northwood Road, Lane Cove in 1951.
