= Clyde Fitch =

American playwright (1865–1909)

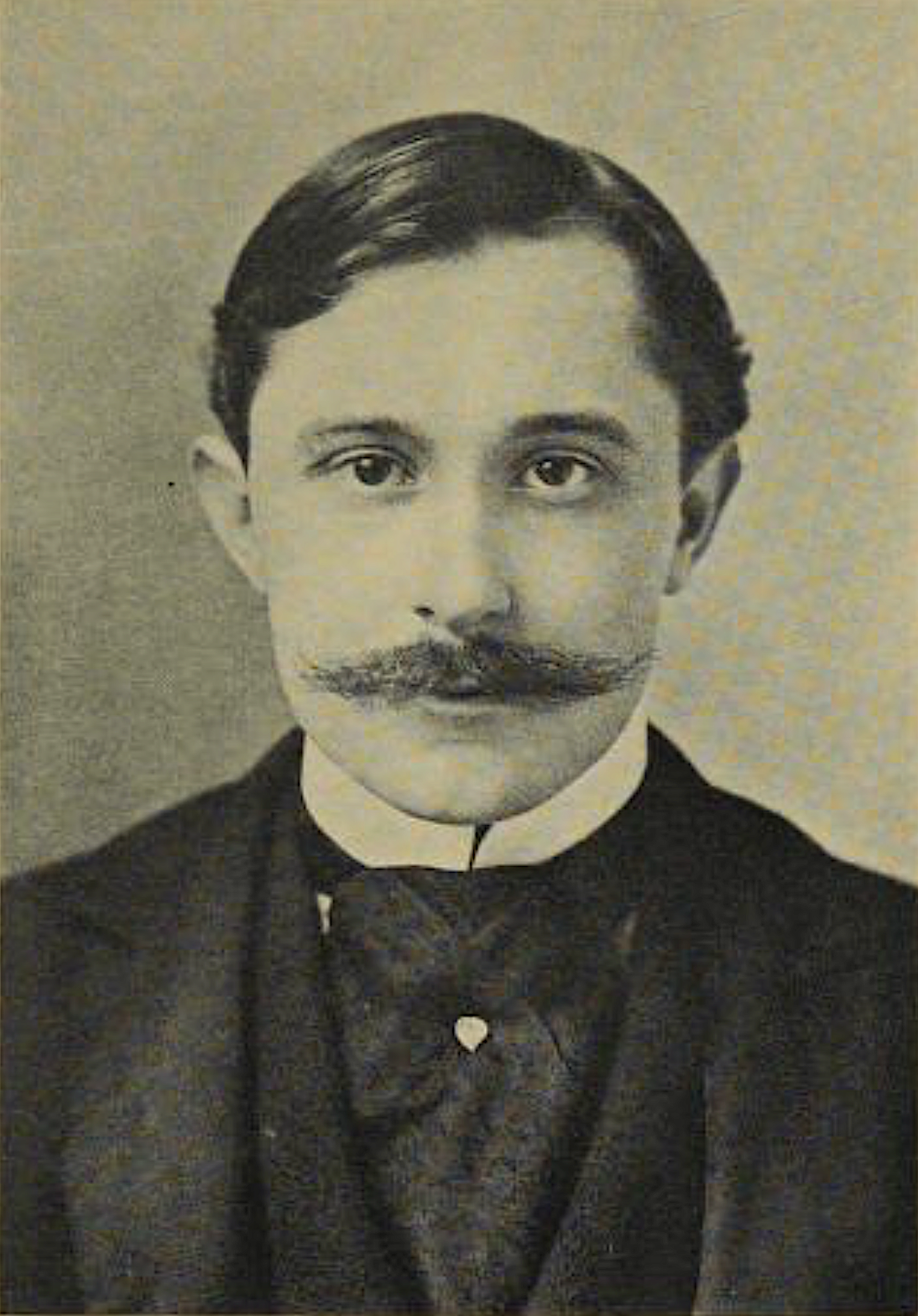
Clyde Fitch

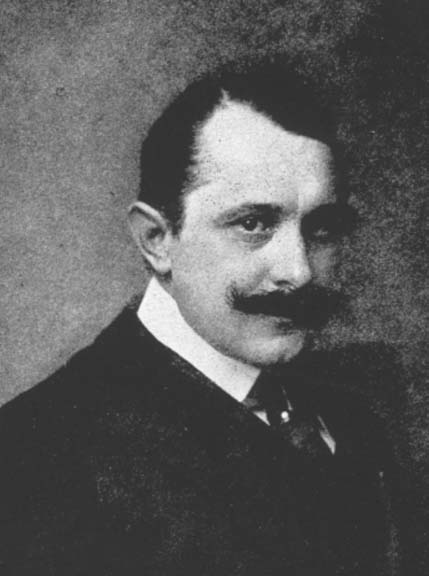
Portrait of Clyde Fitch

William Clyde Fitch (May 2, 1865 – September 4, 1909) was an American dramatist, the most popular writer for the Broadway stage of his time (c. 1890 – c. 1909).

Born in Elmira, New York, and educated at Holderness School (1879–1882) and Amherst College (class of 1886), William Clyde Fitch wrote 62 plays, 36 of them original, ranging from social comedies and farces to melodrama and historical dramas.

== Early life and education ==
His father, Captain William Goodwin Fitch, a graduate of West Point and briefly a Union officer in the Civil War before being discharged for disability in 1861, encouraged his son to become an architect or to engage in a career of business; but his mother, Alice Maude Clark, in whose eyes he could do no wrong, always believed in his artistic talent. She would frequently visit him at Holderness, and later at Amherst. (For her son's final resting place, she hired the architectural firm of Hunt & Hunt to design the sarcophagus set inside an open Tuscan temple at Woodlawn Cemetery in the Bronx.)

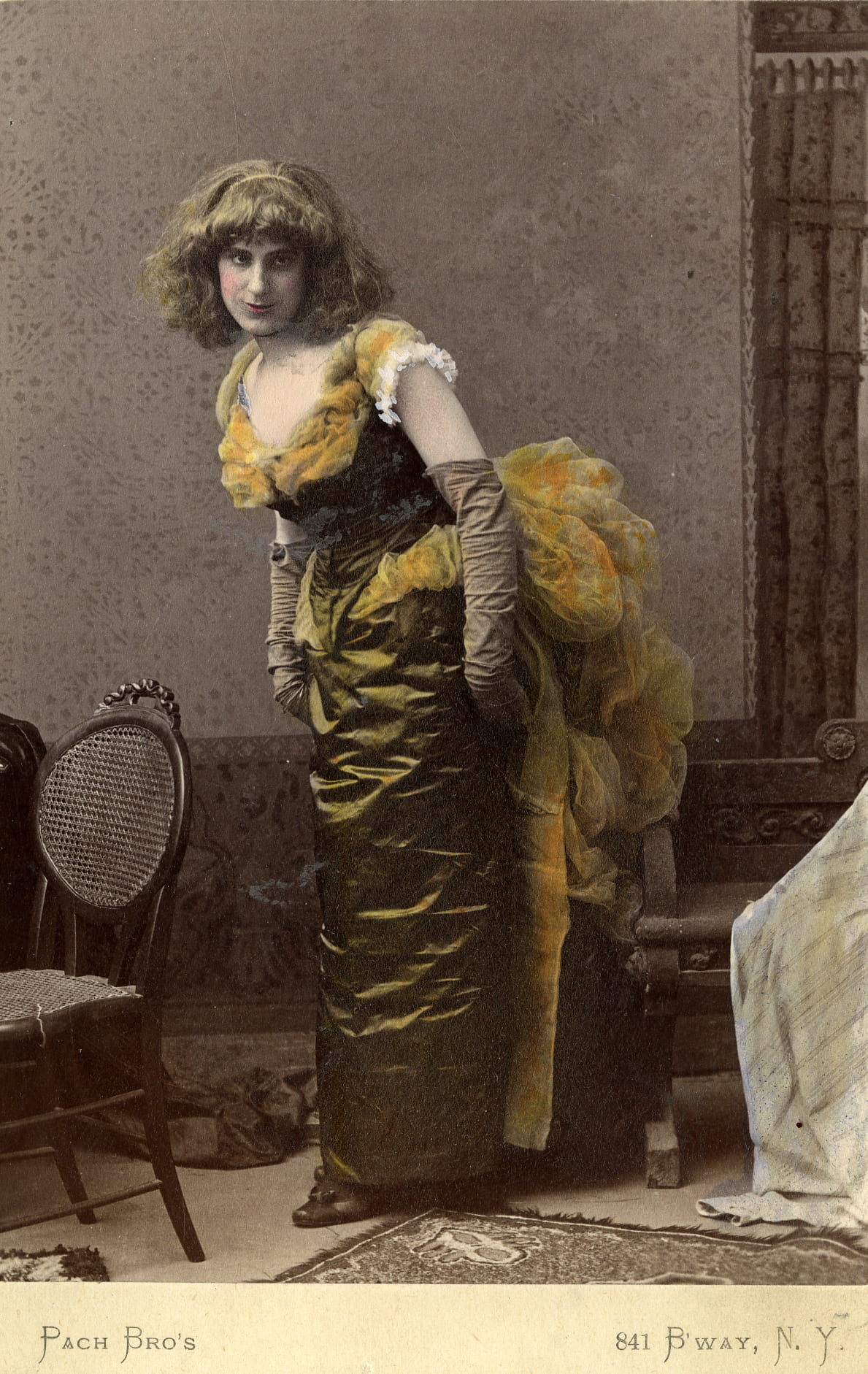
Clyde Fitch as Peggy Thrift in "The Country Girl" at Amherst College, 1884

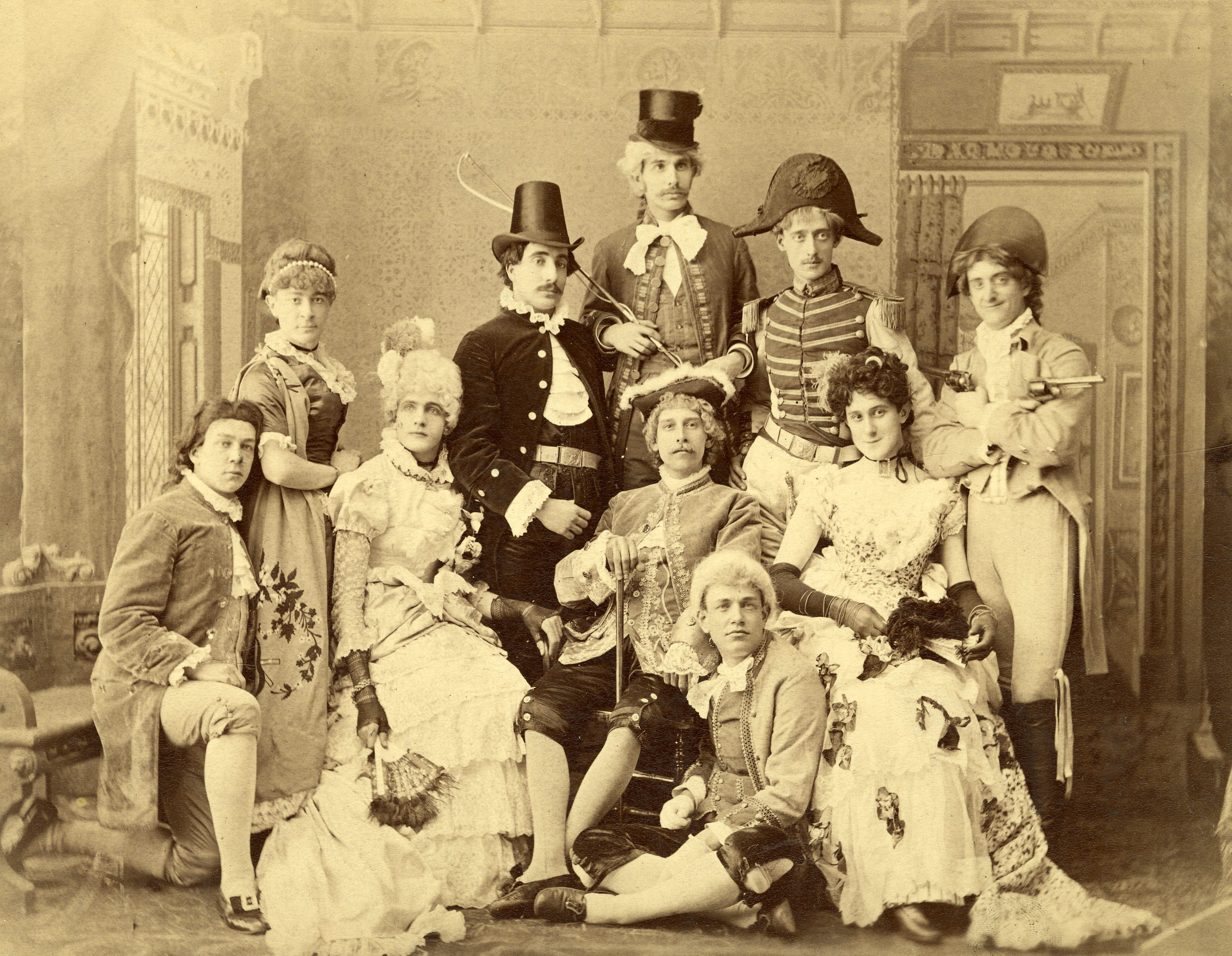
Cast of "The Rivals" at Amherst College, 1885 (Fitch seated, far right)

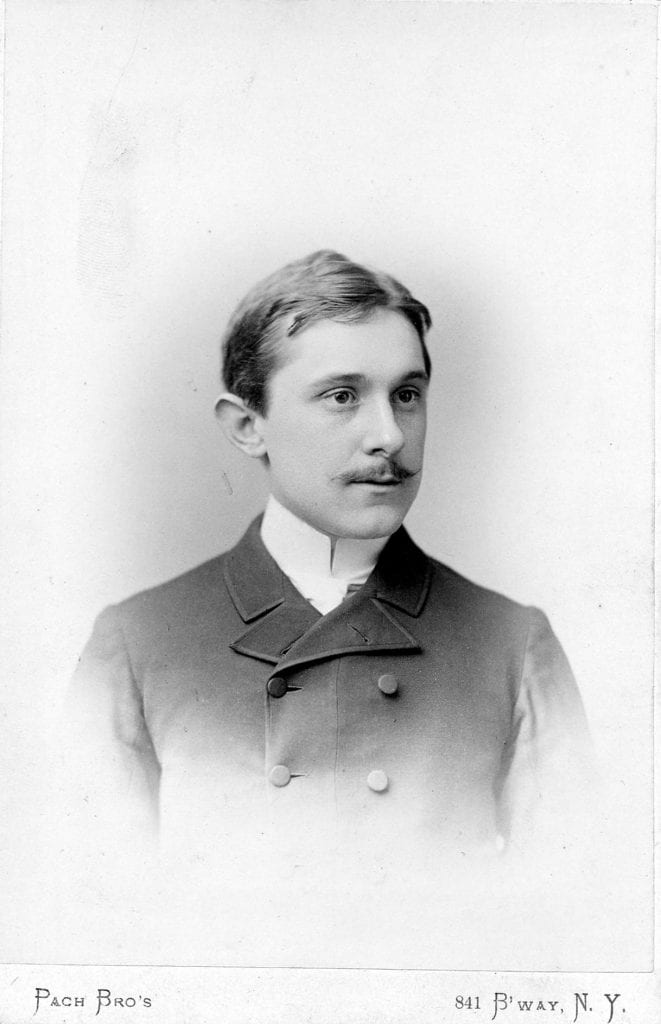
Clyde Fitch. ca. 1886

Fitch graduated from Amherst in 1886, where he was a member of Chi Psi fraternity. As an undergraduate, according to Brooks Atkinson, "he dazzled his fellow students with his flair for dress and his virtuosity as an amateur actor." In Amherst's 1884 Olio, his wearing a sky blue suit is mentioned humorously. During his time at Amherst, he played Miss Neville in an 1884 production of Oliver Goldsmith's 1773 comedy "She Stoops to Conquer", Lydia Languish in Richard Brinsley Sheridan's 1775 comedy "The Rivals" the next year, and Peggy Thrift in David Garrick's 1766 comedy "The Country Girl" the next.

== Career ==
Fitch began his work in New York City, writing jokes and verses for the magazines "Life" and "Puck", during which time he worked as a tutor to young children to support himself, which he disliked.

Fitch was one of the early American playwrights to publish his plays. His first work of note was Beau Brummell (1890), set in the English Regency and based on the life of the historical figure. The play became a lucrative showcase for actor Richard Mansfield (1857–1907), who played the title role for the rest of his life. His 1892 play Masked Ball (an adaption from Alexandre Bisson's Le Veglione) was the first time that producer Charles Frohman put Maude Adams with John Drew Jr., a pairing that led to many successes.

In 1893, Fitch was elected to The Lambs Club.

In 1899, The Cowboy and the Lady faced criticism for a lack of character development and consistency. However, this play was popular in the East, despite being considered inaccurate in the West.

In 1901, Captain Jinks of the Horse Marines made a star of Ethel Barrymore, great-aunt of Drew Barrymore. "Fitch had a special talent for writing female characters that female stars could act agreeably," theater critic and historian Brooks Atkinson wrote of him in his history of Broadway.

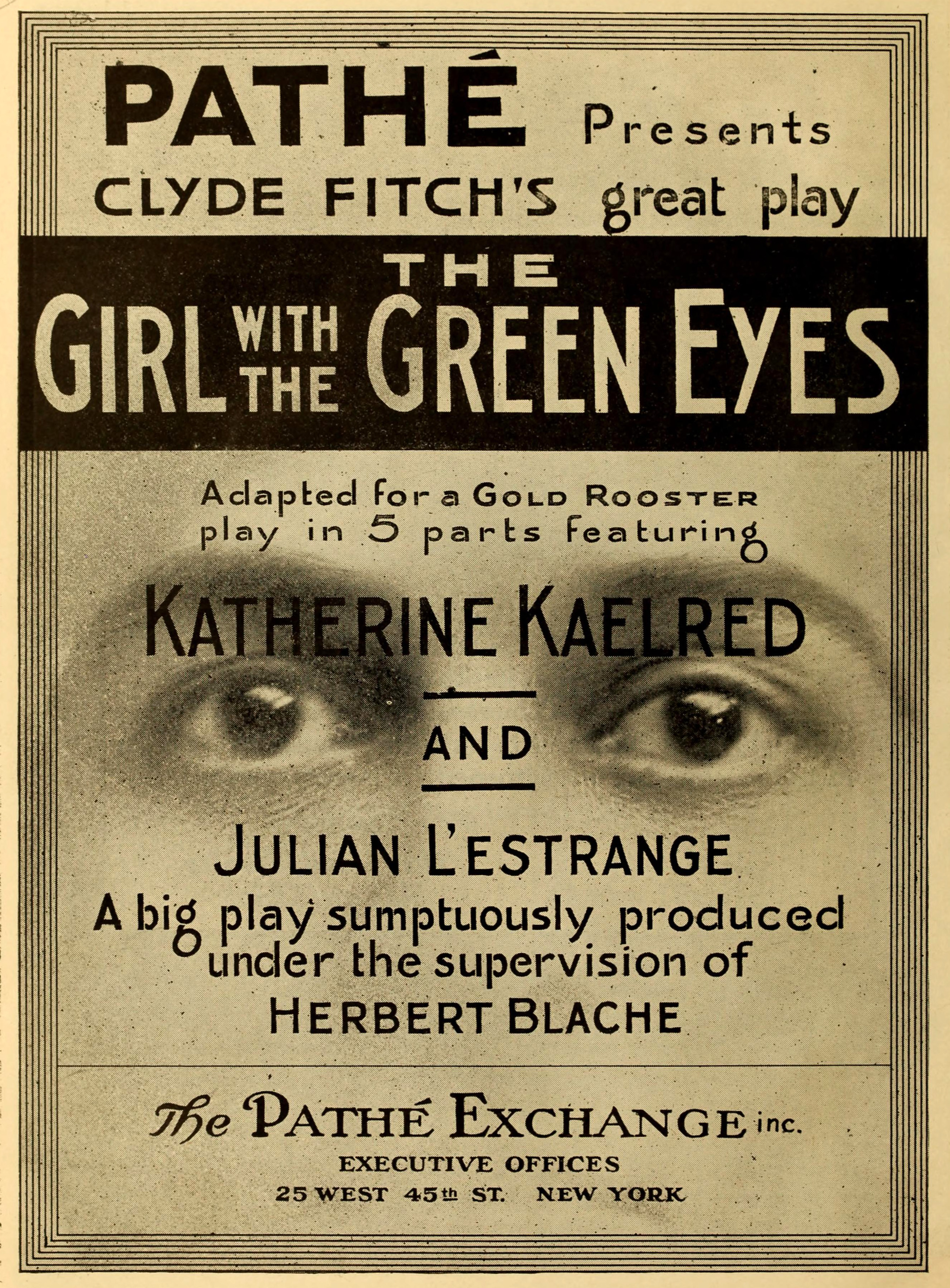
The Girl with the Green Eyes (1916)

Fitch was renowned in his time for works such as Nathan Hale (1898), The Moth and the Flame (1898), The Climbers (1901), The Girl with the Green Eyes (which ran 108 performances at the Savoy Theatre in 1902 and starred Robert Drouet as John Austin), Her Own Way (1903, starring Maxine Elliott), The Woman in the Case (which starred Drouet and ran for 89 performances at the Herald Square Theatre in 1905),The Truth (1907), The City (1909), and Girls (1910). His works were popular on both sides of the Atlantic. His play based on the heroine of John Greenleaf Whittier's poem Barbara Frietchie met with mixed reviews in 1899 because of the romance he added to the tale, but it was revived successfully many times. In 1896, he wrote the lyrics to a popular song "Love Makes the World Go 'Round", with an arrangement by William Furst.

The Climbers faced criticism in The North American Review for having an overdone premise, but its comedic moments were nonetheless praised.

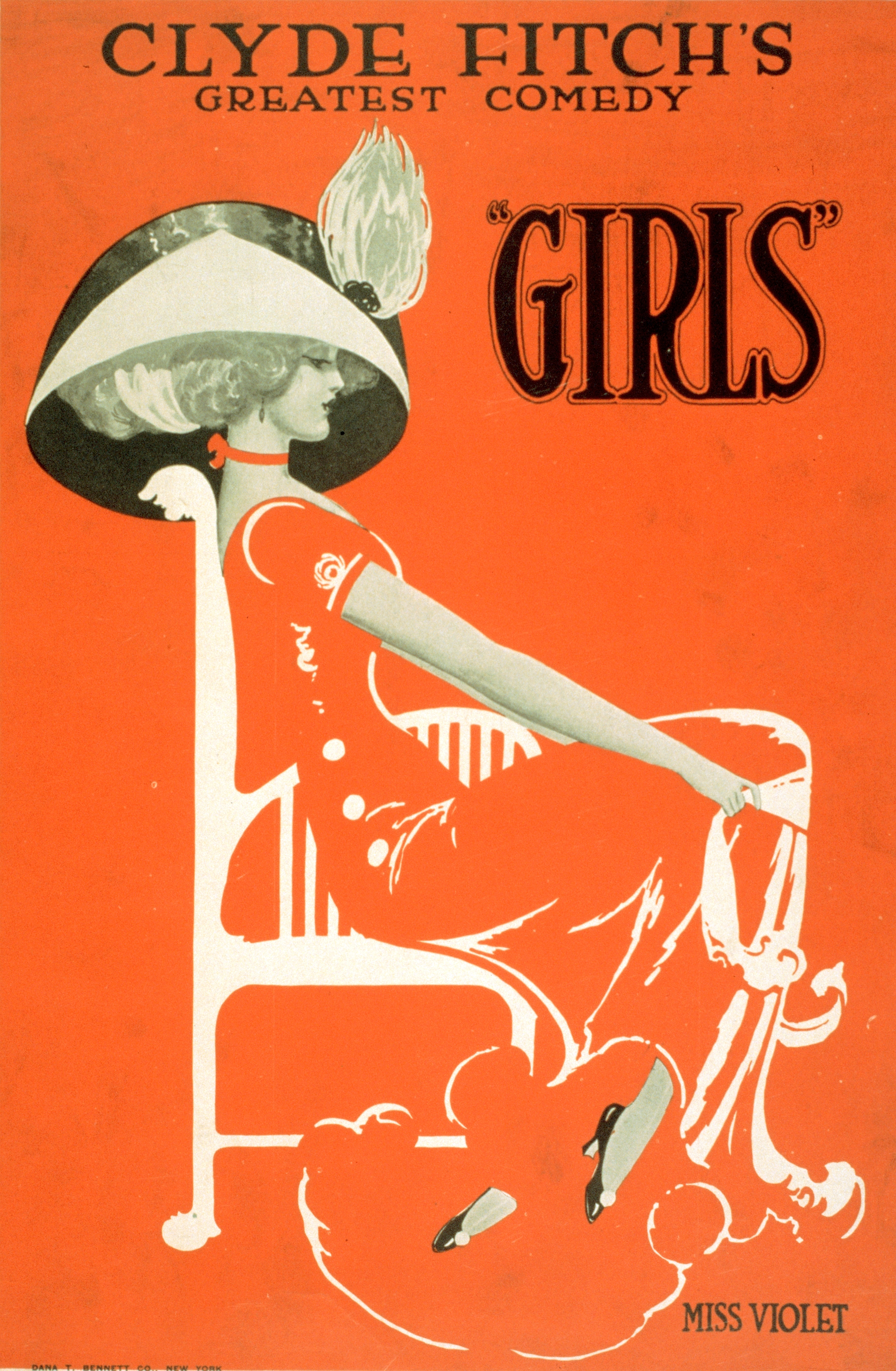
Poster for Clyde Fitch's comedy Girls, 1910

In December 1905, Fitch visited novelist Edith Wharton in her Park Avenue apartment to discuss collaborating on a dramatization of her novel The House of Mirth. Wharton was not a fan of Fitch's plays, which she regarded as more commercial than artistic, but knew him to be a consummate professional and the most likely writer to be able to bring Lily Bart's story to the stage. She also enjoyed his ironic sense of humor. (Wharton described her visitor as "a plump showily dressed little man, with his olive complexion and his beautiful Oriental eyes full of wit and understanding.") In the following months, they met in Paris and at the Mount, Wharton's estate in Massachusetts, to work on drafts, with Wharton taking responsibility for the dialogue and Fitch for the plot revisions. At one point, when the work was not going well, Wharton in frustration asked Fitch why he had ever thought her novel could be turned into a successful play. Incredulous, Fitch replied that he never had thought that it was a plausible endeavor. It then became clear, to their amusement, that each had been set up (probably by producer Charles Frohman) to believe that the project had been initiated by the other, and seduced by the thought of working with a famous person in another field, they had each agreed to collaborate. The play was the critical and commercial failure Wharton feared it would be, but the two became good friends.

Fitch's career spanned a brief two decades, but he earned upwards of $250,000 from his plays at a time when a dollar per day was the working wage. He directed at least two thirds of his plays and was involved in the production of all of them. He was the first American playwright to be taken seriously, and at one time, managed to have five plays running simultaneously on Broadway. "Once Clyde Fitch got his foot in the door," Brooks Atkinson wrote, "he dominated Broadway drama." Even more than his scripts, Fitch's directing was praised by those that acted for him.

A generous host with an engaging personality, Fitch was renowned as a raconteur. His invitations to Quiet Corner, his estate in Greenwich, Connecticut, were much sought after. He was a close friend of designer Elsie de Wolfe, who helped him find many of the furnishings for his Connecticut mansion, Manhattan townhouse, and other residences. At one point, she said "He knows more about women than most women know about themselves."

About his taste for luxury and his work habits, a friend remarked, "He lives like sultan and works like a dock laborer on an eighteen-hour shift." He was said to be devoted to his art, working with feverish rapidity, and laboring painstakingly over every detail.

== Personal life ==
A dandy by his early teens, Fitch knew that in school he was seen as a sissy, but he said, "I would rather be misunderstood than lose my independence." According to William Lyon Phelps, a former schoolmate, Fitch would write letters on perfumed light blue stationery during high school recess. Phelps, and other schoolmates, considered Fitch effeminate. In a letter to his mother at the time, Fitch proclaimed that he was in love with a schoolmate, whom he described as "very tony in knickerbockers".

In college, Fitch exclusively performed female roles in the theater. Female roles were necessarily played by men at the then male-only Amherst College, however, Fitch enjoyed unusual success in this. Outside of the theater, his foppish fashion sense was well known. A showy necktie and tight pants are mentioned in his letters, as is the pale blue suit which is also mentioned in Amherst's 1884 Olio. When he could not dress as a woman in the theater, he presented original skits with himself in female roles and enacted female impersonations at parties. In his rooms at Amherst, Fitch had collections of china and of dolls.

Contemporaries often reduced Fitch to his feminine sensibilities to the extent of ignoring the merits of his work. Compliments of his understanding the female nature well in his writing are likely backhanded in nature.

Fitch frequented locations known at the time to be popular with the subculture of men attracted to men. During the summer, he would vacation in Paris, where there was no legal penalty for sodomy, as well as Naples, Morocco, and Sicily. Fitch would usually travel with a male companion, as well as a valet.

Correspondence of the time points to a likely relationship, however brief, with Oscar Wilde. James Gibbons Huneker, a critic sympathetic to Fitch's wit and sense of the ironic, dropped a few broad hints about the playwright's sexuality in his columns when commenting on his "feminine manner of apprehending meanings of life," his not always believably masculine dialogue, and his reserve when dealing with passion between men and women. Huneker also wrote that, if Fitch slowed down and lived long enough, he might actually turn out a "masterpiece in miniature."

== Health and death ==
Fitch suffered from attacks of appendicitis but refused his American doctor's recommendation of surgery; instead he trusted the specialists in Europe who assured him that they could effect a cure over time without surgery. He left for Europe in Spring 1909 against his doctor's wishes.

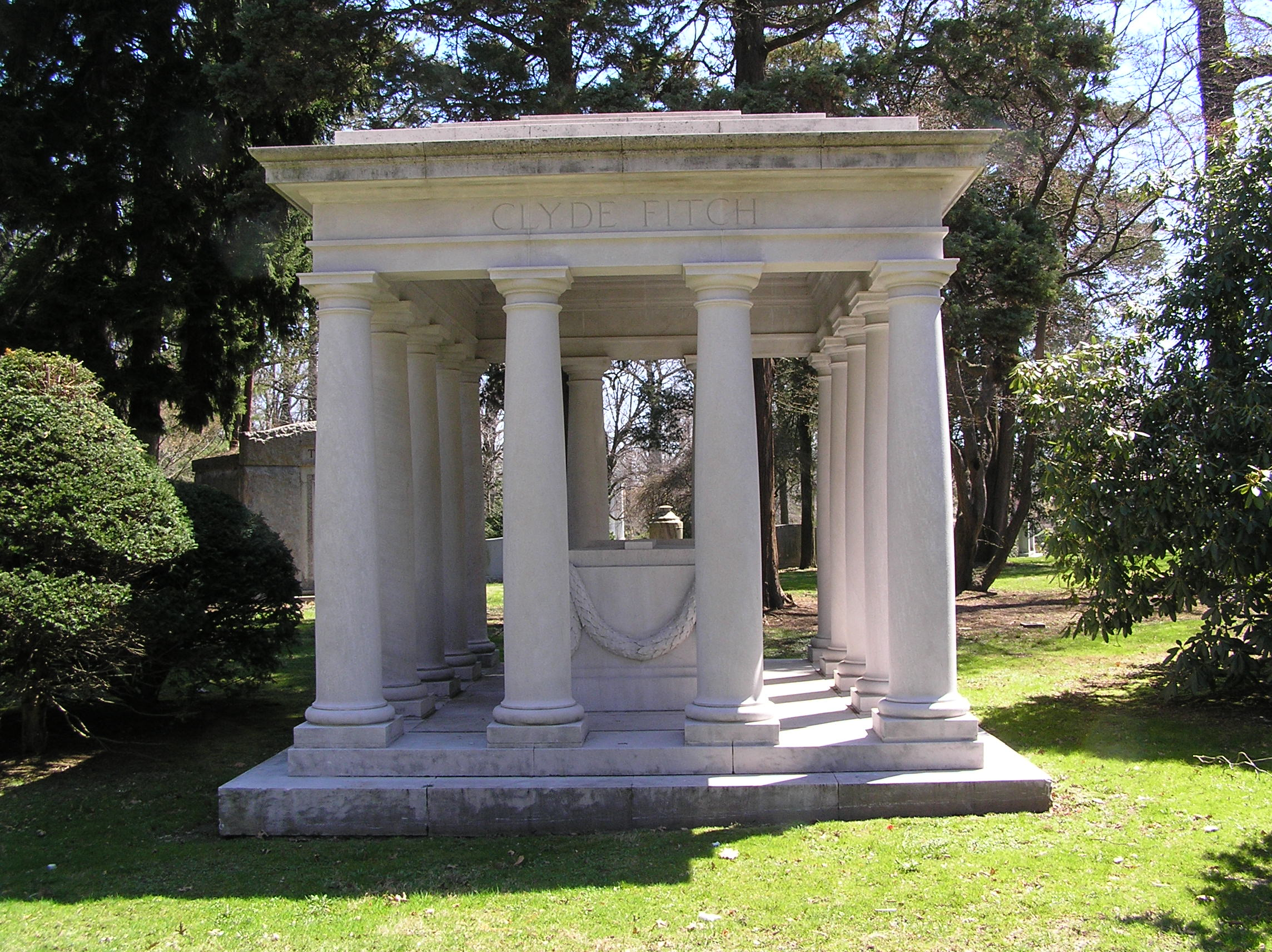
The gravesite of Clyde Fitch

While staying at the Hotel de la Haute Mère de Dieu at Châlons-en-Champagne in France, he suffered what would be a fatal attack. He underwent surgery by a local doctor rather than travel to Paris and died from blood poisoning aged 44. His body was returned from France where it was entombed for a time in the Swan Callendar Mausoleum at Woodlawn Cemetery in The Bronx, which belonged to a friend.

In 1910, the body was removed and taken to New Jersey for cremation, and the ashes were returned to the Swan Callendar Mausoleum until the Hunt & Hunt monument was finished. His ashes were placed in a sarcophagus (where his parents' ashes later joined his) in their own mausoleum in Woodlawn Cemetery.

After Fitch's death, his mother donated his library and furnishings to Amherst College, where they were installed as the Clyde Fitch Memorial Room in the newly built Converse Library. In memory of their son, Fitch's parents donated a large number of wax portraits, six painted wall panels, a bed, two console tables, three armchairs, a dressing table, two clocks, a nightstand, a fire fender, two candelabra, and an Aubusson carpet from the French Empire Period to the Metropolitan Museum of Art.

== Legacy ==
Since his death, Fitch has fallen into obscurity, but some of his plays were revived in repertory theaters in the twentieth century or made into films and adapted for television. The Archives and Special Collections at Amherst College holds a collection of his papers.

Silent film adaptations of Fitch's work include Girls, The City (1916), The City (1926), Lovers' Lane, and Barbara Frietchie. All are presumed lost. His play Beau Brummel has been adapted at least twice, once in 1924 under the title Beau Brummell with John Barrymore in the title role, and again in 1954 under the title Beau Brummell starring Stewart Granger and Elizabeth Taylor.

== Works ==
- Beau Brummell (1890)
- The Masked Ball (1892)
- An American Duchess (1893)
- Gossip (1895)
- Mistress Betty (1895)
- Bohemia (1896)
- The Liar (1896)
- A Superfluous Husband (1897)
- The Moth and the Flame (1898)
- The Head of the Family (1898)
- Nathan Hale (1899)
- Barbara Frietchie (1899)
- The Cowboy and the Lady (1899)
- Sapho (1900)
- The Climbers (1901)
- Captain Jinks of the Horse Marines (1901)
- Lover's Lane (1901)
- The Girl and the Judge (1901)
- The Curl and the Judge (1901)
- Captain Jinks of the Horse Marines (1901)
- The Way of the World (1901)
- The Marriage Game (1901)
- The Stubbornness of Geraldine (1902)
- The Girl with the Green Eyes (1902)
- The Bird in the Cage (1903)
- The Frisky Mrs. Johnson (1903)
- Her Own Way (1903)
- Major Andre (1903)
- Glad of It (1903)
- The Coronet of the Duchess (1904)
- Cousin Billy (1905)
- The Woman in the Case (1905)
- Her Great Match (1905)
- The Toast of the Town (1905)
- The House of Mirth (Oct 22, 1906 - Nov 1906)
- The Girl Who Has Everything (1906)
- The Truth (1907)
- The Straight Road (1907)
- Captain Jinks of the Horse Marines (1907)
- Her Sister (1907)
- Toddles (1908)
- Girls (1908)
- The Blue Mouse (1908)
- The Bachelor (1909)
- The Happy Marriage (1909)
- The City (1909)

== Sources ==
- Atkinson, Brooks. Broadway. New York: Atheneum, 1970.
- Moses, Montrose, J. The American Dramatist. Boston: Little, Brown, 1911.
- Winter, William. The Wallet of Time, Vol. I & II. New York: Moffat, Yard, & Co., 1913.
