= Fires of Fate =

Fires of Fate may refer to:

- Fires of Fate (play), by Arthur Conan Doyle based on his 1898 novel The Tragedy of the Korosko
- Fires of Fate (1923 film), a British-American silent film adaptation
- Fires of Fate (1932 film), a British sound film adaptation
