= The Desert Sheik =

1924 film directed by Tom Terriss

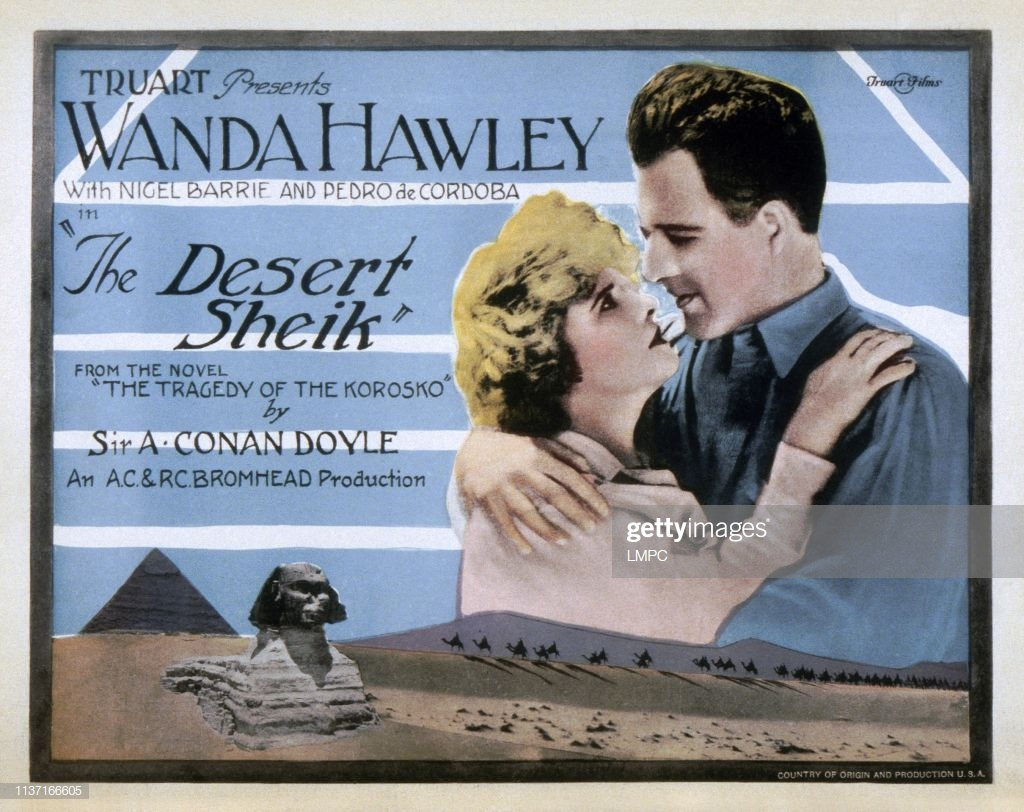
- Directed by: Tom Terriss
- Written by: Arthur Hoerl; Alicia Ramsey
- Based on: The Tragedy of the Korosko by Arthur Conan Doyle
- Produced by: A.C. Bromhead
- Starring: Wanda Hawley; Nigel Barrie; Pedro de Cordoba
- Edited by: Arthur Hoerl
- Production companies: A.C. Bromhead Productions; Truart Film Corporation
- Distributed by: Film Booking Offices of America
- Release date: July 21, 1924
- Running time: 60 minutes
- Country: United States
- Languages: Silent; English intertitles

The Desert Sheik is a 1924 American silent drama film directed by Tom Terriss and starring Wanda Hawley, Nigel Barrie and Pedro de Cordoba. British star Stewart Rome also appears in a supporting role. The story is inspired by the 1898 novel The Tragedy of the Korosko by Arthur Conan Doyle.

== Synopsis ==
An American woman in Egypt falls in love with a major in the British Army. While on a trip through the desert they are attacked by Bedouins, and the woman is captured. British troops stage a rescue mission.

== Cast ==
- Wanda Hawley as Corinne Adams
- Nigel Barrie as Major Egerton
- Pedro de Cordoba as Prince Ibrahim
- Edith Craig as Miss Adams
- Arthur M. Cullin as Sir Charles Roden
- Stewart Rome as Reverend Roden
- Douglas Munro as Mansoor
- Percy Standing as Stephen Belmont
- Cyril Smith as Lord Howard Cecil
- Hamed El Gabrey as Emir - Desert Sheik

== Bibliography ==
- Munden, Kenneth White. The American Film Institute Catalog of Motion Pictures Produced in the United States, Part 1. University of California Press, 1997.
