= The Man She Brought Back =

1922 film

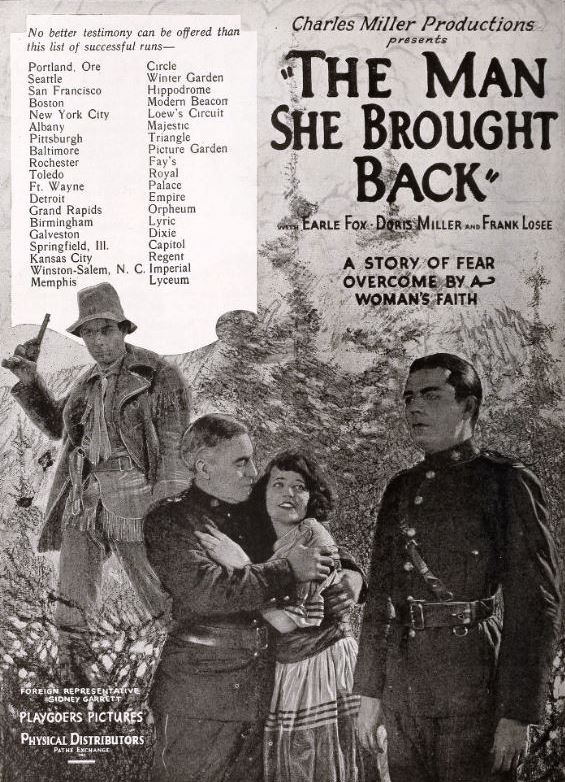
- Directed by: Charles Miller
- Written by: Jasper Ewing Brady
- Starring: Earle Foxe; Frank Losee; Frederick Burton
- Cinematography: Larry Williams
- Production company: Charles Miller Productions
- Distributed by: Playgoers Pictures
- Release date: July 23, 1922
- Running time: 55 minutes
- Country: United States
- Languages: Silent; English intertitles

The Man She Brought Back is a 1922 American silent Western film directed by Charles Miller and starring Earle Foxe, Frank Losee and Frederick Burton. It is a northern, portraying an officer of Canada's North-West Mounted Police.

== Cast ==
- Earle Foxe as John Ramsey
- Doris Miller as Margo
- Frank Losee as Fenton
- Charles Mackay as Major Shanley
- Donald Russ as Songatawa
- Harry Lee as Sergeant Hawkins
- Frederick Burton as Bruce Webster

== Preservation ==
The Man She Brought Back is currently considered a lost film. In February 2021, the film was cited by the National Film Preservation Board on their Lost U.S. Silent Feature Films list.

== Bibliography ==
- Connelly, Robert B. The Silents: Silent Feature Films, 1910-36, Volume 40, Issue 2. December Press, 1998.
- Munden, Kenneth White. The American Film Institute Catalog of Motion Pictures Produced in the United States, Part 1. University of California Press, 1997.
