= Wanda Hawley =

American actress

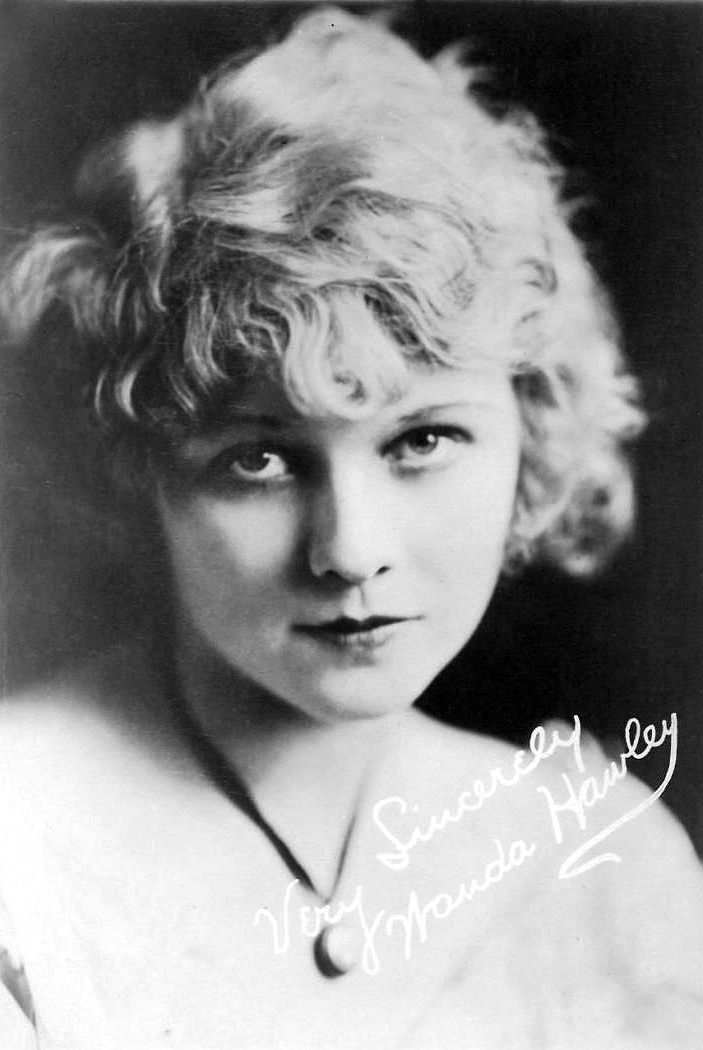
- Hawley, 1920
- Born: Selma Wanda Pittack; July 30, 1895; Scranton, Pennsylvania, U.S.
- Died: March 18, 1963 (aged 67); Los Angeles, California, U.S.
- Other name: Wanda Petit
- Occupation: Actor
- Years active: 1917–1931
- Spouses: Allen Burton Hawley (m. 1916; div. 1922) J. Stuart Wilkinson (m. 1925; div. 1933) Justus Livingston Richey (m. 1938; died 1957)

Wanda Hawley (born Selma Wanda Pittack; July 30, 1895 – March 18, 1963) was an American actress during the silent film era. She entered the theatrical profession with an amateur group in Seattle, and later toured the United States and Canada as a singer. She initially began in films acting with the likes of William Farnum, William S. Hart, Tom Mix, Douglas Fairbanks, and others. She co-starred with Rudolph Valentino in the 1922 The Young Rajah, and rose to stardom in a number of Cecil B. DeMille's and director Sam Wood's films.

== Life and career ==
Hawley was born Selma Wanda Pittack in Scranton, Pennsylvania, but together with her family moved to the Seattle, Washington area, when she was a child. She received her education in Seattle. She made her screen debut with the Fox Film Corporation, and after playing with them for eight months joined Famous Players–Lasky, where she appeared as leading lady in Mr. Fix-It (1918).

She married Allen Burton Hawley in 1916, and adopted his surname professionally. He died in 1925. On July 27, 1925, she married James Stuart (Jay) Wilkinson in Hollywood. In Wilkinson's passport application of January 1923, Hawley signed an affidavit stating she had known him for four years. According to Wilkinson's petition for divorce in 1933, Hawley left him in March 1928 when he refused to continue touring as an actor with her. In 1938, Hawley married Justus Livingston Richey in Roosevelt County, New Mexico. She was widowed in 1957 when Richey, a salesman, died of a heart attack.

She had also appeared opposite William S. Hart, Charlie Ray, Bryant Washburn, Wally Reid and others. She was five feet three inches high, weighed a hundred and ten pounds, and had blond hair and greyish blue eyes. She was an able sportswoman. With the advent of sound, Hawley's movie career largely ended; her last film was released in 1932. As her film career dwindled, in the late 1920s she performed sporadically in vaudeville comedy and legitimate theater. In April 1927, she cautioned young women hoping to make it in the movies, "Don't make that trip unless you have enough money to keep you for three years without working."

By late 1931, she was working for a cosmetic company. Her husband's divorce petition of 1933 stated she was then living in Seattle, her childhood home. She demonstrated and sold dresses in a department store in Tacoma, Washington. It is likely that she met her third husband, Jack Richey, in either Los Angeles or Seattle, as his 1920 census record has him living in the former and his 1930 census records show him living in the latter. She married Jack in 1938 in Roosevelt County, New Mexico and in 1940 they were living in Roswell, New Mexico, according to civic and census records; Jack promoted oil leases.

Contemporaneous Hollywood gossip columns report her living in Hollywood in 1941, Seattle in 1942 and Twin Falls, Idaho in 1943. By 1945 and the early 1950s, Twins Falls newspaper accounts describe and depict her looking happy in middle-class life, occasionally promoting local events, such as a local performance of a stage version of Peg O' My Heart, she having been made famous in the movie version of 1922. She is known to have enjoyed composing music; she and Jack copyrighted a song in 1945. She and Jack were traveling in Boise when he died of a heart attack in 1957.

== Partial filmography ==
- The Heart of a Lion (1917)
- Cupid's Round Up (1918)
- Mr. Fix-It (1918)
- Old Wives for New (1918)
- Cheating the Public (1918)
- We Can't Have Everything (1918)
- A Pair of Silk Stockings (1918)
- The Border Wireless (1918)
- The Gypsy Trail (1918)
- The Way of a Man with a Maid (1918)
- The Poor Boob (1919)
- Greased Lightning (1919)
- For Better, for Worse (1919)
- You're Fired (1919)
- Secret Service (1919)
- Told in the Hills (1919)
- The Lottery Man (1919)
- Everywoman (1919)
- Peg o' My Heart (1919)*(made but never released; held up by litigation)
- The Tree of Knowledge (1920)
- Double Speed (1920)
- The Six Best Cellars (1920)
- Miss Hobbs (1920)
- Her Beloved Villain (1920)
- Mrs. Temple's Telegram (1920)
- Held by the Enemy (1920)
- The Affairs of Anatol (1921)
- A Kiss in Time (1921)
- The Affairs of Anatol (1921)
- Her Sturdy Oak (1921)
- The House That Jazz Built (1921)
- The Snob (1921)
- The Love Charm (1921)
- A Trip to Paramountown (1922) – short
- Thirty Days (1922)
- The Young Rajah (1922)
- Too Much Wife (1922)
- Bobbed Hair (1922)
- The Truthful Liar (1922)
- The Woman Who Walked Alone (1922)
- Burning Sands (1922)
- Nobody's Money (1923)
- Masters of Men (1923)
- Fires of Fate (1923)
- Lights of London (1923)
- Mary of the Movies (1923) – cameo
- The Man from Brodney's (1923)
- Brass Commandments (1923)
- Bread (1924)
- Reckless Romance (1924)
- The Desert Sheik (1924)
- The Man Who Played Square (1924)
- Graustark (1925)
- The Unnamed Woman (1925)
- Barriers Burned Away (1925)
- Let Women Alone (1925)
- Smouldering Fires (1925)
- Who Cares (1925)
- American Pluck (1925)
- Wizard of Oz (1925)
- The Flying Fool (1925)
- Stop Flirting (1925)
- Men of the Night (1926)
- The Midnight Message (1926)
- The Last Alarm (1926)
- A Desperate Moment (1926)
- Hearts and Spangles (1926)
- The Smoke Eaters (1926)
- The Combat (1926)
- Pirates of the Sky (1926)
- Eyes of the Totem (1927)
- Pueblo Terror (1931)
- Trails of the Golden West (1931)
- The Crooked Road (1932)
