= The Midnight Message =

1926 film by Paul Hurst

- Directed by: Paul Hurst
- Written by: H. H. Van Loan(story, scenario)
- Produced by: Goodwill Pictures of California
- Starring: Wanda Hawley; Mary Carr
- Distributed by: Goodwill
- Release date: September 8, 1926
- Running time: 5 reels
- Country: United States
- Language: Silent (English intertitles)

The Midnight Message is a 1926 silent film drama produced and released by an independent producer. It was directed by Paul Hurst and starred Wanda Hawley and Mary Carr. A surviving film today at the Library of Congress, it is available on home video and DVD.

== Cast ==
- Wanda Hawley - Mary Macy
- Mary Carr - Widow Malone
- Johnny Fox - The Boy (*as John Fox Jr.)
- Stuart Holmes - 'Red' Fagan
- Creighton Hale - Billy Dodd
- Mathilde Brundage - Mrs. Richard Macy(*as Mathilda Brundage)
- Otis Harlan - Richard Macy
- Earl Metcalfe - Burl
- Karl Silvera - Thin
- Wilson Benge - Butler
