= The Flying Fool (1925 film) =

1925 film

- Directed by: Frank Mattison
- Written by: Ralph Spence (titles)
- Based on: The Ace and the Queen, short story by Putnam Hoover
- Produced by: Anthony J. Xydias
- Starring: Richard Grace; Gaston Glass; Wanda Hawley
- Cinematography: Bert Longenecker; Gus Boswell
- Distributed by: Aywon Film Corporation
- Release date: September 3, 1925
- Running time: 5 reels
- Country: United States
- Language: Silent (English intertitles)

The Flying Fool or just Flying Fool is a 1925 American silent comedy-drama film directed by Frank S. Mattison. It starred actor-stunt pilot Richard Grace and Wanda Hawley.

The film has been released on DVD as a double feature with a 1929 aviation film The Cloud Patrol.

== Cast ==
- Gaston Glass - Jack Bryan
- Wanda Hawley - The Bride
- Dick Grace -
- Mary Land -
- Eddie Harris - Phinneas Gibbs
- Maryland - The Bride's mother
- Dick Sutherland - The skipper of Jack's Yacht
- Dorothy Vernon - Mrs. Gibbs
