= Bab's Burglar =

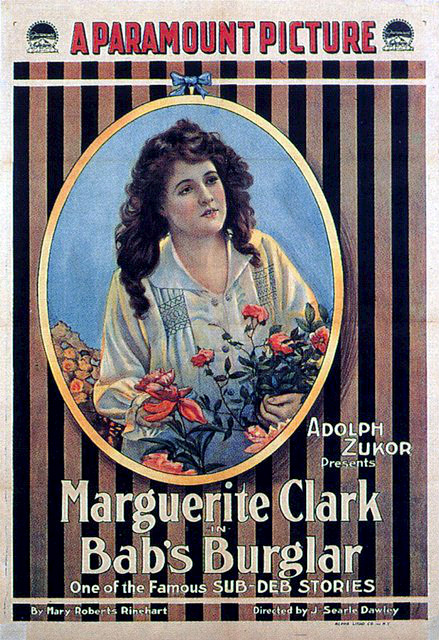
- Film poster
- Directed by: J. Searle Dawley
- Written by: Margaret Turnbull (scenario)
- Story by: Mary Roberts Rinehart
- Produced by: Adolph Zukor
- Starring: Marguerite Clark
- Cinematography: Lewis W. Physioc; H. Lyman Broening
- Production company: Famous Players Film Company
- Distributed by: Paramount Pictures
- Release date: October 28, 1917
- Running time: 50 minutes
- Country: United States
- Language: Silent (English intertitles)

Bab's Burglar was a 1917 American silent romantic comedy film directed by J. Searle Dawley and distributed by Paramount Pictures. The film followed Bab's Diary, released on October 17, 1917, and was the second in the trilogy of Babs films that starred Marguerite Clark.

Richard Barthelmess also appeared in an early role in his career.

== Plot ==
As described in a film magazine, Bab's father decides to give her an allowance capped at $1,000 per year. Bab, believing herself in possession of a small fortune, buys violets for all of her teachers and an automobile for herself, spending the remaining funds for its upkeep. After balancing her books, she finds that she has 16 cents left for the year. However, her father is right there to help her out. She is anxious to see her sister Leila married off so that she will be treated as a young woman. Bab mistakes the young man interested in her sister for a burglar and interferes with her sister's elopement. Disgusted at her failure to assist Leila, Bab retires, not knowing that she saved her sister from the hands of a fortune hunter.

== Cast ==
- Marguerite Clark as Bab Archibald
- Leone Morgan as Jane Raleigh
- Richard Barthelmess as Tommy Gray
- Frank Losee as Mr. Archibald
- Isabel O'Madigan as Mrs. Archibald
- Helen Greene as Leila Archibald
- Nigel Barrie as Carter Brooks
- Guy Coombs as Harry
- George Odell as The Butler
- William Hinckley
- Daisy Belmore

== Preservation status ==
All three Bab's films are now presumed to be lost.

== See also ==
- List of lost films
- Bab's Diary
- Bab's Matinee Idol
