= Nigel Barrie =

British actor (1889–1971)

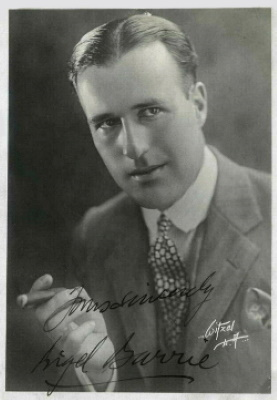
- Barrie c. 1918
- Born: Roynon Cholmeley Nigel Jones later known as Nigel Barrie; 5 February 1889; Calcutta, British India
- Died: 8 October 1971 (aged 82); Claremont, Cape Town, South Africa
- Resting place: Muizenberg, Cape Town, South Africa
- Occupations: Dancer and Actor in Hollywood and Great Britain, Pilot/Squadeon leader: Canadian Air Corp, Royal Flying Corp and Rhodesian Airforce, Tobacco farmer in Rhodesia, Real Estate and Property Auctioneer in Claremont, Cape Town, South Africa
- Spouse: Gertrude Elizabeth Annie Barrie

Nigel Barrie (5 February 1889, in Calcutta, British India – 8 October 1971, in South Africa) was an Indian-born British actor.

== Biography ==
Barrie's background as a dancer and actor on legitimate stages and in vaudeville in both Great Britain and the United States paved the way to early success in silent films. He made his screen debut in the 1916 adventure film serial Beatrice Fairfax. After playing Marguerite Clark's love interest in the 1917 Babs series, Barrie settled into a long career as a handsome supporting player, sometimes cast as villains with roles varying from boxer to romantic interests. Increasingly dignified in appearance with his natural build and good looks, the 6' 1" actor later played Captain Halliwell in The Little Minister (1921) and was Richard Barthelmess' formidable rival in The Amateur Gentleman (1926). Returning to Great Britain at the advent of sound, Barrie continued in films until at least 1938 when he relocated to live in Rhodesia and then South Africa.

In 1918, Barrie enlisted in the Royal Flying Corps.

== Filmography ==
- Beatrice Fairfax (1916)
- Patria (1917)
- Bab's Diary (1917)
- Bab's Burglar (1917)
- Bab's Matinee Idol (1917)
- The Marionettes (1918)
- Diane of the Green Van (1919)
- Josselyn's Wife (1919)
- Tangled Threads (1919)
- The Better Wife (1919)
- Widow by Proxy (1919)
- The Cinema Murder (1919)
- The Honey Bee (1920)
- The Notorious Miss Lisle (1920)
- The Turning Point (1920)
- The Girl in the Web (1920)
- A Slave of Vanity (1920)
- Charge It (1921)
- The Little Fool (1921)
- A Prince There Was (1921)
- Their Mutual Child (1921)
- The Little Minister (1921)
- White Shoulders (1922)
- Heroes and Husbands (1922)
- The Fast Freight (1922)
- East Is West (1922)
- Peg o' My Heart (1922)
- The Strangers' Banquet (1922)
- Fires of Fate (1923)
- The Bolted Door (1923)
- Lights of London (1923)
- Comedy of the Heart (1924)
- Claude Duval (1924)
- The Desert Sheik (1924)
- The Tower of Silence (1925)
- Express Train of Love (1925)
- Steel Preferred (1925)
- Mutiny (1925)
- Hogan's Alley (1925)
- The Amateur Gentleman (1926)
- The Love Thief (1926)
- The Traffic Cop (1926)
- Sunshine of Paradise Alley (1926)
- The Lone Eagle (1927)
- Husband Hunters (1927)
- The Climbers (1927)
- Home Struck (1927)
- The Shield of Honor (1928)
- The Ringer (1928)
- The Forger (1928)
- Cocktails (1928)
- The Plaything (1929)
- Under the Greenwood Tree (1929)
- Dreyfus (1931)
- Old Soldiers Never Die (1931)
- Passenger to London (1937)
- Anything to Declare? (1938)
