= Frank Losee =

American actor

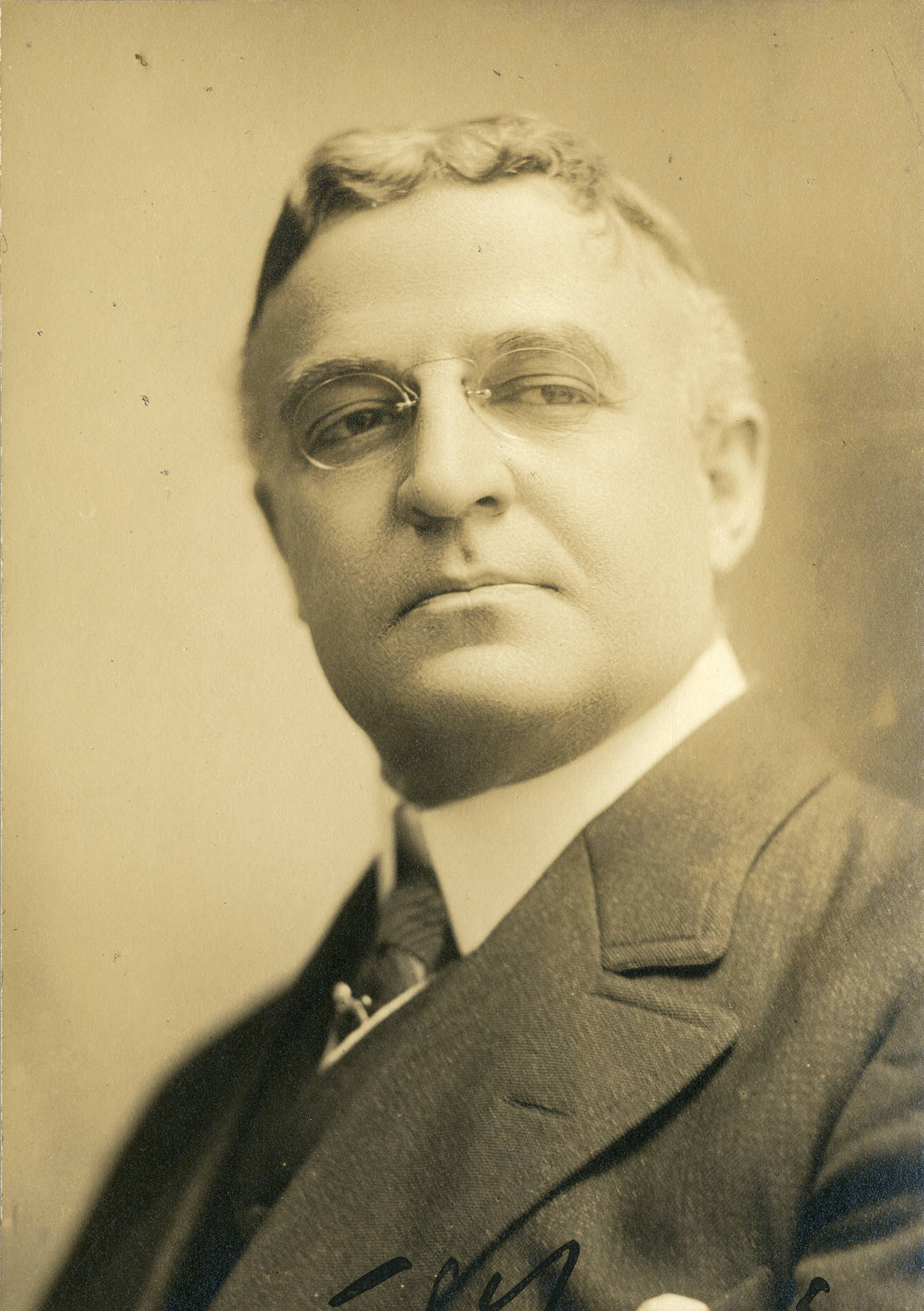
- Losee in 1909
- Born: June 12, 1856; Brooklyn, New York (state), USA
- Died: November 14, 1937 (aged 81); Yonkers, New York
- Occupation: Actor
- Years active: 1890s - 1935
- Spouse: Marion Elmore

Frank Losee (June 12, 1856 – November 14, 1937) was an American stage and screen actor. A veteran of the Broadway stage he began in silent films in 1915. Often he played the father of Mary Pickford, Pauline Frederick and Marguerite Clark.

== Career ==
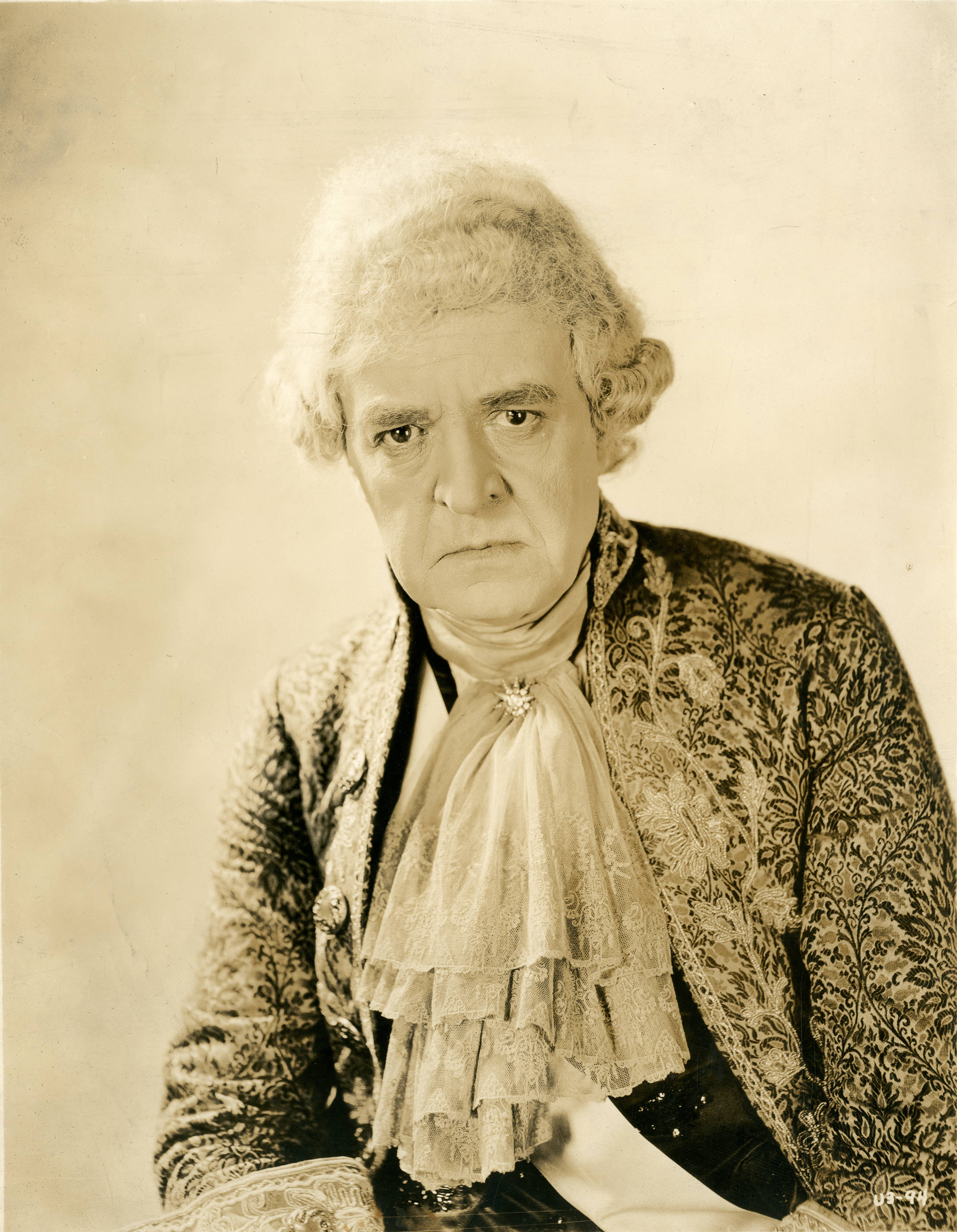
Frank Losee in the film Orphans of the Storm (1921).

Losee began as a professional actor with Hooley's Stock company, and he went on to act with several stock theater groups.

Losee's Broadway credits included Present Arms (1928), For All of Us (1923), Just Outside the Door (1915), The Hawk (1914), The Deadlock (1914), The Five Frankfurters (1913), Honest Jim Blunt (1912), The Return of Eve (1909), The Rose of the Rancho (1906), Mizpah (1906), Nancy Stair (1905), When We Dead Awake (1905), Friquet (1905), Dorothy Vernon of Haddon Hall (1904), Dorothy Vernon of Haddon Hall (1903), Sky Farm (1902), Richard Carvel (1900), A Young Wife (1899), Cumberland '61 (1897), and The Law of the Land (1896).

== Personal life ==
His wife was actress Marion Elmore. They were married in 1884, in Newark.

== Selected filmography ==
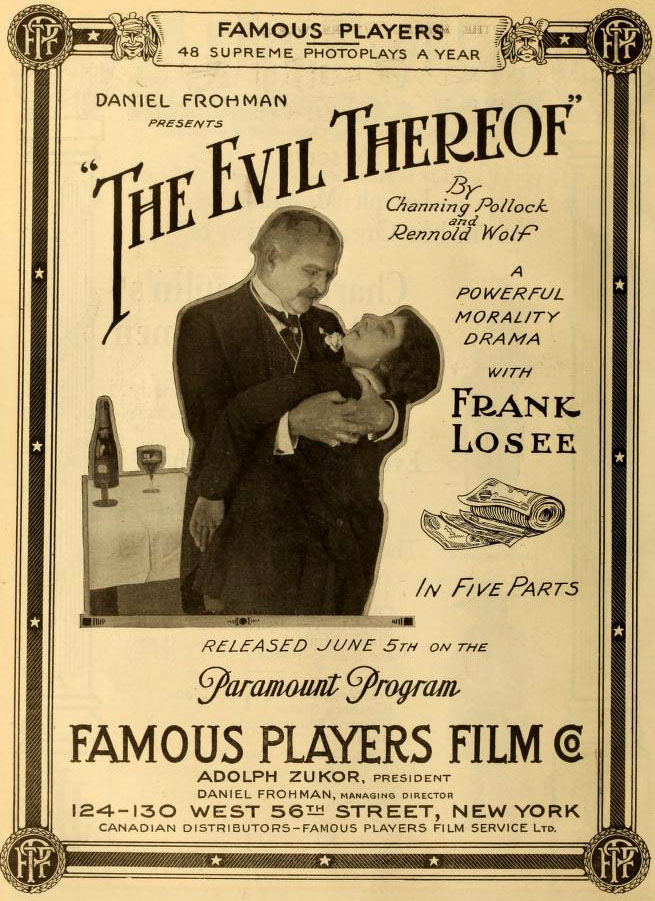

- The Eternal City (1915)
- Helene of the North (1915)
- The Masqueraders (1915)
- Diplomacy (1916)
- The Innocent Lie (1916)
- The Moment Before (1916)
- The Evil Thereof (1916)
- Hulda from Holland (1916)
- Ashes of Embers (1916)
- Less Than the Dust (1916)
- Miss George Washington (1916)
- The Valentine Girl (1917)
- Bab's Diary (1917)
- Seven Keys to Baldgate (1917)
- Bab's Burglar (1917)
- Bab's Matinee Idol (1917)
- Madame Jealousy (1918)
- The Song of Songs (1918)
- Sunshine Nan (1918)
- Uncle Tom's Cabin (1918)
- On the Quiet (1918)
- In Pursuit of Polly (1918)
- His Parisian Wife (1919)
- Here Comes the Bride (1919)
- Paid in Full (1919)
- Marie, Ltd. (1919)
- Civilian Clothes (1920)
- Right to Love (1920)
- The Fear Market (1920)
- Broadway and Home (1920)
- Lady Rose's Daughter (1920)
- Half an Hour (1920)
- The Riddle: Woman (1920)
- Such a Little Queen (1921)
- Orphans of the Storm (1921)
- The Man She Brought Back (1922)
- The Seventh Day (1922)
- False Fronts (1922)
- As a Man Lives (1923)
- The Speed Spook (1924)
- Unguarded Women (1924)
