= The Lost Squadron =

1932 film

- Original theatrical poster
- Directed by: George Archainbaud; James Anderson (assistant); Paul Sloane (dismissed partway through production)
- Screenplay by: Wallace Smith; Herman J. Mankiewicz (add. dialogue); Robert Presnell, Sr. (add. dialogue); Humphrey Pearson (uncredited)
- Based on: The Lost Squadron; 1932 novel by Dick Grace
- Produced by: David O. Selznick (executive producer)
- Starring: Richard Dix; Mary Astor; Joel McCrea; Robert Armstrong
- Cinematography: Edward Cronjager; Leo Tover
- Edited by: William Hamilton
- Music by: Max Steiner (uncredited)
- Production company: RKO Radio Pictures
- Distributed by: RKO Radio Pictures
- Release date: March 12, 1932
- Running time: 79 minutes
- Country: United States
- Language: English
- Budget: $621,000
- Box office: $732,000

The Lost Squadron is a 1932 American pre-Code drama, action, film starring Richard Dix, Mary Astor, and Robert Armstrong, with Erich von Stroheim and Joel McCrea in supporting roles, and released by RKO Radio Pictures. Based on the novel The Lost Squadron (1932) by Dick Grace, the film is about three World War I pilots who find jobs after the war as Hollywood stunt fliers.

The Lost Squadron was the first RKO production to carry the screen credit "Executive Producer, David O. Selznick".

== Plot ==
Pilots Captain "Gibby" Gibson and his close friend "Red" spend the last hours of World War I in battle in the air. They then join fellow pilot and comrade "Woody" Curwood and their mechanic Fritz in a promise to stick together, a toast and a chorus of "Auld Lang Syne", before returning home to an uncertain future.

Gibby's ambitious actress girlfriend Follette Marsh has a new boyfriend, one who can do more for her career. Good-natured Red decides not to take back his old job, now held by a married man with a new baby. Woody is penniless, swindled by his embezzling business partner.

Years later, Gibby, Red and Fritz ride a boxcar to Hollywood to look for Woody and find work in lean times. Outside a movie premiere, they spot a prosperous Woody, who is working as a stunt flier. He offers them well-paying jobs working for tyrannical director Arthur von Furst, who is married to Follette. Woody tells Gibby that he beats her. Woody introduces his three comrades-in-arms to his sister, "the Pest". She worries constantly about him: Von Furst utilizes dangerously worn-out aircraft, and Woody drinks a lot. She persuades all of them to give up stunt flying. They toast to it. However, they soon break their promise.

Both Gibby and Red are attracted to Pest. When he barely survives a crash, Gibby misinterprets her concern for him as love. Red impulsively asks the Pest to marry him. She agrees, and Gibby accepts the situation with grace.

Von Furst sees that his wife still has strong feelings for Gibby. He sabotages the aircraft Gibby is to fly for a dangerous stunt, secretly applying acid to some control wires, not only out of jealousy but also to add to the realism of his film. However, Woody decides to do the stunt in Gibby's place. Red sees von Furst tampering with the wires and alerts Gibby. Gibby takes off in another aircraft and catches up to Woody, but cannot make himself understood over the roar of their engines. The cable breaks, and Woody crashes and is killed.

Meanwhile, Red takes von Furst captive at gunpoint, promising to kill him if Woody dies. That night, after Woody's body is taken away, Gibby telephones the police to say that the accident he reported earlier may be a murder, but Red interrupts him. Gibby realizes Red has taken his gun and pursues him up the stairs to the office where Red has tied up von Furst. Gibby demands a written confession for the authorities. Von Furst knocks the lamp off the desk and tries to escape. In the struggle, Gibby drops the gun, and Red shoots and kills von Furst.

When Detective Jettick shows up in answer to Gibby's interrupted call, the men hide the body. Sensing something wrong, Jettick searches the hangar and insists on knowing where von Furst is. As he nears the canvas hiding the body, a scream stops him. It is Pest, worried about Red, returned to the hangar and startled by a policeman. Jettick leaves, promising to return. Pest is terrified that Red has hurt von Furst. Gibby sends her away with Red. Meanwhile, Gibby gives Fritz messages for the lovers, and they load the corpse into a plane. Gibby deliberately crashes, killing himself and taking the blame for the crime.

At the cemetery, two ghostly biplanes appear. To the strains of "Auld Lang Syne", Gibby and Woody look back, salute and disappear in the distance.

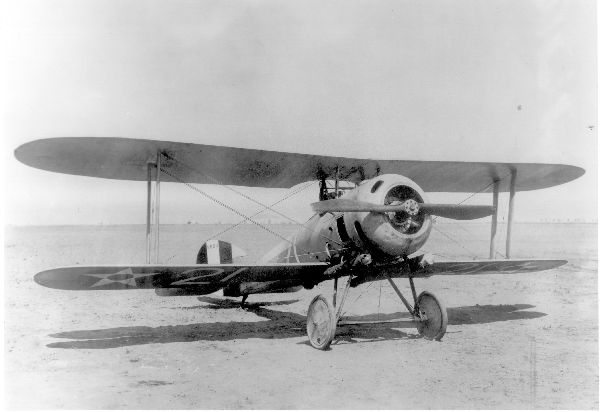
Nieuport 28

== Cast ==
- Richard Dix as Captain "Gibby" Gibson
- Mary Astor as Follette Marsh
- Robert Armstrong as Lieutenant "Woody" Curwood
- Dorothy Jordan as "Pest" Curwood
- Joel McCrea as "Red"
- Erich von Stroheim as Arthur von Furst
- Hugh Herbert as Sergeant Fritz
- Ralph Ince as Detective Jettick
- Marjorie Peterson as Stenographer
- Ralph Lewis as Joe
- William B. Davidson as Lelewer

Cast notes:

- Thomas A. Curran, an early American silent film star, plays an uncredited bit part.

== Production ==
While William LeBaron was still production chief at RKO, he started production on The Lost Squadron, but when he was fired, his replacement, David O. Selznick, took over the project as a personal production. As executive producer, Selznick fired director Paul Sloane and replaced him with George Archainbaud, and increased the film's budget to include more spectacular action sequences. Principal photography halted during the production as the RKO studio executives, including Selznick, decided to re-shoot the final scene to heighten the action of the climax, with a new ending written. Eric Linden, who had been borrowed from Warner Bros., was edited out of the final film.

The Lost Squadron boasted several first-rate aviation sequences, since the film was scripted by real-life Hollywood stunt flyer Dick Grace who flew in the film, as an uncredited "flier". Utilizing the Hollywood fleet of war surplus aircraft, the production featured many famous stunt flyers and their mounts, including Grace, Art Goebel, Leo Nomis and Frank Clarke. The aircraft seen on screen include two Nieuports, a Waco 10 and Bristol Fighter. (Note: The Bristol Fighter dressed up as a German aircraft made its one and only appearance in films in The Lost Squadron.)

== Reception ==
Having a screen idol such as Richard Dix made The Lost Squadron a popular feature. Although not considered a war film, the aviators' dilemma in reintegrating themselves back in a peacetime society represents an authentic effort at showing how returning veterans back from the front lines were treated.

Contemporary reviews were generally favorable with Mordaunt Hall, The New York Times critic, calling it "... an excellent melodrama, ably directed" and "... a story about aviators which can boast of a rich vein of originality and clever dialogue." The Variety review stressed the appeal of the film was in introducing a new story motif, the "story-within-a-story" of "behind the scenes" of an aerial film production. A controversy erupted over von Stroheim's portrayal of a tyrannical German director, resulting in the German consul in San Francisco delivering an official protest.

The film lost an estimated $125,000 at the box office.
