= Bab's Diary =

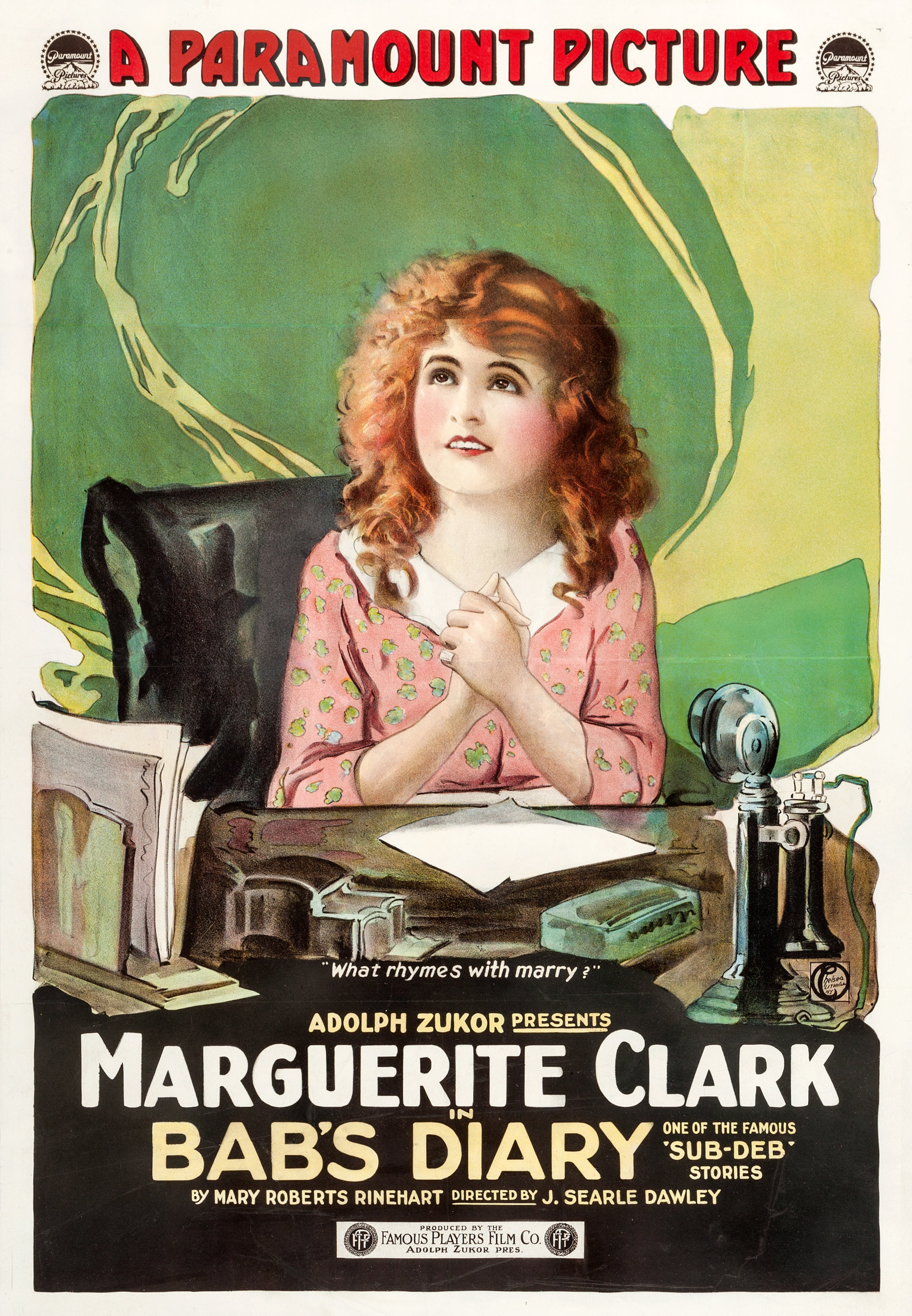
- Film poster
- Directed by: J. Searle Dawley
- Written by: Martha D. Foster
- Story by: Mary Roberts Rinehart
- Starring: Marguerite Clark
- Cinematography: Lewis W. Physioc
- Production company: Famous Players Film Company
- Distributed by: Paramount Pictures
- Release date: October 7, 1917
- Running time: 5 reels
- Country: United States
- Language: Silent (English intertitles)

Bab's Diary is a 1917 American silent romantic comedy film directed by J. Searle Dawley and starring Marguerite Clark. The film's scenario was written by Martha D. Foster, based on the screen story "Her Diary" by Mary Roberts Rinehart. This was the first in a trilogy of Babs films all starring Clark.

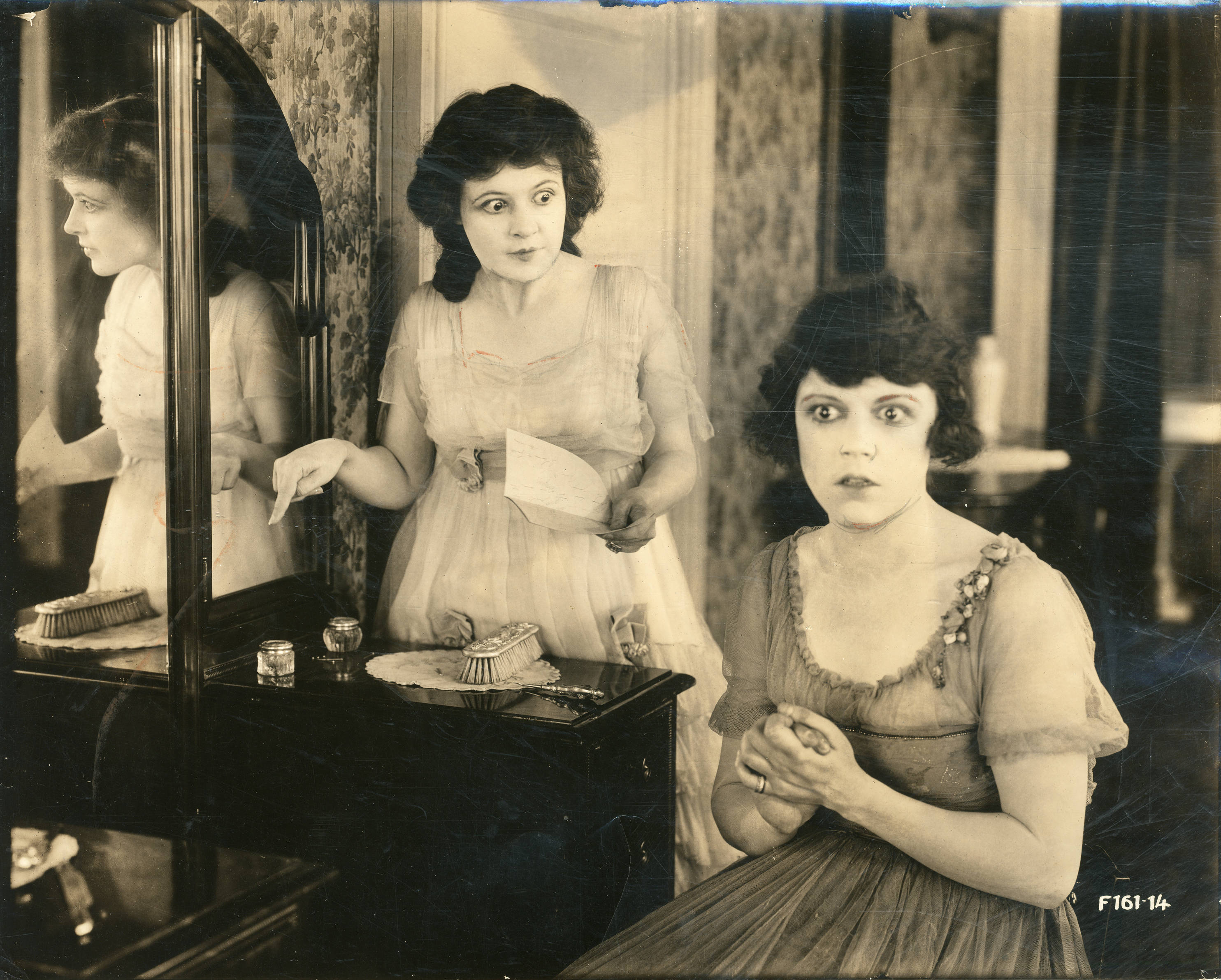
Scene in the film.

== Plot ==
As described in a film magazine, Barbara Archibald, nicknamed Bab, objects to being pushed into the background and, to give her family something to think about, declares that she is in love and is about to be married and end it all. She is amazed of the effect of her remark and thereupon invents a name for her lover and buys a photograph of a likely looking chap to pretend he sent to her. Matters become complicated when Carter Brooks, a friend of the family, announces to Bab that he knows her newfound friend and promises to bring him to a party so Bab can see him. He also volunteers to personally deliver an impassioned love note she penned to her imaginary sweetheart by the name she had selected for him. An actor made up like the photograph is introduced to Bab and persists in his attentions until she flees from the house. She wants to be rid of the love note and goes to the actor's apartment to secure it. An alarm is raised, and she is found by the police apparently drowning in the bathtub, into which she had fallen. Matters are straightened up at home, but she is sent back to school in disgrace.

The intertitles for the film are excerpts from Bab's diary which added to its amusement.

== Cast ==
- Marguerite Clark as Bab Archibald
- Nigel Barrie as Carter Brooks
- Leone Morgan as Jane Gray
- Frank Losee as Mr. Archibald
- Isabel O'Madigan as Mrs. Archibald
- Richard Barthelmess as Tommy Gray
- Helen Greene as Leila Archibald
- Guy Coombs as Harry
- John B. O'Brien as Harold Valentine
- George Odell as The Butler

== Preservation ==
With no prints located in any film archives, all three of the Bab's films are now presumed lost.

== See also ==
- List of lost films
- Bab's Burglar
- Bab's Matinee Idol
