= Alonzo G. Grace =

American educator and author

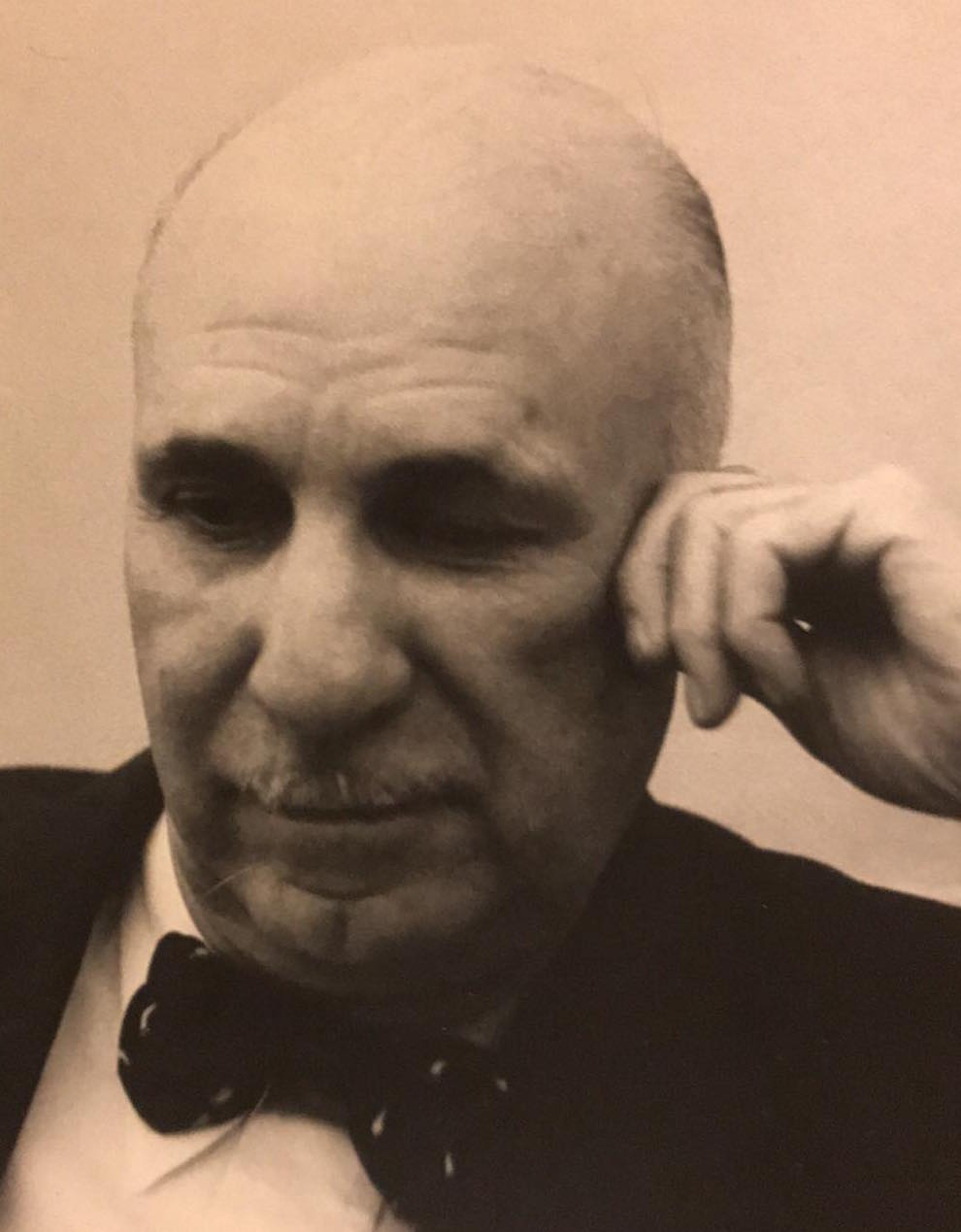
- Born: 1896; Morris, Minnesota, US
- Died: October 22, 1971 (aged 75); Andover, Connecticut, US
- Other names: A.G. Grace
- Education: University of Minnesota, B.A. (1917) M.A. (1920); Western Reserve University, P.h.D. (1932); Boston College, D.Sci (1946)
- Occupation: Educator
- Relatives: Dick Grace (sibling)

Dr. Alonzo G. Grace (1896-1971) was an American educator and author. He served as the Director of the Division of Education and Cultural Relations in the U.S. Office of the Military Government, and directed reconstruction of the German education system following World War II.

He was ahead of his time in several initiatives, advocating longer school days and increased partnership between students and parents. He was also a vocal advocate of lowering the voting age in the U.S. to 18.

== Career ==
He left his Professorship at the University of Rochester in 1938 to serve as Commissioner of Education for the State of Connecticut. He resigned in 1948 to direct educational reconstruction efforts in Germany. He later served as Chairman of the University of Chicago school of Education and as Associate Dean of New York University's School of Education. From 1966 – 1970 he was Dean of the School of Education at University of Illinois at Urbana–Champaign.

== Writing ==
- Problems in Amalgamation, 1920, University of Minnesota
- Immigration and Community Americanization, 1921
- Method of apportioning public money in New York, 1937, University of Rochester Department of Education
- Tomorrow's Citizens, 1940, Citizens' planning committee for public education in New Orleans
- The Second Hundred Years, 1943
- Changing Conceptions in Educational Administration, 1946, University of Chicago Press
- Educational lessons from wartime training, 1948, American Council on Education
- Cultural Exchange Program, 1949, Office of Military Government
- Basic Elements of Educational Reconstruction in Germany, 1949, American Council on Education
- Leadership in American education, 1950, University of Chicago Press
- Measurement of the Educability of Severely Mentally Retarded Children, 1959, New York University School of Education

(among others)
