= Heliotrope (film) =

1920 film by George D. Baker

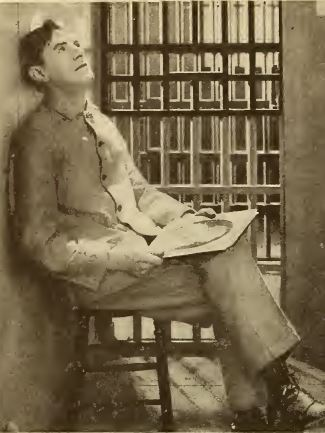
- Still with Frederick Burton
- Directed by: George D. Baker
- Screenplay by: George D. Baker; Richard Washburn Child
- Starring: Wilfred Lytell; Ben Hendricks Sr. Julia Swayne Gordon; Betty Hilburn; Diana Allen; Frederick Burton
- Cinematography: Harold Rosson
- Edited by: George D. Baker
- Production companies: Cosmopolitan Productions; International Film Service
- Distributed by: Paramount Pictures
- Release date: November 28, 1920
- Running time: 70 minutes
- Country: United States
- Language: Silent (English intertitles)

Heliotrope is a lost 1920 American silent drama film directed by George D. Baker and written by Richard Washburn Child and Will M. Ritchey. The film stars Wilfred Lytell, Ben Hendricks Sr., Julia Swayne Gordon, Betty Hilburn, Diana Allen, and Frederick Burton. The film was released on November 28, 1920, by Paramount Pictures.

== Plot ==
A convicted man secures his freedom to save his daughter from her manipulative mother, who intends to entangle the girl in a blackmail scheme.

== Cast ==
- Wilfred Lytell as Jimmie Andrews
- Ben Hendricks Sr. as Sol Goldman
- Julia Swayne Gordon as Josephine Hasdock
- Betty Hilburn as Mabel Andrews
- Diana Allen as Alice Hasdock
- Frederick Burton as Heliotrope Harry Hasdock
- Clayton White as George Andrews
- William B. Mack as 'Spike' Foley
- William H. Tooker as Governor Mercer
- Thomas Findley as Warden Michael Pyne
