= Dick Grace =

American stunt pilot (1898–1965)

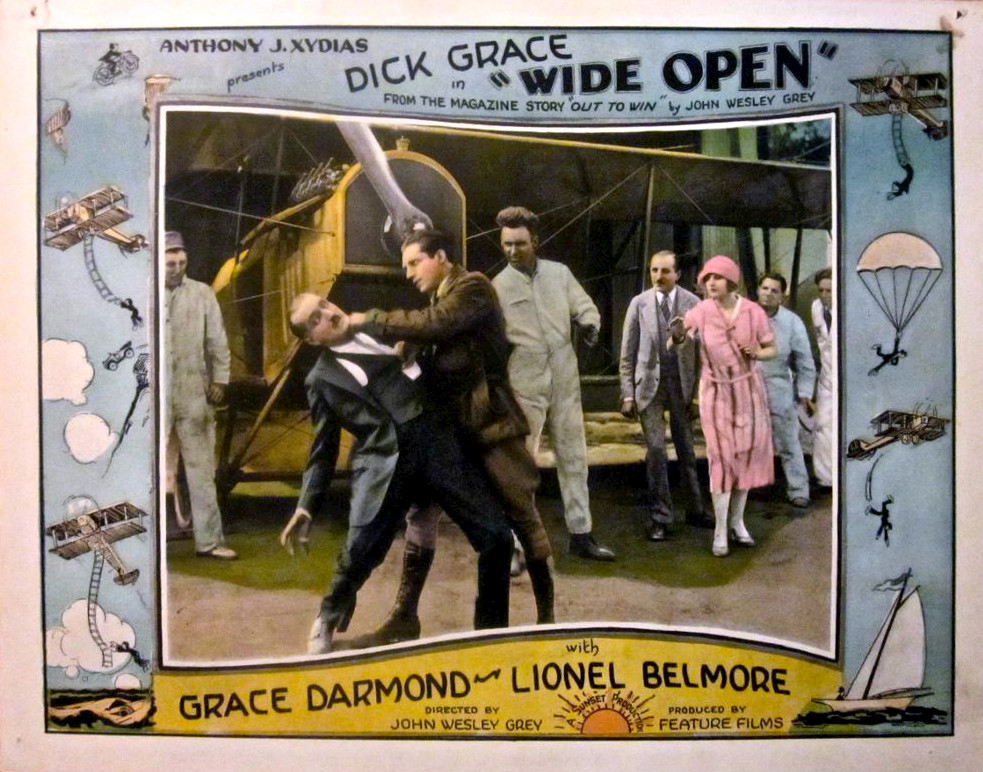
- Grace in the 1927 film "Wide Open"
- Born: Richard Virgil Grace; October 1, 1898; Morris, Minnesota, U.S.
- Died: June 25, 1965 (aged 66); Los Angeles, California, U.S.
- Occupation: Stunt Pilot
- Spouse: Crystine Francis Malstrom
- Relatives: A.G. Grace (sibling)

Richard Virgil Grace (October 1, 1898 – June 25, 1965), known as Dick Grace, was an American stunt pilot who specialized in crashing planes for films. Films that he appeared in include Sky Bride, The Lost Squadron, Lilac Time, and the first Best Picture Oscar winner Wings.

He served in both world wars, bombing Germany, as a B-17 Flying Fortress co-pilot with the 486th Bombardment Group. After the Second World War, he operated a charter business in South America. He was married to Crystine Francis Malstrom, a stage actress who appeared in Abie's Irish Rose. He was the author of several books, including Squadron of Death, Crash Pilot, I Am Still Alive, and Visibility Unlimited.

Grace sustained a serious neck injury when he fell out of the cockpit during the filming of Wings. But he made a full recovery and was one of the few stunt pilots of his day who died of natural causes.

== Filmography ==
=== as actor ===
Year	Title	Role	Notes
1926	The Flying Fool	Donald During	
1927	Wide Open	Dick Dixon	
1927	Wings	Aviator	
1928	Lilac Time	technical flight commander	
1932	The Lost Squadron	Flier	also writer

=== as writer ===
Year	Title	Notes
1936	Devil's Squadron	

=== as stunt pilot ===
Year	Title	Notes
1923	Eyes of the Forest	
1927	Wings	
1932	The Lost Squadron	
1932	Sky Bride	
