= The Man Who Played Square =

1924 film directed by Alfred Santell

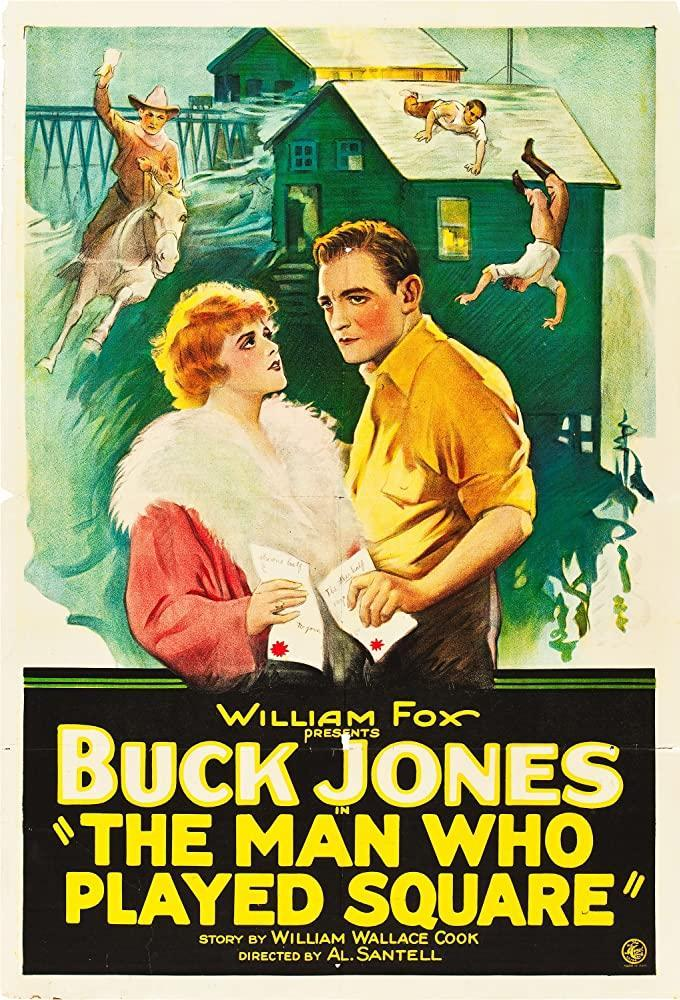
- Theatrical release poster
- Directed by: Alfred Santell
- Screenplay by: John Stone
- Story by: William Wallace Cook
- Starring: Buck Jones; Wanda Hawley; David Kirby; Ben Hendricks Jr. Hank Mann; Howard Foster
- Cinematography: Reginald Lyons
- Production company: Fox Film Corporation
- Distributed by: Fox Film Corporation
- Release date: November 23, 1924
- Running time: 70 minutes
- Country: United States
- Language: Silent (English intertitles)

The Man Who Played Square is a lost 1924 American action film directed by Alfred Santell and written by John Stone. The film stars Buck Jones, Wanda Hawley, David Kirby, Ben Hendricks Jr., Hank Mann, and Howard Foster. The film was released on November 23, 1924, by Fox Film Corporation.

== Plot ==
As described in a review in a film magazine, riding madly to his rescue, Matt (Jones) finds his buddy Steve (Scott) has been flogged and later murdered by Spofford (Foster), when Steve attempted to claim his share of the Red Eagle mine, but that Steve also got Spofford. Steve makes over his claim to Matt and has him promise to avenge him. Matt gets a job at the mine where the foreman is crooked and tries to plant stolen gold on him, but fails through the quick-wit of the cook. Piggy (Kirby), discharged for theft, lures Spofford's daughter Bertie (Hawley) into the mine and a fire occurs. Matt who has found she is not hard-hearted but merely following her father's methods, rescues her. Spangler (Hendricks) the foreman learns of Matt's claim and tries to discredit him, but Bertie refuses to believe him. A riot of the disgruntled men led by Spangler is quelled, but Spangler attacks Bertie. Matt rescues her and beats Spangler. Then, realizing he loves Bertie, he tears up his claim, but she has already read it. She tells him that she wants him to take her and the whole mine instead of half, as he had promised Steve.

== Cast ==
- Buck Jones as Matt Black
- Wanda Hawley as Bertie
- David Kirby as Piggy
- Ben Hendricks Jr. as Spangler
- Hank Mann as The Cook
- Howard Foster as Spoffard
- William Scott as Steve

== Preservation ==
With no prints of The Man Who Played Square located in any film archives, it is a lost film.
