= The Fear Market =

1920 film by Kenneth Webb

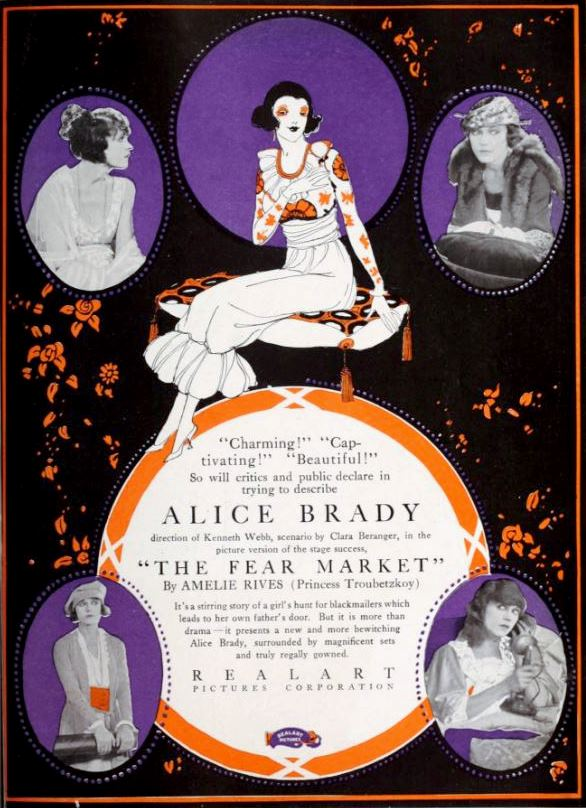
- Advertisement
- Directed by: Kenneth Webb
- Screenplay by: Clara Beranger
- Based on: The Fear Market by Amélie Rives Troubetzkoy
- Starring: Alice Brady; Frank Losee; Harry Mortimer; Richard Hatteras; Edith Stockton; Bradley Barker
- Cinematography: George J. Folsey
- Production company: Realart Pictures Corporation
- Distributed by: Realart Pictures Corporation
- Release date: January 25, 1920
- Running time: 50 minutes
- Country: United States
- Language: Silent (English intertitles)

The Fear Market is a 1920 American silent drama film directed by Kenneth Webb and written by Clara Beranger. The film stars Alice Brady, Frank Losee, Harry Mortimer, Richard Hatteras, Edith Stockton, and Bradley Barker. The film was released on January 25, 1920, by Realart Pictures Corporation.

== Cast ==
- Alice Brady as Sylvia Stone
- Frank Losee as Maj. Stone
- Harry Mortimer as Ettare Forni
- Richard Hatteras as Oliver Ellis
- Edith Stockton as Laura Hill
- Bradley Barker as Bob Sayres
- Nora Reed as Milly Sayres
- Frederick Burton as Jim Carson
- Alfred Hickman as Dicky Wilkes
- Sara Biala as Emilia Botti

== Preservation ==
With no prints of The Fear Market located in any film archives, it is considered a lost film.
