= Bab's Matinee Idol =

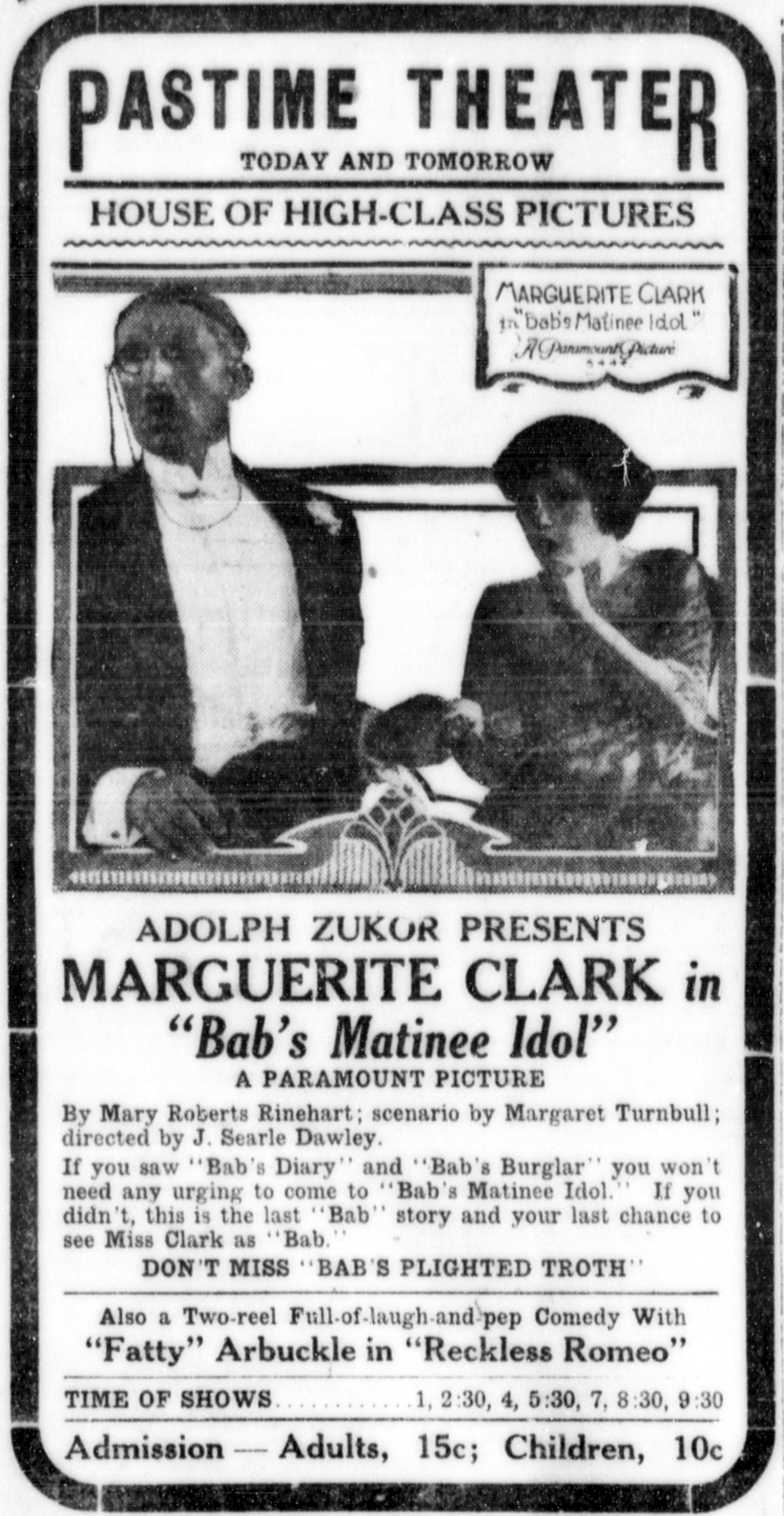
- Newspaper advertisement.
- Directed by: J. Searle Dawley
- Written by: Margaret Turnbull (scenario)
- Story by: Mary Roberts Rinehart
- Produced by: Adolph Zukor
- Starring: Marguerite Clark
- Cinematography: H. Lyman Broening
- Production company: Famous Players–Lasky
- Distributed by: Paramount Pictures
- Release date: November 26, 1917
- Running time: 5 reels (1,500 metres)
- Country: United States
- Language: Silent (English intertitles)

Bab's Matinee Idol is a 1917 American silent romantic comedy film, based on the Mary Roberts Rinehart novel Bab: a Sub-Deb, produced by Famous Players–Lasky, and directed by J. Searle Dawley. This was the final film in the trilogy of Babs films that starred Marguerite Clark.

== Plot ==
As described in a film magazine, Bab is infatuated with Adrian, an actor, and cuts his picture out of a newspaper and worships it. An epidemic of measles breaks out and Bab is sent home from boarding school. A few days later Bab learns that the play with her idol is in town, so she borrows money to see a performance with her hero. She writes him a note, and he invites her into his dressing room. She learns that unless the show gets more publicity, it will close. She arranges with budding publicist Carter Brooks and her father for Adrian to apply for work at her father's ammunition factory, and to be thrown out and the story to get into the newspapers. However, Page Beresford, who is after Bab's sister Leila's hand (and fortune), arrives at the factory to place an order for shells and, mistaken for Adrian, gets thrown out. When the real Adrian applies for work, he is hired and not allowed to leave, and misses the matinee performance. His irate wife, searching for Adrian, soon puts matters right. Bab succumbs to the measles and the revelation that Adrian is married completely shatters her thoughts of romance for the time being.

== Cast ==
- Marguerite Clark as Bab Archibald
- Helen Greene as Leila Archibald
- Isabel O'Madigan as Mrs. Archibald
- Frank Losee as Mr. Archibald
- Nigel Barrie as Carter Brooks
- William Hinckley
- Cyril Chadwick as Honorable Page Beresford
- Leone Morgan as Jane Raleigh
- Vernon Steele as Adrian Egleston
- George Odell as The Butler
- Daisy Belmore as Hannah

== Preservation status ==
All three Bab's films are now presumed lost.

== See also ==
- List of lost films
- Bab's Diary
- Bab's Burglar
