= Devil's Squadron =

1936 film by Erle C. Kenton

- Film poster
- Directed by: Erle C. Kenton
- Written by: Dick Grace; Howard J. Green; Bruce Manning; Lionel Houser
- Produced by: Robert North
- Starring: Richard Dix; Karen Morley; Lloyd Nolan
- Cinematography: John Stumar
- Edited by: John Rawlins
- Music by: Howard Jackson
- Production company: Columbia Pictures
- Distributed by: Columbia Pictures
- Release date: May 1, 1936
- Running time: 80 minutes
- Country: United States
- Language: English

Devil's Squadron is a 1936 American drama film directed by Erle C. Kenton and starring Richard Dix, Karen Morley and Lloyd Nolan. The following written prologue appears after the opening credits: "This picture is dedicated to the test pilots....those men who knowingly face death every time they leave the ground in an untried airplane. We never hear of these men, yet on their courage depends the future of aviation."

(Note: Although Devil's Squadron focused on civil aviation, the United States Army Air Corps assisted in the production.)

== Plot ==
Test pilot Paul Redmond (Richard Dix) was dishonorably discharged from the United States Marines, and needed a second chance. When he encounters Martha Dawson (Karen Morley), the daughter of an aircraft manufacturer, by chance on an airliner, he also meets Martha's father, Colonel E. J. Dawson (Boyd Irwin) and her fiancé, Dana Kirk (Lloyd Nolan). Colonel Dawson owns Dawson Aircraft Corporation, building aircraft for the U.S. Army Air Corps.

Dana and Paul are old friends and, subsequently Dana hires his friend as a new test pilot for Dawson Aircraft. During a test flight, Paul establishes a new speed record, but crash-lands. When her father dies, Martha and her brother, Ritchie (William Stelling), who is also a test pilot, take over the company operations.

During continuing test flights, many of the company's pilots are killed or injured. Ritchie is emotionally affected by the crashes, and, on the eve of his test flight, he commits suicide. Paul covers up Ritchie's suicide by flying the body in a test aircraft, setting the aircraft on fire, and parachuting out.

The investigation into the first accident that Paul caused, reveals he was discharged from the Marines for bailing out on a student flyer. The company test pilots suspect Paul did the same thing to Ritchie. Martha wants to close the company but one last test flight can still save Dawson Aircraft Corporation.

Later, Paul learns that Dana is scheduled to perform a dangerous flight test and trying to vindicate himself, Paul knocks him unconscious and performs the test himself. Watched by Army Major T. L. Metcalf (Thurston Hall), Paul wins the Air Corps contract with his flying.

Test pilot Jim Barlow (Gene Morgan) tells Dana how Paul covered up Ritchie's suicide. Martha learns that Paul had flown the tests that won the Army contract. With the truth revealed, Barlow unites Martha and Paul by skywriting, "Paul, come back to Marty!"

== Cast ==
- Richard Dix as Paul Redmond
- Karen Morley as Martha Dawson
- Lloyd Nolan as Dana Kirk
- Shirley Ross as Eunice
- Henry Mollison as Austin Forrester
- Gene Morgan as Jim Barlow
- Gordon Jones as Tex
- William Stelling as Ritchie Dawson
- Thurston Hall as Major Metcalf
- Gertrude Green as Lulu
- Boyd Irwin as Col. Dawson
- Bill Barrud as Butch
- Cora Sue Collins as Mary

== Production ==
According to a Motion Picture Herald story on Devil's Squadron, writer Dick Grace was a former noted movie stunt pilot. Principal photography on Devil's Squadron took place at the Los Angeles Metropolitan Airport and Grand Central Air Terminal in Glendale, California. The shooting began on December 17, 1935, and continued until February 2, 1936, with the film's shooting schedule including a three-week hiatus during January 1936.

Devil's Squadron was a B movie aviation thriller that, nonetheless, featured an extensive number of aircraft, including: Northrop 5B Gamma, Ryan ST, Fokker C-14, Douglas DC-2, Garland-Lincoln LF-1, Brown B2 and Fairchild 71.

== Reception ==
The contemporary film review in The New York Times, noted, "That unsung hero of the airplane industry, the test pilot, has his somewhat grisly hour or so this week at the Globe Theatre in 'Devil's Squadron', a film distinguished by some excellent shots of stunt flying and an accompanying romance which does not run off at the deep end."

Aviation film historian Stephen Pendo, in Aviation in the Cinema (1985) noted Devil's Squadron promoted "... the theory that these test pilots are merely human guinea pigs for designers' sometimes unsafe modifications.".

Aviation film historian James Farmer in Celluloid Wings: The Impact of Movies on Aviation (1984) considered Devil's Squadron, a "... superior "second-bill" air thriller."
