= Frederick Burton (actor) =

American actor (1871–1957)

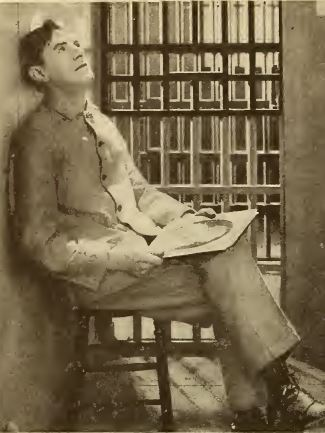
- Burton in Heliotrope, 1920
- Born: October 20, 1871; Gosport, Indiana, U.S.
- Died: October 23, 1957 (aged 86); Woodland Hills, Los Angeles, California, U.S.
- Occupation: film actor
- Years active: 1914–1947
- Spouse: Jessie Lawrie

Frederick Burton (October 20, 1871 – October 23, 1957) was an American actor. He appeared in 122 films between 1914 and 1947. Burton was born in Gosport, Indiana and died in Woodland Hills, Los Angeles.

== Life and career ==
The following comes from a 1907 issue of Life Magazine:

FREDERICK BURTON, the actor, hails from Gosport, Ind. He got his start on the stage after making a hit in a Knights of Pythias benefit in Gosport. After three years' absence from home, his company played in Terre Haute and Burton invited his father to come over and see him act. The old man took in the show, and after the last curtain went back on the stage to see his son. Presently the treasurer appeared at the dressing room door and handed Burton his weekly pay envelope. Burton senior saw the figures on the outside and his eyes sparkled.

"You don't mean to tell me you get that much every week, do you?" exclaimed the old gentleman. "That's right," Burton replied, modestly.

"Well, what other chores do you have to do besides actin'?" the old man asked. — Harper's Weekly.

Burton was known on the stage for his portrayal of rural Americans and would return to his family farm in Gosport every summer to reacquaint himself with the land.

In 1913, Burton, along with Sydney Shields, starred in Reckless Age, a play produced by Cecil B. De Mille shortly before he switched to film. He appeared in over 120 films between 1914 and 1944, mostly playing supporting and bit parts.

== Partial filmography ==
- The Career of Katherine Bush (1919)
- The Fear Market (1920)
- Yes or No? (1920)
- The Education of Elizabeth (1921) - Middleton
- Bits of Life (1921)
- If Women Only Knew (1921)
- The Man She Brought Back (1922)
- Broadway Broke (1923)
- The Rejected Woman (1924)
- Back to Life (1925)
- So's Your Old Man (1926)
- Running Wild (1927)
- The Big Trail (1930)
- Freighters of Destiny (1931)
- One Way Passage (1932)
- The Night of June 13 (1932) (uncredited)
- Too Busy to Work (1932)
- No Other Woman (1933)
- Bedside (1934)
- Love Birds (1934)
- Theodora Goes Wild (1936)
- Fury (1936) as Judge Daniel Hopkins (uncredited)
- The Saint in New York (1938)
- Flight to Fame (1938)
- Inside Information (1939)
- Hollywood Cavalcade (1939)
- Go West (1940) as Johnson (uncredited)
- The Man Who Lost Himself (1941)
- Miss Susie Slagle's (1946)
