= The Lottery Man (1919 film) =

1919 film by James Cruze

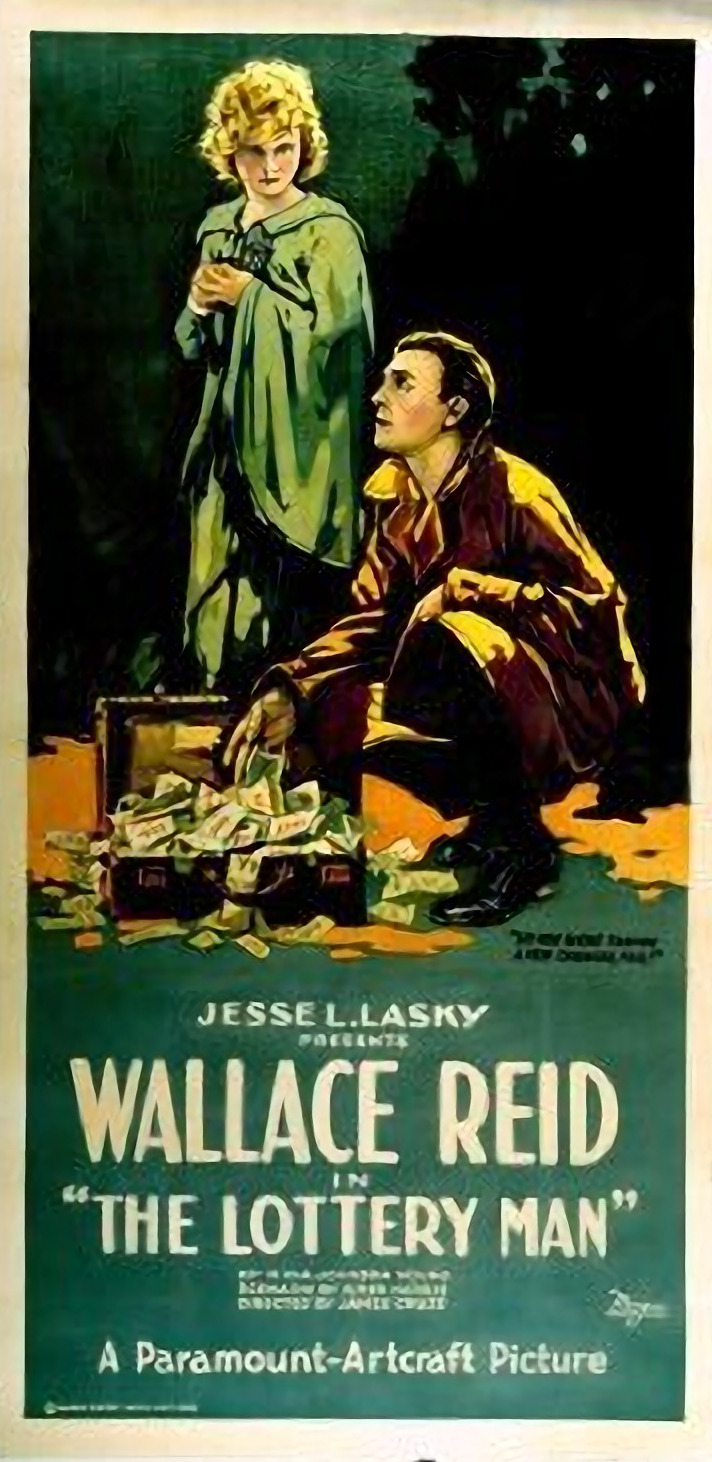
- Movie poster
- Directed by: James Cruze
- Written by: Elmer Harris (scenario); Frank Urson (adaptation)
- Based on: The Lottery Man by Rida Johnson Young
- Produced by: Adolph Zukor; Jesse Lasky
- Starring: Wallace Reid; Wanda Hawley
- Cinematography: Frank Urson
- Distributed by: Paramount Pictures
- Release date: October 12, 1919
- Running time: 50 minutes; 5 reels
- Country: United States
- Language: Silent (English intertitles)

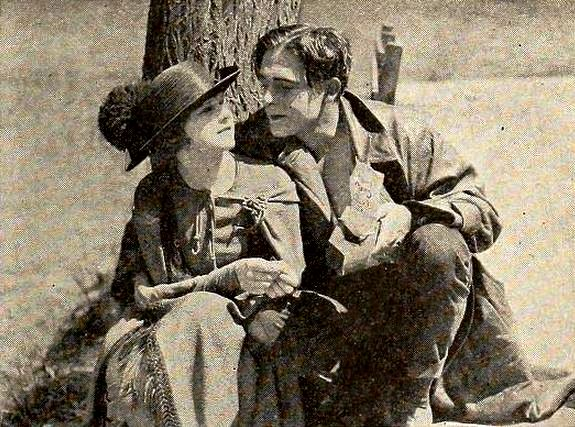
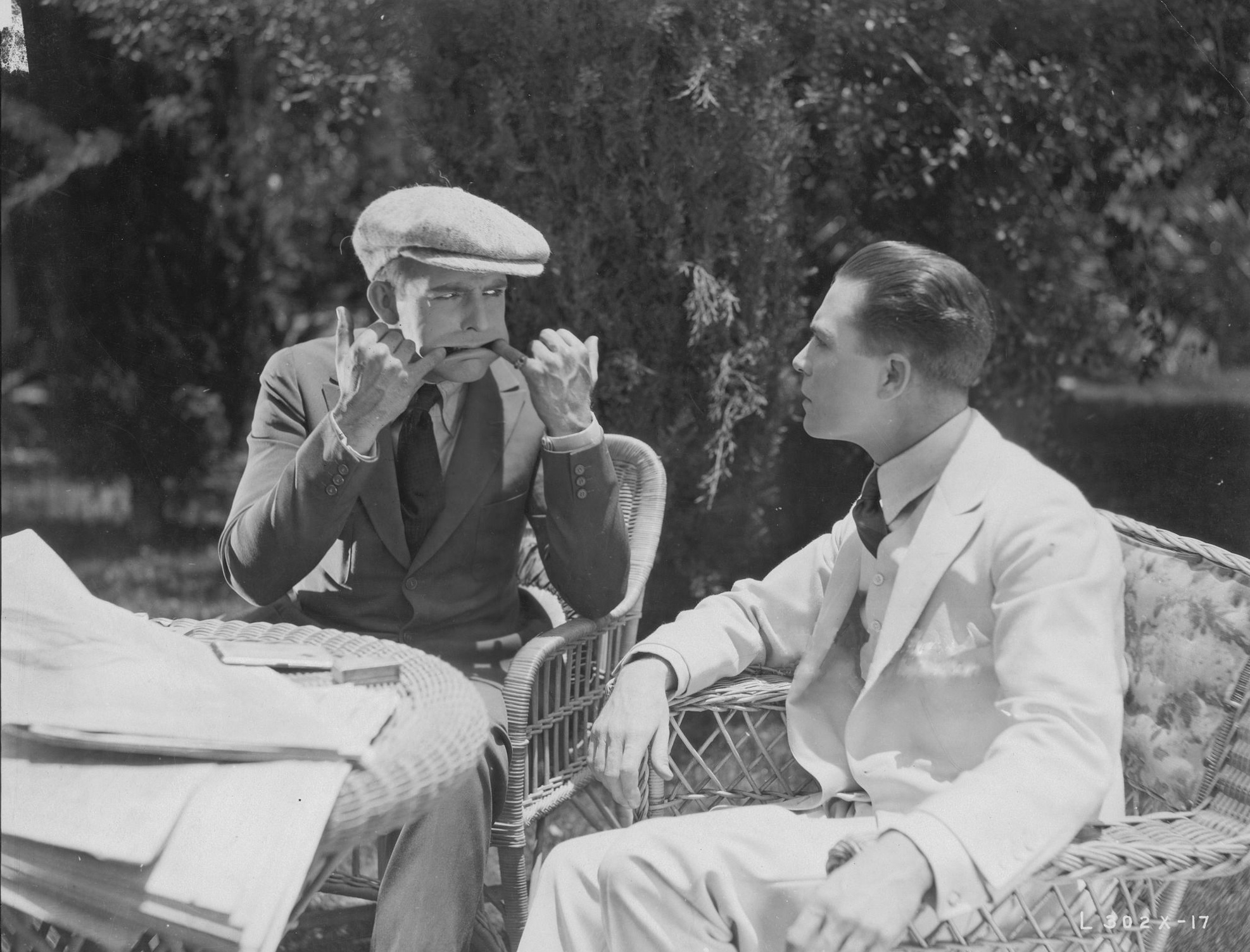
Wanda Hawley and Wallace Reid (left) and Wallace Reid and Harrison Ford (right)

The Lottery Man is a 1919 American silent comedy film directed by James Cruze and starring Wallace Reid and Wanda Hawley.

It is based on a 1909 Broadway play, The Lottery Man, by Rida Johnson Young. In the play Cyril Scott and Janet Beecher played the roles that Reid and Hawley play in the film. Famous Players–Lasky produced and Paramount Pictures distributed.

An earlier film adaptation of the play was produced in 1916. That film is extant.

== Cast ==
- Wallace Reid as Jack Wright
- Harrison Ford as Foxhall Peyton
- Wanda Hawley as Helen Heyer
- Fanny Midgley as Mrs. Wright
- Sylvia Ashton as Mrs. Peyton
- Caroline Rankin as Lizzie Roberts
- Wilton Taylor as McGuire
- Clarence Geldart as Business Manager
- Marcia Manon as Nora
- Winifred Greenwood as Hewig Jensen
- Fred Huntley as Hamilton
- Lila Lee as Polly
- Tully Marshall (uncredited)
- Charles Stanton Ogle (uncredited)
- Guy Oliver (uncredited)
- Virginia Foltz (uncredited)

== Preservation ==
In February of 2021, The Lottery Man was cited by the National Film Preservation Board on their Lost U.S. Silent Feature Films list and is therefore presumed lost.

== See also ==
- Wallace Reid filmography
