= A Prince There Was =

1921 film

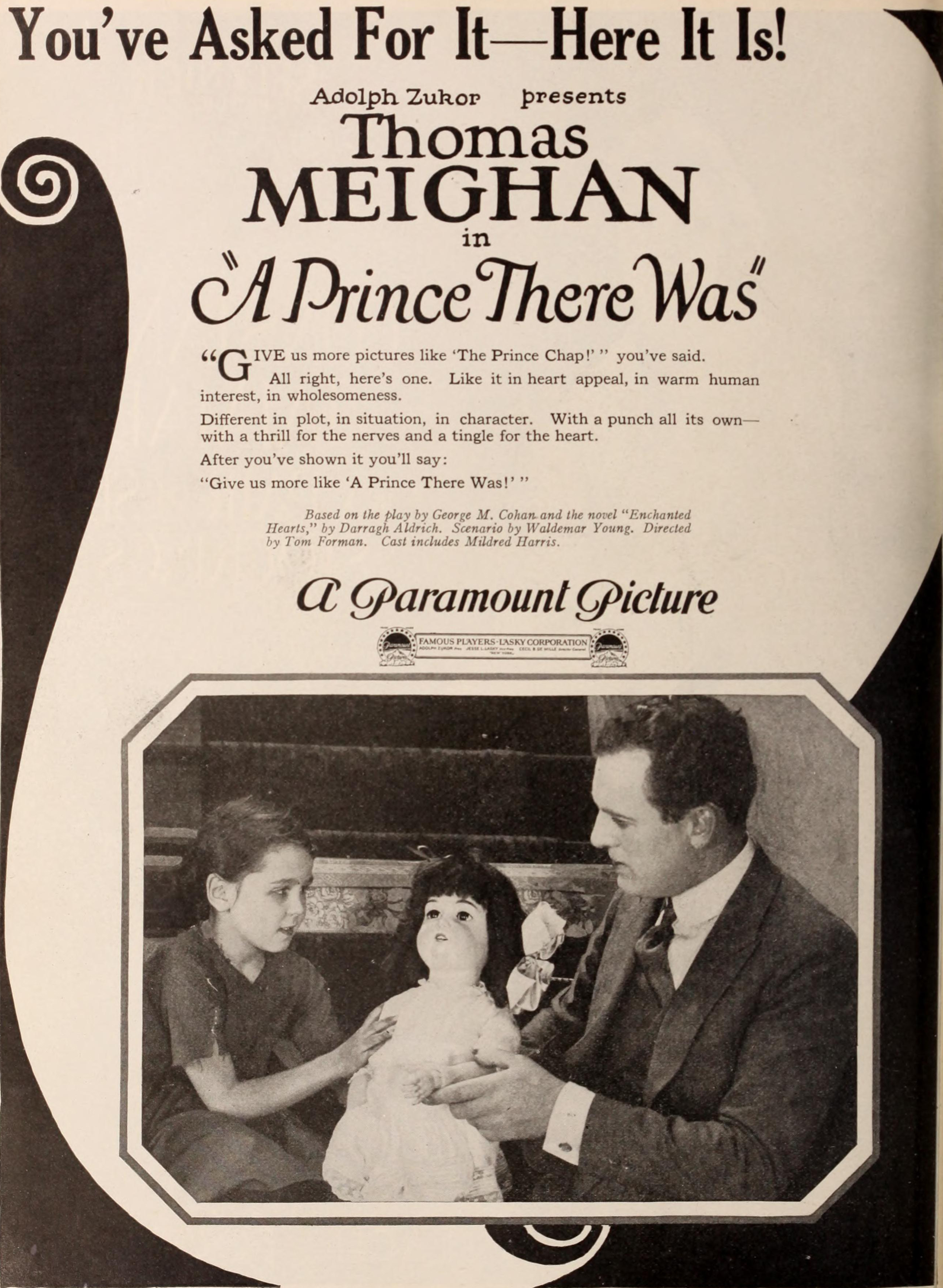
- Advertisement
- Directed by: Tom Forman
- Screenplay by: Waldemar Young
- Based on: Enchanted Hearts (novel) by Darragh Aldrich A Prince There Was (play) by George M. Cohan
- Starring: Thomas Meighan; Mildred Harris; Charlotte Jackson; Nigel Barrie
- Cinematography: Harry Perry
- Production company: Famous Players–Lasky Corporation
- Distributed by: Paramount Pictures
- Release date: November 13, 1921
- Running time: 60 minutes
- Country: United States
- Language: Silent (English intertitles)

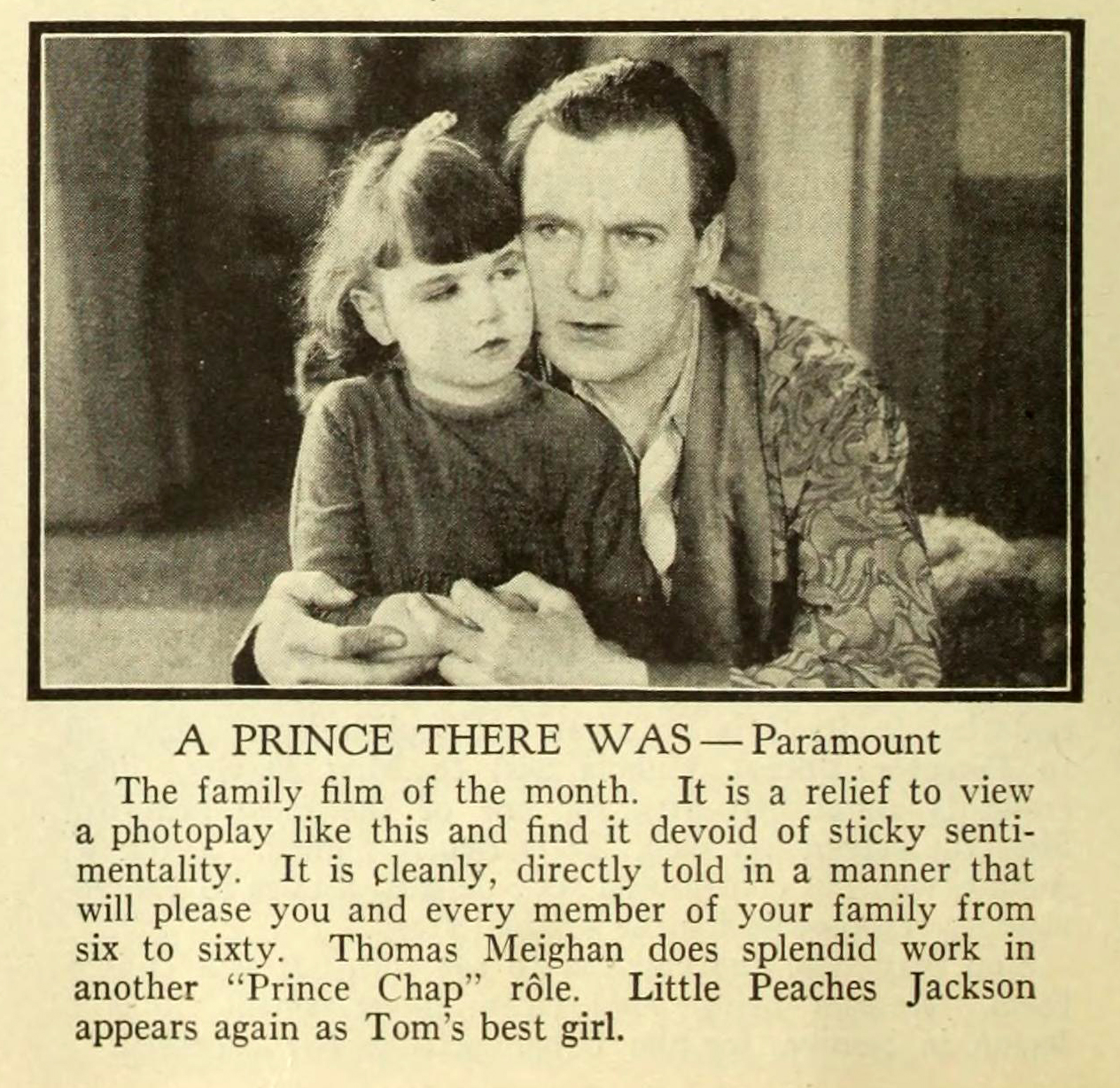
Film still and caption in Photoplay (1922)

A Prince There Was is a lost 1921 American silent drama film directed by Tom Forman and written by Waldemar Young based upon the film is based on the novel Enchanted Hearts by Darragh Aldrich and the play by George M. Cohan. The film stars Thomas Meighan, Mildred Harris, Charlotte Jackson, Nigel Barrie, Guy Oliver, Arthur Stuart Hull, and Sylvia Ashton. The film was released on November 13, 1921, by Paramount Pictures.

== Plot ==
As described in a film magazine, wealthy Charles Edward Martin has been leading a shiftless, luxurious life and takes no interest in himself or others until a little boarding house drudge, who sleeps under the stairs there and where she can hear the comings and goings of the residents, calls on him to seek his aid for a struggling young woman novelist, Katherine Woods, who lives there. The young millionaire had previously been urged to take the position as assistant editor of a popular magazine, but had declined, preferring a sodden life.

The earnestness of the girl interests him and, more as an exploit than an ambition, he undertakes playing "fairy prince" to the novelist. He moves into the boarding house, where there are several humorous character sketches, and almost immediately falls in love with Katherine. He assumes the name Prince, and the novelist does not recognize him as the man whose money drove her father into financial ruin and suicide. She gives "Prince" the manuscript of a novel which he buys immediately. Charles then hastens to his magazine publisher friend Jack Carruthers to get it printed. Jack tells him that the magazine had already seen it and declined to publish the novel.

Remembering the hope in Katherine's eyes when he pretended to buy the novel, Charles purchases the entire magazine publishing establishment, much to the consternation of his broker, J.J. Stratton. It turns out that the rather unscrupulous broker had manipulated Charles' funds so as to ruin Katherine's father without his client's knowledge.

== Cast ==
- Thomas Meighan as Charles Edward Martin
- Mildred Harris as Katherine Woods
- Charlotte Jackson as Comfort Brown
- Nigel Barrie as Jack Carruthers
- Guy Oliver as Bland
- Arthur Stuart Hull as J.J. Stratton
- Sylvia Ashton as Mrs. Prouty
- Fred Huntley as Mr. Cricket
- Peaches Jackson as Little Girl
