= Fires of Fate (1923 film) =

1923 film

- Directed by: Tom Terriss
- Based on: Play Fires of Fate by Arthur Conan Doyle; Novel The Tragedy of the Korosko by Arthur Conan Doyle (1898)
- Starring: Wanda Hawley, Nigel Barrie, Pedro de Cordoba, and others
- Release date: 1923
- Countries: United Kingdom, United States
- Language: Silent film (English intertitles)

Fires of Fate is a 1923 British-American silent adventure film directed by Tom Terriss and starring Wanda Hawley, Nigel Barrie and Pedro de Cordoba. It was adapted from the 1909 play Fires of Fate by Arthur Conan Doyle which was in turn based on his 1898 novel The Tragedy of the Korosko. The version released in the United States is known as Desert Sheik.

== Cast ==
- Wanda Hawley as Dorinne Adams
- Nigel Barrie as Col. Egerton
- Pedro de Cordoba as Prince Ibrahim
- Stewart Rome as Rev. Samuel Rodin
- Edith Craig as Miss Adams
- Percy Standing as Stephen Belmont
- Arthur M. Cullin as Sir Charles Rodin
- Douglas Munro as Mansoor
- Cyril Smith as Lord Howard Cecil
