= The Tragedy of the Korosko =

1898 novel by Arthur Conan Doyle

- First edition (publ. Smith, Elder & Co.)
- Author: Arthur Conan Doyle
- Language: English
- Publication date: 1898

The Tragedy of the Korosko (1898) is a novel by Sir Arthur Conan Doyle. It was serialized a year earlier in The Strand magazine between May and December 1897, and was later turned into a 1909 play Fires of Fate.

== Plot summary ==
A group of European tourists are enjoying their trip to Egypt in the year 1895. They are sailing up the River Nile in "a turtle-bottomed, round-bowed stern-wheeler", the Korosko. They intend to travel to Abousir at the southern frontier of Egypt, after which the Dervish country starts. They are attacked and abducted by a marauding band of Dervish warriors. The novel contains a strong defence of British Imperialism and in particular the Imperial project in North Africa. It also reveals the very great suspicion of Islam felt by many Europeans at the time of the Mahdist War.

== Fires of Fate ==
Doyle later adapted his novel into a 1909 play Fires of Fate. The play was in turn twice adapted into films; a 1923 silent film and a 1932 talkie.

== See also ==
- In Desert and Wilderness (with a similar theme)
