= A Woman of Impulse =

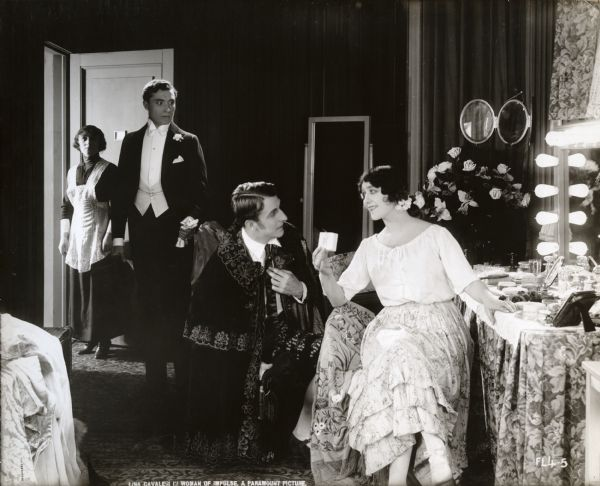
- Still with Raymond Bloomer and Lina Cavalieri while Robert Cain watches in the background
- Directed by: Edward José
- Screenplay by: Eve Unsell
- Based on: A Woman of Impulse by Louis K. Anspacher
- Produced by: Adolph Zukor
- Starring: Lina Cavalieri; Gertrude Robinson; Raymond Bloomer; Robert Cain; Clarence Handyside; Mathilde Brundage
- Cinematography: Hal Young
- Production company: Famous Players–Lasky Corporation
- Distributed by: Paramount Pictures
- Release date: October 20, 1918
- Running time: 50 minutes
- Country: United States
- Language: Silent (English intertitles)

A Woman of Impulse is a 1918 American silent drama film directed by Edward José and written by Eve Unsell based upon the play of the same name by Louis K. Anspacher. The film stars Lina Cavalieri, Gertrude Robinson, Raymond Bloomer, Robert Cain, Clarence Handyside, and Mathilde Brundage. The film was released on October 20, 1918, by Paramount Pictures.

== Plot ==
As described in a film magazine, Leonora, a poor lace maker, is given a musical education by Mr. and Mrs. Stuart, a wealthy American family, and soon becomes a prima donna. The Spanish Count Nerval falls in love and marries her, but she refuses to give up her career. En route to America, her sister Nina meets a young American Dr. Paul Spencer, and, although in love with him, she becomes enamored with Phillip Gardiner, the son of a wealthy New Orleans family. They are all invited to visit to the Gardiner's in New Orleans, and there the Count becomes jealous of Leonora, thinking that an old affair with Phillip has been renewed. Phillip is found dead in the garden by the Count, having been stabbed with Leonora's jeweled dagger, and Leonora is suspected of the crime. The confession by the Creole servant Cleo clears matters up, and Nina is happy in the doctor's arms while the Count swears to never doubt his wife again.

== Cast ==
- Lina Cavalieri as Leonora, 'La Vecci'
- Gertrude Robinson as Nina
- Raymond Bloomer as Count Nerval
- Robert Cain as Phillip Gardiner
- Clarence Handyside as Mr. Stuart
- Mathilde Brundage as Mrs. Stuart
- Leslie Austin as Dr. Paul Spencer
- Corene Uzzell as Cleo
- Lucien Muratore
- Estar Banks

== Reception ==
Variety's review was mostly positive, giving the direction, photography, and scenery a pass, but the reviewer had exceptional praise for the supporting cast.

== Censorship ==
Like many American films of the time, A Woman of Impulse was subject to cuts by city and state film censorship boards. For example, the Chicago Board of Censors required a cut, in Reel 5, of the actual stabbing in the vision scene.
