= Lina Cavalieri =

Italian operatic soprano (1874–1944)

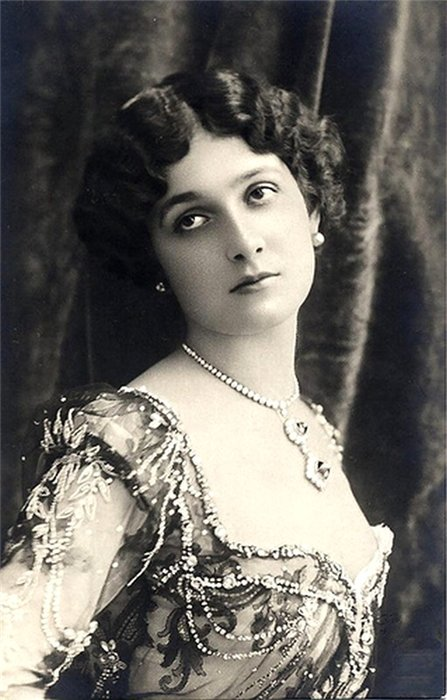
- Lina Cavalieri, c. 1900
- Born: Natalina Cavalieri; 25 December 1874; Viterbo, Kingdom of Italy
- Died: 7 February 1944 (aged 69); Florence, Kingdom of Italy
- Occupations: Opera singer (dramatic soprano); actress; monologist
- Spouse(s): Alexandre Bariatinsky (relationship 1899–1900); Robert Winthrop Chanler (m. 1910–1912; divorced); Lucien Muratore (m. 1913–1927); Paolo d'Arvanni (m. 19??—1944; their deaths)
- Children: Alexandre Bariatinsky, Jr.

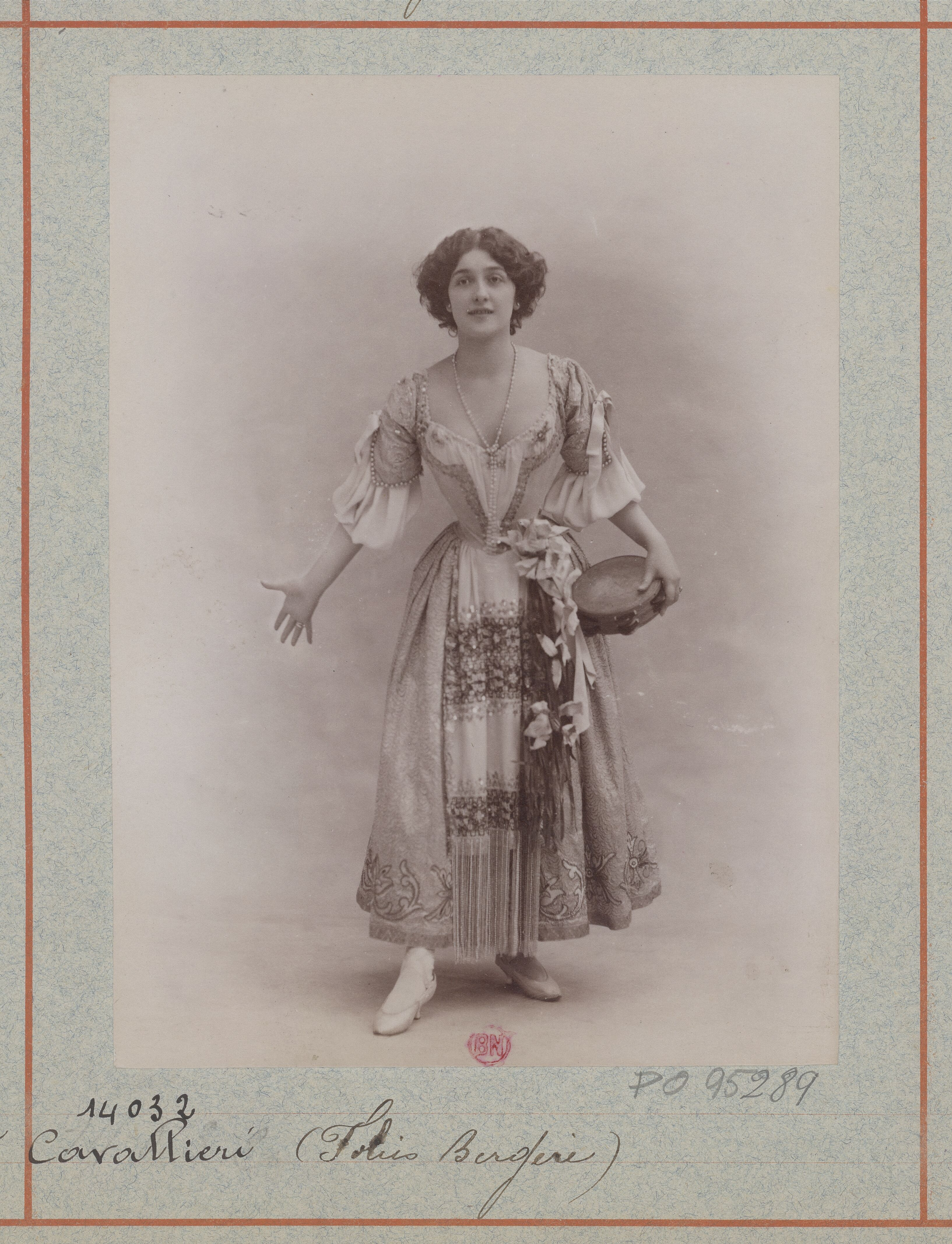
Lina Cavalieri, Folies Bergère (a café-concert) c. 1890

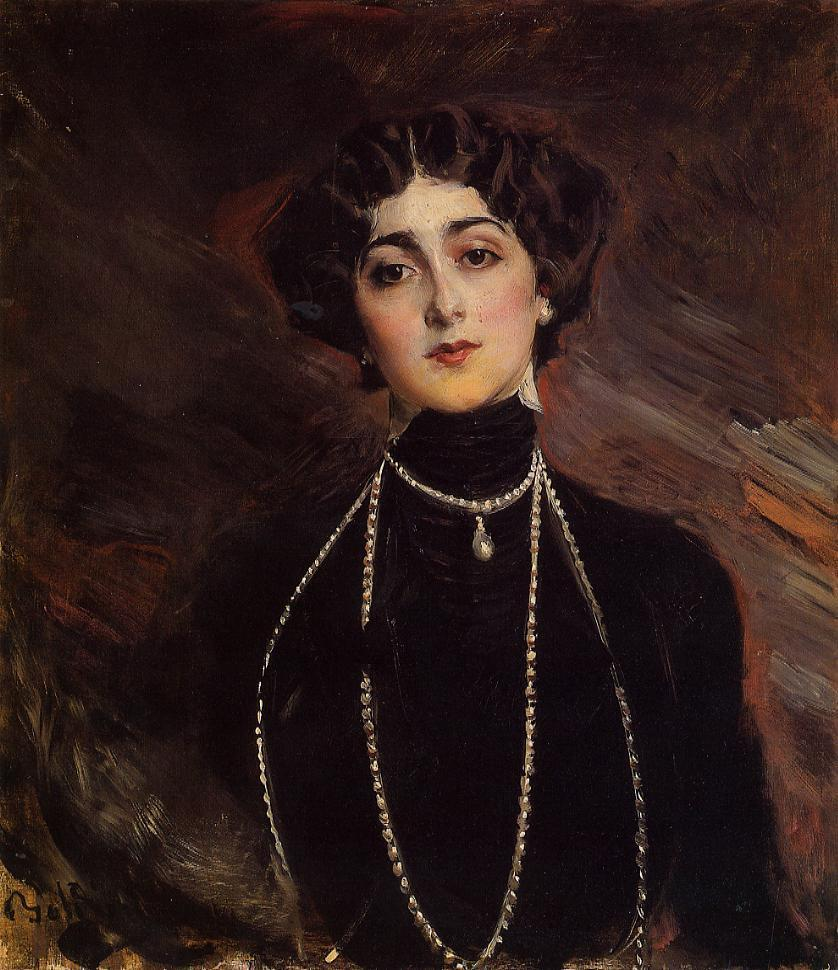
Lina Cavalieri, as painted by Giovanni Boldini (c. 1901)

Natalina "Lina" Cavalieri (25 December 1874 – 7 February 1944) was an Italian operatic dramatic soprano, actress, and monologist.

== Biography ==
Lina Cavalieri was born on Christmas Day at Viterbo, some 80 kilometres (50 mi) north of Rome. She lost her parents at the age of fifteen and became a ward of the state, sent to live in a Roman Catholic orphanage. The vivacious young girl was unhappy under the strict discipline of the nuns, and at the first opportunity, she ran away with a touring theatrical group.

At a young age, she made her way to Paris, France, where her appearance opened doors and she obtained work as a singer at one of the city's café-concerts. From there, she performed at a variety of music halls and other such venues around Europe, while still working to develop her voice. She took voice lessons and made her opera debut in Lisbon, Portugal, in 1900 (as Nedda in Pagliacci). The Russian Prince Alexander Bariatinsky was deeply in love with Lina, and they had an open affair, but never became husband and wife as his parents and Tsar Nicholas II himself strongly opposed this marriage. In 1904, she sang at the Opéra de Monte-Carlo then in 1905, at the Sarah Bernhardt Theatre in Paris, Cavalieri starred opposite Enrico Caruso in the Umberto Giordano opera Fedora. From there, she and Caruso took the opera to New York City, debuting with it at the Metropolitan Opera on 5 December 1906.

Cavalieri remained with the Metropolitan Opera for the next two seasons, performing again with Caruso in 1907, in Puccini's Manon Lescaut. She became one of the most photographed stars of her time. Frequently referred to as the "world's most beautiful woman", she was part of the tightlacing tradition that saw women use corsetry to create an "hour-glass" figure.

During the 1909–10 season, she sang with Oscar Hammerstein's Manhattan Opera Company. Her first marriage long over, she had a whirlwind romance with Robert Winthrop Chanler (1872–1930), a member of the Astor family and Dudley–Winthrop family. They married on 18 June 1910 but separated by the end of their honeymoon, and their divorce became final in June 1912.

After the divorce, Cavalieri returned to Europe, where she became a much-loved star in pre-revolutionary St. Petersburg, Russia. Other operas in her repertoire included La bohème, La traviata, Faust, Manon, Andrea Chénier, Thaïs, Les contes d'Hoffmann (as the courtesan Giulietta), Rigoletto, Mefistofele (as both Margarita and Elena), Adriana Lecouvreur, Tosca, Hérodiade (as Salomé), Carmen (the title role), Siberia, and Zazà.

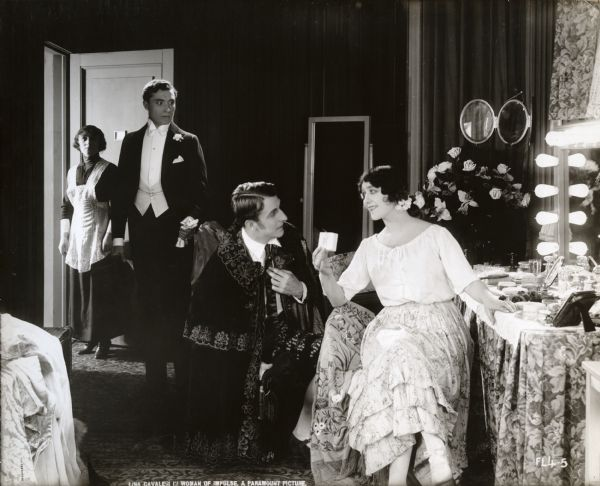
A scene in the silent drama A Woman of Impulse, with Lina Cavalieri, Raymond Bloomer (on one knee) and Robert Cain.

During her career, Cavalieri sang with other prominent singers, including Giuseppe Anselmi, Mary Garden (the world premiere of Massenet's Chérubin, 1905), Mattia Battistini, Titta Ruffo, Feodor Chaliapin, Nikolay Figner, Antonio Scotti, Vanni Marcoux, Giovanni Zenatello, Tito Schipa, and the French tenor Lucien Muratore, whom she married in 1913 after his divorce from soprano Marguerite Bériza. After retiring from the stage, Cavalieri ran a cosmetic salon in Paris. In 1914, on the eve of her fortieth birthday – her beauty still spectacular – she wrote an advice column on make-up for women in Femina magazine and published a book, My Secrets of Beauty. In her Parisian Institut de Beauté, she licensed Parfums Isabey Paris and not only sold Isabey perfumes, but also developed in 1926 a range of beauty products. The same year, she launched her own perfume, called "Mona Lina", apparently inspired by Leonardo da Vinci's Mona Lisa. In 1915, she returned to her native Italy to make motion pictures.

When that country became involved in World War I, she went to the United States, where she made four more silent films. The last three of her films were the product of her friend, the film director Edward José. Almost all of her films are considered lost.

After marrying her fourth husband, Paolo d'Arvanni, she returned to live with her husband in Italy. Well into her sixties when World War II began, she nevertheless worked as a volunteer nurse.

Cavalieri was killed on 7 February 1944 during an Allied bombing raid that destroyed her home in Florence near Poggio Imperiale, where she had been placed under police surveillance because of her foreign husband. Hearing an American bomber nearby, Cavalieri, her husband, and their servants ran to the air-raid shelter in the grounds. However, she and her husband were delayed because they were collecting her valuable jewellery from the house and both were killed on their way to the shelter, while the servants already inside it all survived.

== Legacy ==
Lina Cavalieri's discography is rather slim. In 1910, for Columbia, she recorded arias from La bohème, Tosca, Manon Lescaut, Carmen, Mefistofele, and Faust, as well as "Maria, Marì! (Ah! Marì! Ah! Marì!)." In 1913, also for Columbia, she recorded Italian songs. In 1918, for Pathé, the soprano recorded two songs, the aria from Hérodiade, and three duets with Muratore.

Her portrait was painted by the Italian artist Giovanni Boldini (acquired by Maurice de Rothschild) and by the Swiss-born American artist Adolfo Müller-Ury. The latter painting is now the property of the Metropolitan Opera, the gift of Nicholas Meredith Turner in memory of his wife, the soprano Jessica Dragonette. Hers is the inspiring beauty that appears in several works by Piero Fornasetti.

In 1955, Gina Lollobrigida portrayed Cavalieri in a movie of Cavalieri's life, Beautiful But Dangerous (also known as The World's Most Beautiful Woman). In 2004, a book was published, written by Paul Fryer and Olga Usova, titled Lina Cavalieri: The Life of Opera’s Greatest Beauty, 1874–1944.

== Family ==
From her relationship to Alexandre Bariatinsky, Lina had one son, Alexandre Bariatinsky, Jr. He was serving in the Italian Army early in WW1 when she went to the authorities trying to find him.

== Films ==
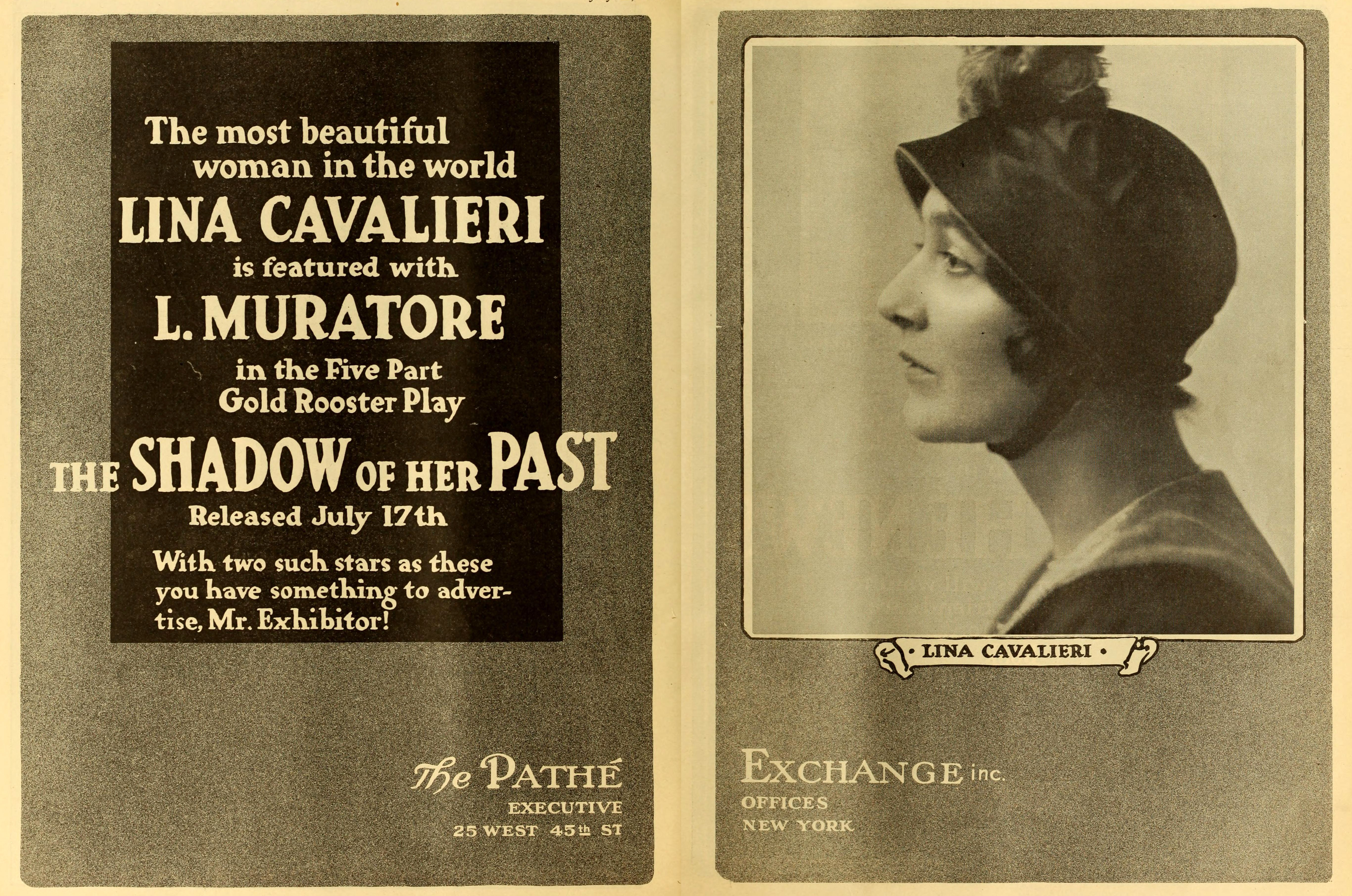
The Shadow of Her Past (1916)

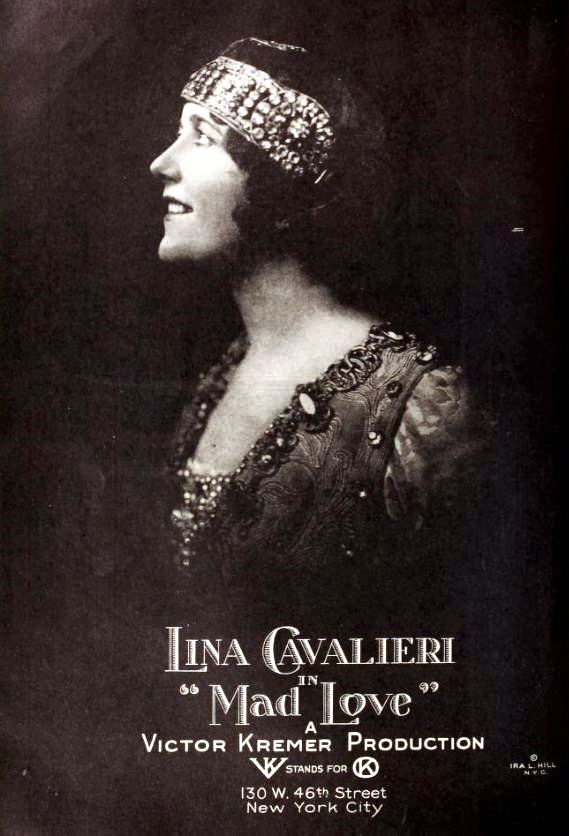
Advertisement for Mad Love

- Manon Lescaut (1914)
- The Shadow of Her Past (1915)
- The Rose of Granada (1916)
- The Eternal Temptress (1917)
- Love's Conquest (1918)
- A Woman of Impulse (1918)
- The Two Brides (1919)
- The Crushed Idol (1920)
- Mad Love (1920)

== Iconography ==
- Antonio de La Gandara – Portrait of Lina Cavalieri
- Piero Fornasetti – 'Tema e Variazioni' series

== Bibliography ==
- Bianchi, Piero (1969). Francesca Bertini e le dive del cinema muto. Turin: UTET.
- Martin-Hattemberg, Jean-Marie (2014). Isabey Paris, Parfumeur depuis 1924. Paris: Gourcuff Gradenigo.
- Lina Cavalieri, Le mie verità, redatte da Paolo D'Arvanni, Roma, Soc. An. Poligr. Italiana, 1936;
- Vincenzo De Angelis, Lina Cavalieri e Gabriele D'Annunzio, Roma, Fratelli Palombi, 1955;
- Vittorio Martinelli, L'avventura cinematografica di Lina Cavalieri, S.l., s.n., 1986;
- Franco Di Tizio, Lina Cavalieri, la donna più bella del mondo. La vita 1875-1944, prefazione di Dacia Maraini, Chieti, Ianieri, 2004.
- Lucia Fusco, Storie di donne che hanno fatto la storia: Lina Cavalieri, Nuova Informazione, Lt, A. XXIII, n. 12, pp.302–303, dicembre 2017.
- Franco Di Tizio, Lina Cavalieri "Massima testimonianza di Venere in Terra", Pescara, Ianieri, 2019.
- Fryer, Paul, and Olga Usova. Lina Cavalieri: The Life of Opera's Greatest Beauty, 1874-1944. McFarland, 2003.
