= Germaine Bailac =

French mezzo-soprano opera singer (1881–1977)

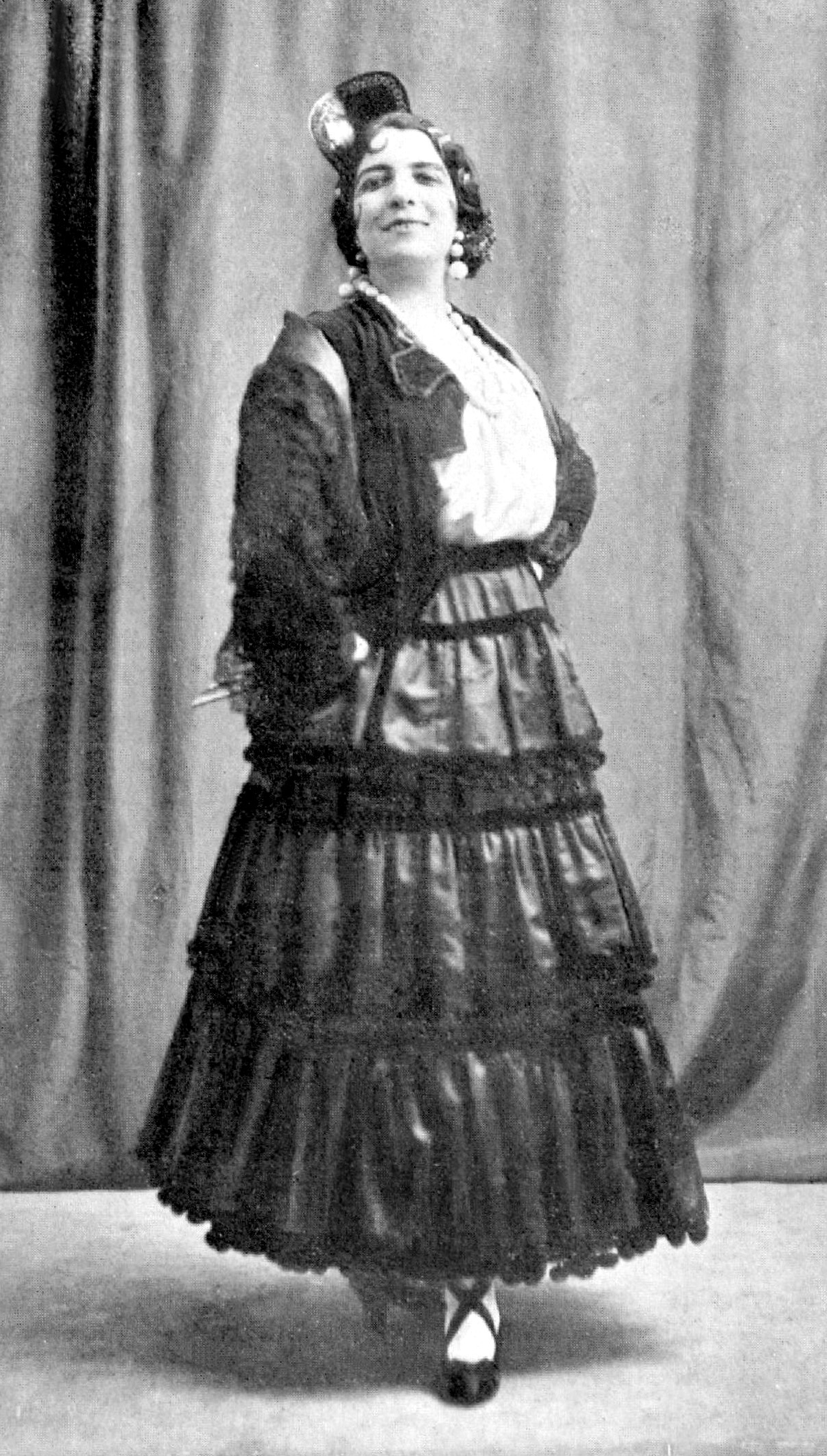
- Bailac as Bizet's Carmen, published in 1916
- Born: 28 March 1881; Toulouse, France
- Died: 12 October 1977 (aged 96); Paris, France
- Education: Conservatoire de Toulouse; Conservatoire de Paris
- Occupations: Operatic mezzo-soprano; Operatic contralto; Academic teacher
- Organizations: Paris Opera; Opéra-Comique; Opéra de Monte-Carlo; Conservatoire de Toulouse

Jeanne Albertine Germaine Bailac de Boria (28 March 1881 – 12 October 1977) was a French mezzo-soprano opera singer and voice teacher. After studying at the Toulouse and Paris conservatoires, she made her début at the Paris Opera in August 1907 in the title role of Samson et Dalila. In May 1908, she performed in the world premiere of Isaac de Camondo's Le Clown at the Opéra-Comique. She subsequently appeared in various roles, in particular Bizet's Carmen, in Paris and the provinces. In later life she taught voice at the Toulouse Conservatoire.

== Early life ==
Born in Toulouse on 28 March 1881, Jeanne Albertine Germaine Bailac was the daughter of the Spanish-born violinist Frédéric Bailac and his Algerian-born wife Adelaïde Clotilde Armand. She studied the piano for many years before developing her voice. After Pedro Gailhard heard her singing at a recital in Biarritz around 1902, he advised her to attend the Conservatoire de Toulouse. She continued her voice training at the Conservatoire de Paris.

== Career ==
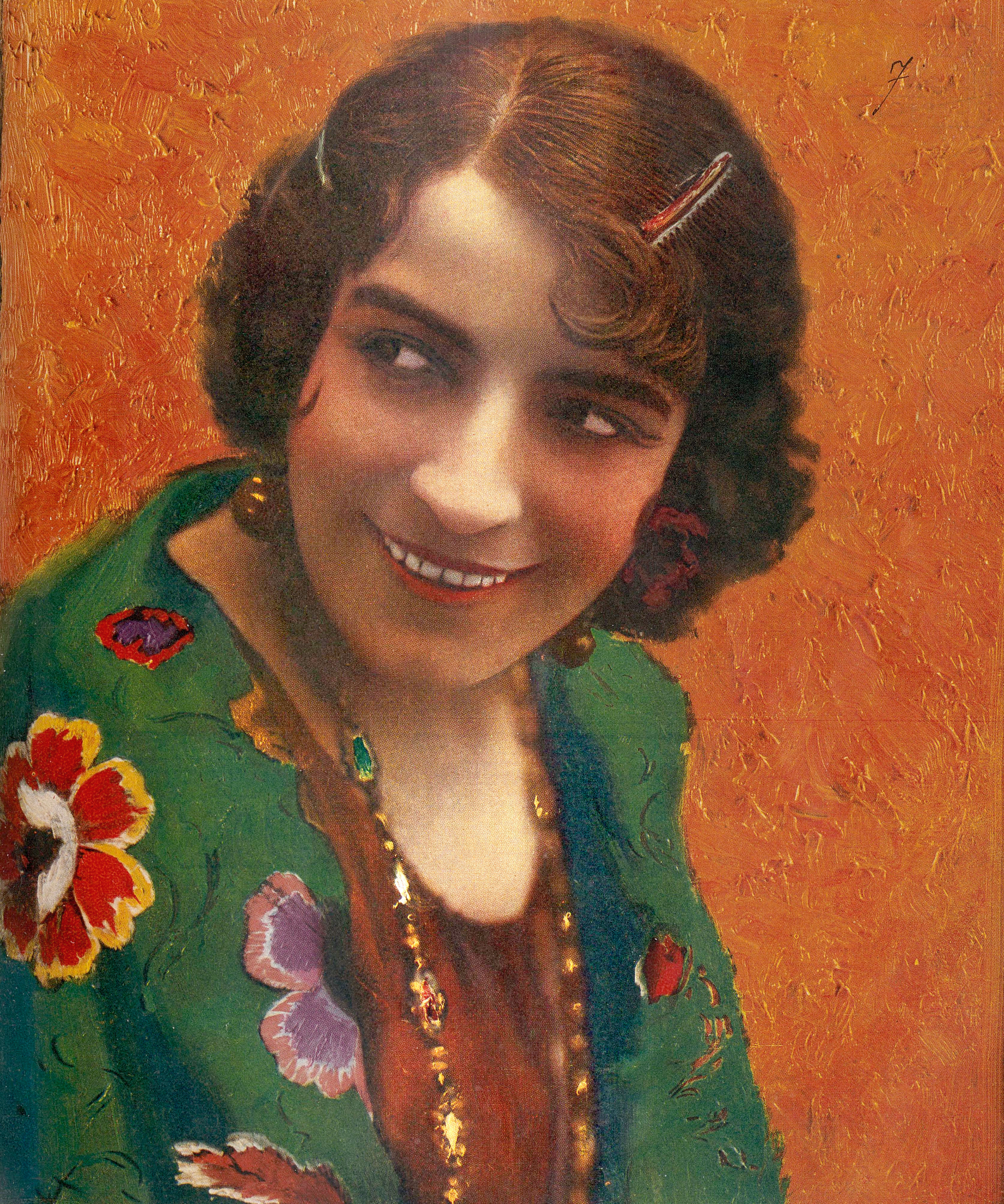
Bailac, from the cover of Comœdia illustré (1913)

Shortly after winning the first prize at the Opéra-Comique, she was engaged by Gailhard of the Paris Opera to sing the title role in Samson et Dalila by Saint-Saëns in August 1907. Her début received enthusiastic support, both for her voice and her performance as a dramatic actress. She was immediately considered to be among the most competent contraltos. In 1911, she appeared at the Opéra de Monte-Carlo in the premiere of the last opera by Saint-Saëns, Déjanire. She created the role of Phenice, giving a "remarkable performance".

From May 1908, Bailac sang at the Opéra-Comique. Making a successful début in Isaac de Camondo's Clown, she went on to take the title role in Bizet's Carmen, Charlotte in Gounod's Werther, Margared in Lalo's Le roi d'Ys and Madame de la Haltère in Massenet's Cendrillon. She later performed in operas at Vichy's Grand Casino and in other provincial venues. She spent the last twenty years of her singing career at the Monte Carlo Opera.

Bailac retired from the stage in September 1941. She is remembered in particular for performing as Carmen some 3,000 times. She continued her career as a voice teacher at the Toulouse Conservatoire.

Germaine Bailac died in Paris on 12 October 1977.
