= Saints and Sinners (1916 film) =

1916 film

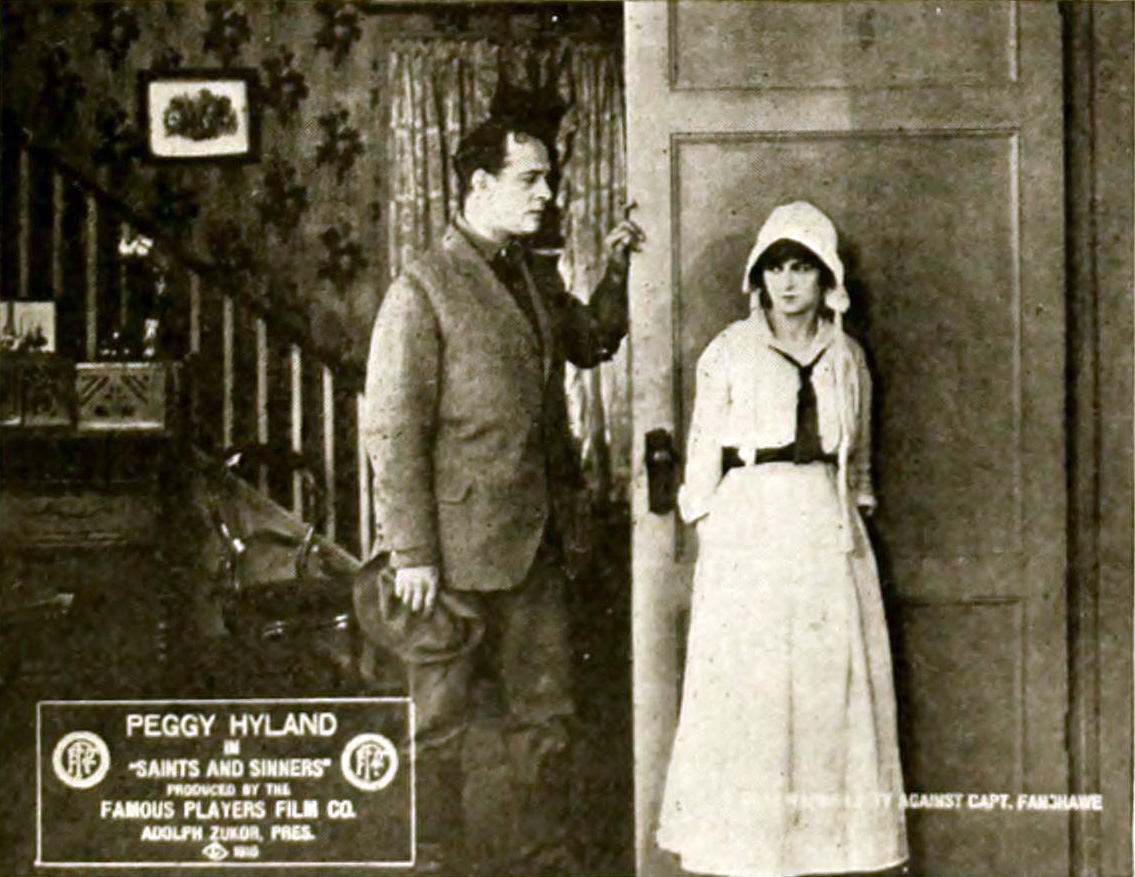
- Saints and Sinners
- Directed by: James Kirkwood, Sr.
- Screenplay by: Hugh Ford; Henry Arthur Jones (play)
- Starring: Estar Banks; Hal Forde; Clarence Handyside; Peggy Hyland; William Lampe; Horace Newman
- Cinematography: Ned Van Buren
- Production company: Famous Players Film Company
- Distributed by: Paramount Pictures
- Release date: May 25, 1916
- Country: United States
- Language: English

Saints and Sinners is a 1916 American drama silent film directed by James Kirkwood, Sr. and written by Hugh Ford and Henry Arthur Jones. The film stars Estar Banks, Hal Forde, Clarence Handyside, Peggy Hyland, William Lampe and Horace Newman. The film was released on May 25, 1916, by Paramount Pictures.

== Plot ==
A man named George loves a preachers daughter, but she doesn't seem to love him back. She brings scandal to her father by spending time with a man with a bad reputation. Eventually the characters in the movie have to deal with a scarlet fever epidemic. The various characters (including a preacher) redeem themselves and George ends up marrying the girl he liked.

== Cast ==
- Estar Banks as Lydia
- Hal Forde as Captain Fanshawe
- Clarence Handyside as Hoggard
- Peggy Hyland as Letty Fletcher
- William Lampe as George Kingsmill
- Horace Newman as Peter Greenacre
- Albert Tavernier as Jacob Fletcher
