= Déjanire =

Opera by Camille Saint-Saëns

- Opera by Camille Saint-Saëns
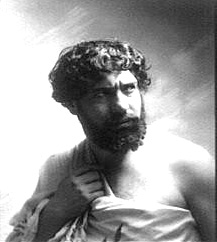
- Lucien Muratore as Hercules in the premiere production
- Librettist: Louis Gallet; Saint-Saëns
- Language: French
- Based on: The Trachiniae by Sophocles
- Premiere: 28 August 1898; Arènes, Béziers

Déjanire is the title of two related French works by Camille Saint-Saëns: Musique de scène pour ‘Déjanire’ de Gallet (1898) and the four-act opera, or drame lyrique, Déjanire (1910, premiered 1911) for which Saint-Saëns himself fashioned the dramatic scheme and libretto using Gallet's tragedy as a basis. The vocal writing in the musique de scène is exclusively choral in the manner of Ancient Greek narration and commentary, while in the drame lyrique it focuses on solo parts as in most operas. The musique de scène was written to inaugurate an arena in Béziers; the drame lyrique, last of Saint-Saëns' twelve operas, was written for Monaco. The latter's libretto has, besides Gallet, Sophocles' Trachiniae as a source, a main character being Hercule, in the path of Händel; Hercules had already been the subject of two Saint-Saëns tone poems: Le rouet d'Omphale (1869) and La jeunesse d'Hercule (1877).

== Composition history ==
Déjanire began its life in 1898 as a play with accompanying symphonic music, choruses and a ballet. Fernand Castelbon de Beauxhostes, one of the owners of a newly constructed arena in Béziers (used primarily for staging bullfights), wanted to make Béziers a centre for the performance of open-air opera as well. He persuaded Saint-Saëns to write the score for a performance of Louis Gallet's epic verse-drama Déjanire to inaugurate the project.

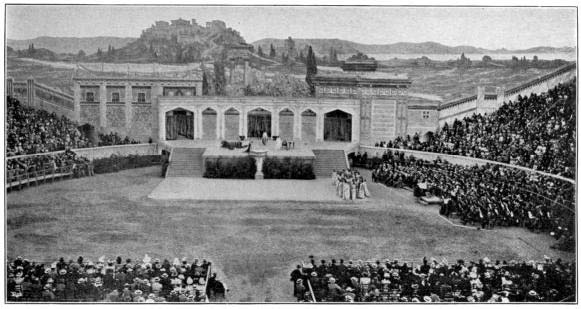
First representation of the play Déjanire in the arena of Béziers (1898)

At first Saint-Saëns was reluctant to have his music performed in what he called an "abominable temple of blood". However, Castelbon managed to convince him by inviting him to visit the arena where his arrival was greeted by hidden musicians playing in his honour. In August 1898 Déjanire opened in Béziers with two performances before 12,000 spectators each time. The reception was ecstatic with Saint-Saëns conducting a huge musical ensemble consisting of a choir of hundreds, massed military bands and an orchestra that included 18 harps and an array of 25 trumpets. Although fatally ill and suffering from deafness, Louis Gallet managed to attend the second performance. In his memoirs Saint-Saëns recalled:

In spite of everything, including his ill health which made the trip very painful, he wanted to see his work once more. He heard nothing, however – neither the artists, the choruses, nor even the applause of the several thousand spectators who encored it enthusiastically. A little later he passed on, leaving in his friends' hearts and at the work-tables of his collaborators a void which it is impossible to fill.

Twelve years later, Saint-Saëns transformed Gallet's play into a fully-fledged opera to fulfill a commission from the Opéra de Monte-Carlo. Gabriel Fauré was in the audience for its world premiere on 14 March 1911, conducted by Léon Jehin and directed by Raoul Gunsbourg.

== Performance history ==
The first performance was given on 28 August 1898 in the arena at Béziers, with Saint-Saëns conducting, in front of an audience of 8000. The following year it was performed again, this time with Gabriel Fauré conducting and Saint-Saëns in the audience. Following the Monte Carlo premiere, the work was performed at the Paris Opera on 22 November 1911. (The Paris premiere caused a minor scandal when Mlle. Delsaux danced the ballet segment with bare legs and clad only in "flimsy draperies" instead of the traditional bell-shaped skirt.)

The first performance of Déjanire in the United States came on 9 December 1915 when it was presented by the Chicago Opera Association with Carmen Melis and Lucien Muratore in the leading roles. Although very rarely performed today, Déjanire was revived at the Festival de Radio France et Montpellier in a 1985 performance conducted by Serge Baudo.

Role	Voice type	Cast, 14 March 1911 (Conductor: Léon Jehin)
Déjanire (Deianira)	soprano	Félia Litvinne
Iole	soprano	Yvonne Dubel
Phénice	contralto	Germaine Bailac
Hercule (Hercules)	tenor	Lucien Muratore
Philoctète (Philoctetes)	baritone	Henri Dangès
The people of Oechalia and Trachis (chorus)

== Synopsis ==
Place: Trachis
Time: Ancient Greece

Hercule has killed King Eurytus, and sacked the city of Oechalia with the intention of taking the king's beautiful daughter, Iole as his bride. The task of informing Iole of the impending marriage falls to Philoctète, who is actually her lover. Iole confesses her love for Philoctète to Hercule and must now marry him to save Philoctète's life. Meanwhile, Phénice tries to convince Hercule's wife, Déjanire, to leave him forever. Instead, the desperate Déjanire tries in vain to win back her husband. When this fails, she decides to help Iole by giving her a tunic impregnated with the blood of Nessus. Before he died, Nessus had told Déjanire that his blood had magic powers to make the unfaithful return. What Déjanire does not know is that the blood is actually tainted with a terrible poison. Iole gives the tunic to Hercule on their wedding day. When he puts on the fatal gift, he is overcome by an excruciating burning pain. In agony he throws himself into the flames of the wedding pyre and dying ascends to Mount Olympus.

== Recordings ==
- The tenor aria, "Viens, O toi dont le clair visage", from Déjanire can be heard on Antonio Paoli – Il Mito Dell'opera (Bongiovanni #1117).
- Concert performance and world premiere recording in December 2020 at the Prinzregententheater, Munich by the Münchner Rundfunkorchester in collaboration with the Palazzetto Bru Zane was cancelled due to the corona pandemic.
