= Marguerite Bériza =

French opera singer (1879–1970)

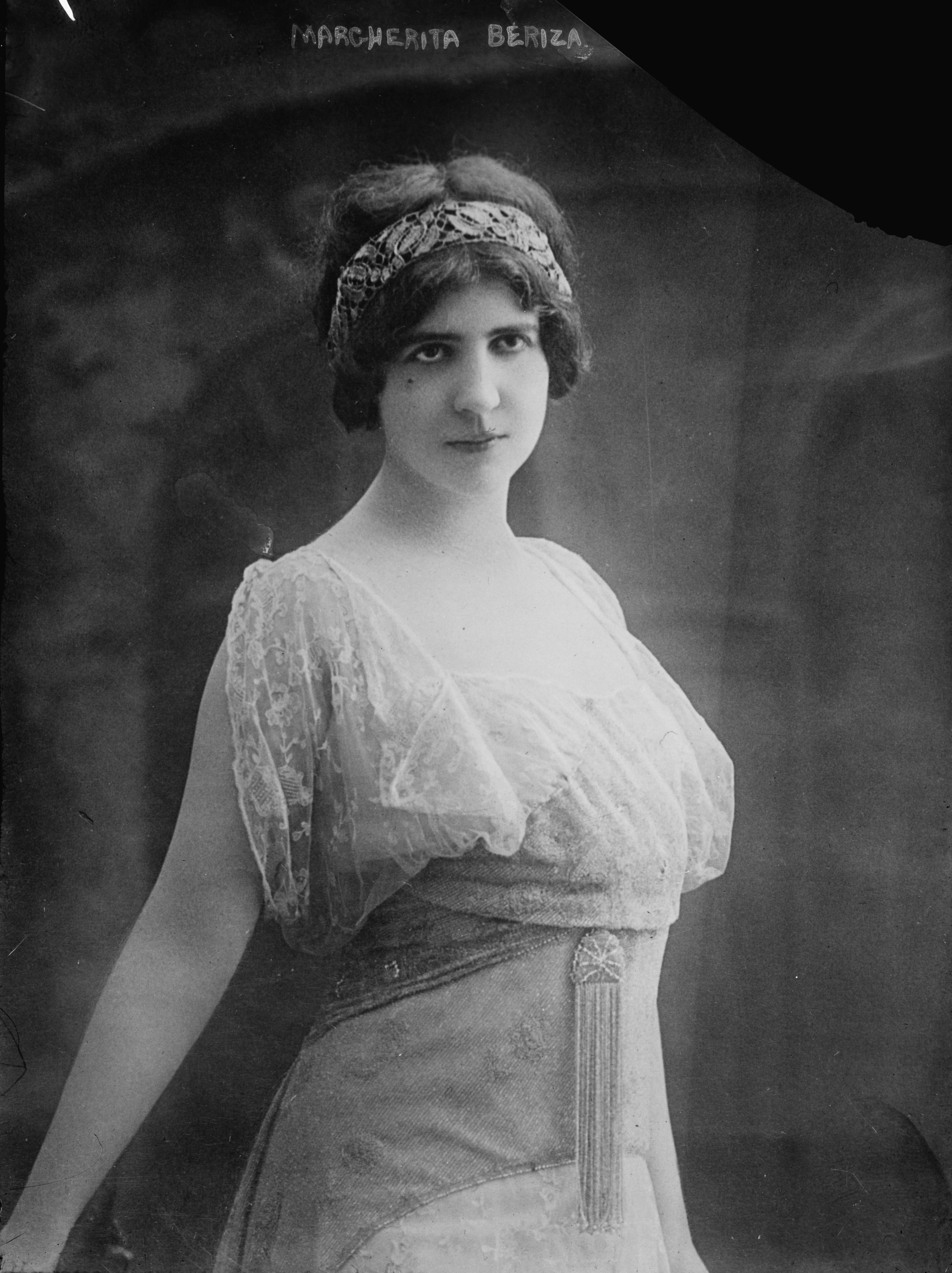
Marguerite Bériza

Marguerite Bériza (1879–1970) was a French opera singer who had an active international career during the first half of the 20th century. She began her career as a mezzo-soprano at the Opéra-Comique in 1900; ultimately transitioning into the leading soprano repertoire at that theatre in 1912. She performed extensively in the United States from 1914 to 1917 and was also heard as a guest artist at theatres in the French provinces, Monaco, Portugal, and Switzerland during her career. In 1924 she founded her own opera company in Paris with whom she actively performed up until 1930.

During her early career, Bériza was married to the French tenor Lucien Muratore. In 1906–1907, they appeared on several Edison cylinder recordings together where she was billed under the name Magli Muratore. She was also billed under that name on a 1910 Pathé Records recording which also included performances by Albert Vaguet and Henri Albers. She divorced Muratore in 1913 so he could marry the soprano Lina Cavalieri. On the stage she performed mainly under the name Marguerite Bériza, sometimes shortening it to Magli Bériza. However, she was occasionally billed under the surname Dériza and in her latter career as Mme Bériza-Greven, probably after a second marriage.

== Education and career as a mezzo-soprano ==
Marguerite Aimée Barousse known as Bériza, born on February 12, 1879, in Camberwell, was trained at the Conservatoire de Paris. She made her professional opera debut in 1900 at the Opéra-Comique in Paris where she was heard mostly in comprimario roles from the mezzo-soprano repertoire during the early part of her career. She performed the part of Geoffroy in the world premiere of Henri Rabaud's La fille de Roland in 1904. In 1906, she sang the role of Kate Pinkerton in the French premiere of Giacomo Puccini's Madame Butterfly; later taking over the part of Suzuki in successive performances. In 1910, she portrayed the role of Pénélope in the world premiere of Claude Terrasse's Le mariage de Télémaque.

Some of the roles that Bériza sang during her early years at the Opéra-Comique were the 2nd Priestess in both Christoph Willibald Gluck's Iphigénie en Aulide and Gluck's Iphigénie en Tauride, Gertrude in Charles Gounod's Roméo et Juliette, The Marquise of Birkenfeld in Gaetano Donizetti's La fille du régiment, and The Muse in Jacques Offenbach's The Tales of Hoffmann. In January 1909 and January 1910 she appeared as a guest artist at the Opéra de Monte-Carlo performing the roles of Erda, Flosshilde, and Waltraute in Richard Wagner's The Ring Cycle. She was also heard there as Stéphano in Roméo et Juliette.

== Career as a soprano ==
In 1912, Bériza began performing leading soprano roles at the Opéra-Comique. There she had major success in roles like Musetta in Puccini's La bohème, Santuzza in Pietro Mascagni's Cavalleria rusticana, Violetta in Giuseppe Verdi's La traviata, and the title roles in Ambroise Thomas's Mignon and Puccini's Tosca. She also continued to perform roles traditionally sung by mezzo-sopranos like Anita in Jules Massenet's La Navarraise and Mallika in Léo Delibes's Lakmé. She sang leading roles as a guest artist at the Grand Théâtre de Genève, the Opéra de Marseille, the Opéra de Nice, and the Opéra National de Lyon.

While still performing occasionally at the Opéra-Comique, Bériza gave numerous performances in the United States during the second decade of the 20th century. In late 1913 she came to the United States for the first time to sing with the Boston Opera Company; making her debut with the company in January 1914 as Musetta to the Mimi of Maggie Teyte. She appeared in several more roles with the company that year, including Antonia in The Tales of Hoffmann, Marguerite in Gounod's Faust and the title roles in Gustave Charpentier's Louise and Henry Février's Monna Vanna (replacing Mary Garden in the role).

Bériza sang Monna Vanna for her debut with the Chicago Grand Opera Company in 1915. She performed in several operas at Ravinia Park, Illinois (with the Chicago Symphony Orchestra), in July–August 1916, including singing Cio-Cio-San in Puccini's Madama Butterfly, Marguerite, Santuzza, Tosca, and the title role in Georges Bizet's Carmen. She returned to Ravinia in the summer of 1917 to sing the French national anthem, Leonora in Verdi's Il trovatore, and, with Orville Harrold, Santuzza and the title role in Massenet's Manon. She performed at Ravinia again in 1928. In 1917 she toured the United States with the Giuseppe Creatore Grand Opera Company and appeared at the Odeon Theatre in St. Louis, Missouri, in the world premiere of Homer Moore's Louis XIV.

In 1923, Bériza joined the roster of the Théâtre Fiametta in Paris where she performed in several contemporary stage works. In 1924 she starred in the world premiere of Lord Berners's Le Carrosse du Saint Sacrement at the Théâtre des Champs-Élysées. She was also heard at that theater in April of that year as Isabelle in the world premiere of Henri Sauguet's Le plumet du colonel.

In 1924, Bériza founded the Theatre Bériza in Paris which housed a resident opera company, ballet company, and a troupe of actors for a variety of performing arts productions; often with an avant-garde aesthetic. Bériza starred in many productions at her theatre throughout the 1920s. In the 1924–1925 season she sang leading roles in her company's presentations of Paul Le Flem's Aucassin et Nicolette, Francesco Malipiero's Les Sept Chansons, Charles Koechlin's Jacob chez Laban, Manuel de Falla's L'Amour sorcier, Georges Migot's La Fête de la bergère, and Gabriel Dupont's La Farce du cuvier at the Trianon-Lyrique in Paris. With her company she portrayed the title role in the world premiere of Jacques Ibert's Angélique at the Théâtre Fémina in Paris on 28 January 1927. In 1928 her company made the unusual but successful choice of presenting two secular cantatas of Johann Sebastian Bach in staged productions: The Peasant Cantata and The Coffee Cantata. One of her last stage appearances was as Polly Peachum in Kurt Weill's The Threepenny Opera in 1930.
