= Love's Conquest =

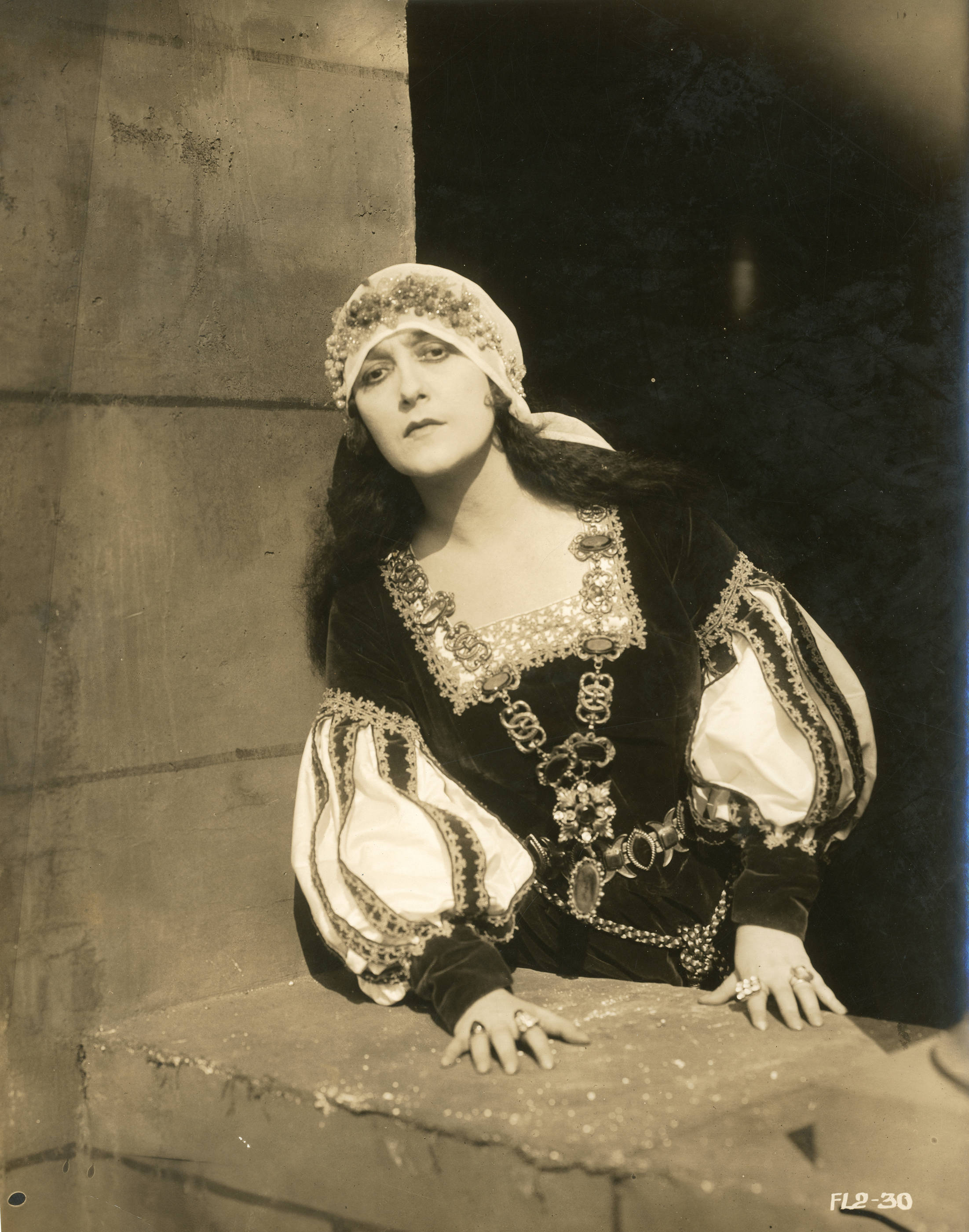
- Still with Cavalieri
- Directed by: Edward José
- Screenplay by: Charles E. Whittaker
- Based on: Gismonda by Victorien Sardou
- Produced by: Adolph Zukor
- Starring: Lina Cavalieri; Courtenay Foote; Fred Radcliffe; Frank Lee; J.H. Gilmour; Isabel Berwin
- Cinematography: Hal Young
- Production company: Famous Players–Lasky Corporation
- Distributed by: Paramount Pictures
- Release date: May 21, 1918
- Running time: 50 minutes
- Country: United States
- Language: Silent (English intertitles)

Love's Conquest is a lost 1918 American silent drama film directed by Edward José and written by Charles E. Whittaker after the play Gismonda by Victorien Sardou. The film stars Lina Cavalieri, Courtenay Foote, Fred Radcliffe, Frank Lee, J.H. Gilmour, and Isabel Berwin. The film was released on May 21, 1918, by Paramount Pictures.

== Plot ==
As described in a film magazine, determined that her son Francesco will have every advantage of a successful reign when he grows to manhood, Duchess Gismonda refuses all offers of marriage. A sudden danger to her son prompts her to offer her kingdom to the man who rescues the child. Almerio braves the dangers of the lion's den to save the child, but because he is a slave the Duchess refuses to fulfill her vow. Gradually, she learns to love him, and after he assumes the guilt for a murder that she committed, Gismonda confesses to the crime and in the presence of her people makes Almerio her consort.

== Cast ==
- Lina Cavalieri as Gismonda
- Courtenay Foote as Almerio
- Fred Radcliffe as Prince Zaccaria
- Frank Lee as Gregoras
- J.H. Gilmour as Bishop
- Isabel Berwin as Nurse
- Freddie Verdi as Francesco

== Production ==
Love's Conquest was filmed on sets constructed at the Famous Players-Lasky Studios in Fort Lee, New Jersey.

== Reception ==
Like many American films of the time, Love's Conquest was subject to restrictions and cuts by city and state film censorship boards. For example, the Chicago Board of Censors cut, in Reel 4, the four intertitles "If I accept swear that none shall ever know", "Swear that tomorrow you will release me from every obligation", "Go to your hut this way — at midnight I shall be with you", and "No, if this is to be your recompense, so be it", Almerio embracing Gismonda in hut, removing cloak and opening door to adjoining room, scene of light being extinguished in window, Reel 5, the intertitle "Dawn" and Gismonda leaving hut, the intertitle "Kill him while he sleeps with one blow", actual stabbing, and the intertitle "Keep the crown and give me the woman unknown to all".
