= Yvonne Dubel =

French opera singer

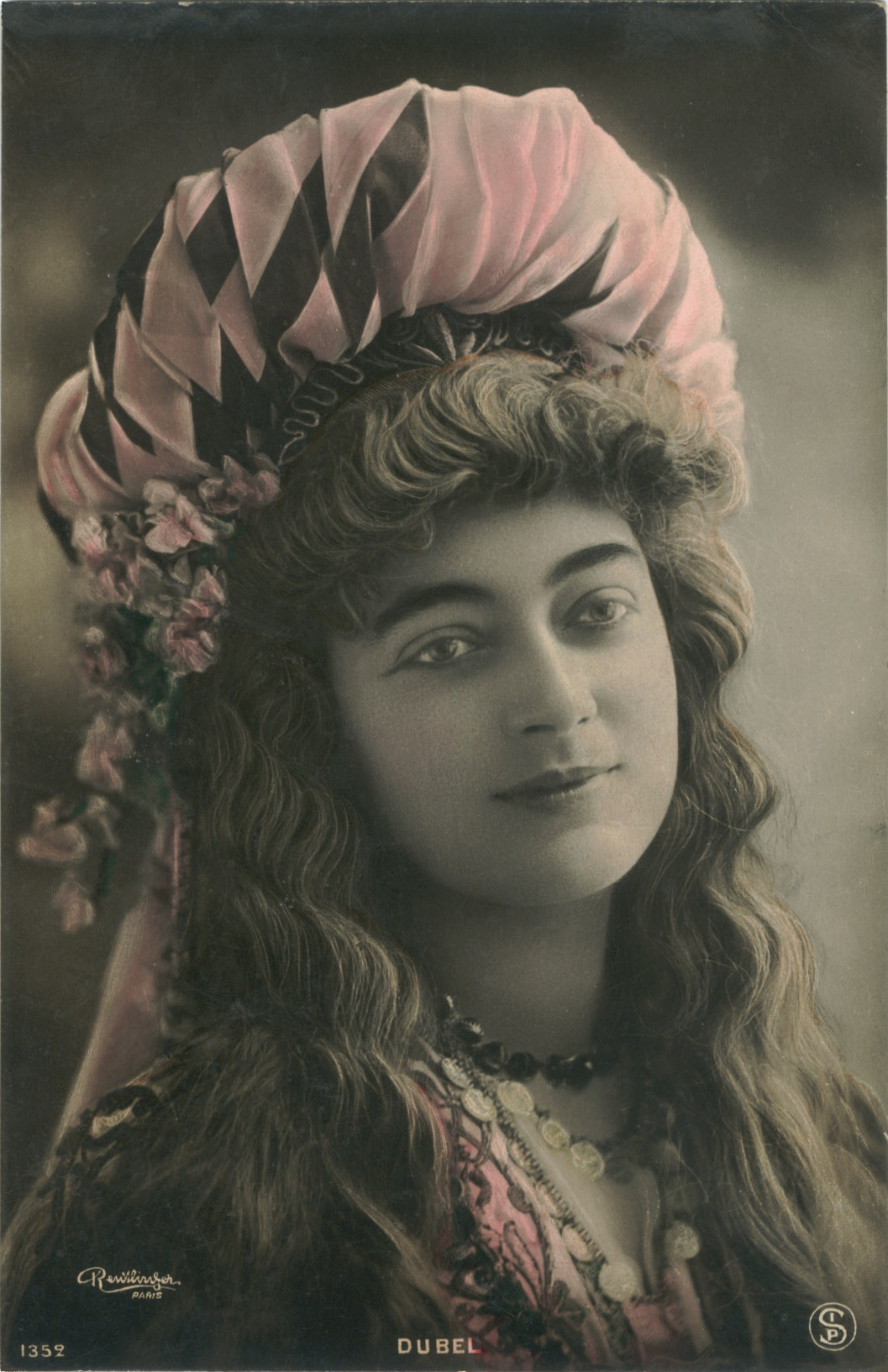
Yvonne Dubel

Yvonne Dubel (1881–1958) was a French operatic soprano from Rennes. After completing her studies at the city's Conservatoire, she débuted in 1904 at the Paris Opera as Elsa in Wagner's Lohengrin. In March 1911 at the Monte Carlo Opera, she created the role of Iole in Déjanire by Saint-Saëns. In addition to guest appearances in the French provinces (1907–1912), she performed in countries across Europe, including Belgium, Germany, Greece and the Netherlands.

== Biography ==
Born in Rennes on 19 September 1881, Yvonne Dubel was a great-niece of the operatic tenor Gustave-Hippolyte Roger (1815–1879). After first being trained in voice by her mother, she attended the Rennes Conservatoire before completing her studies at the Conservatoire de Paris under Maria Escalaïs-Lureau.

In 1904, she made her début at the Paris Opera as Elsa in Wagner's Lohengrin. Under an engagement from 1905 to 1907, her roles included Hilda in Ernest Reyer's Sigurd, Marguerite in Gounod's Faust and Juliette in his Roméo et Juliette, Margaret of Valois in Meyerbeer's Les Huguenots and the title role in Massenet's Thaïs.

From 1907, she performed in the French provinces as well as at the Monte Carlo Opera where in March 1911 she created the role of Iole in the première of Saint-Saëns' Déjanire. Dubel was invited to appear in operas in Austria, Belgium, Germany, Greece, the Netherlands, Romania and Russia. Among her many roles were Ophelia in Thomas' Hamlet, Micaela in Bizet's Carmen, Rozenn in Lalo's Le Roi d'Ys, Salomé in Massenet's Hérodiade and the title role in his Manon, Gilda in Verdi's Rigoletto, Leonora in Il trovatore and Mimi in Puccini's La Bohême.

Yvonne Dubel died in Roscoff on 21 June 1958.
