= Clarence Handyside =

American actor (1854–1931)

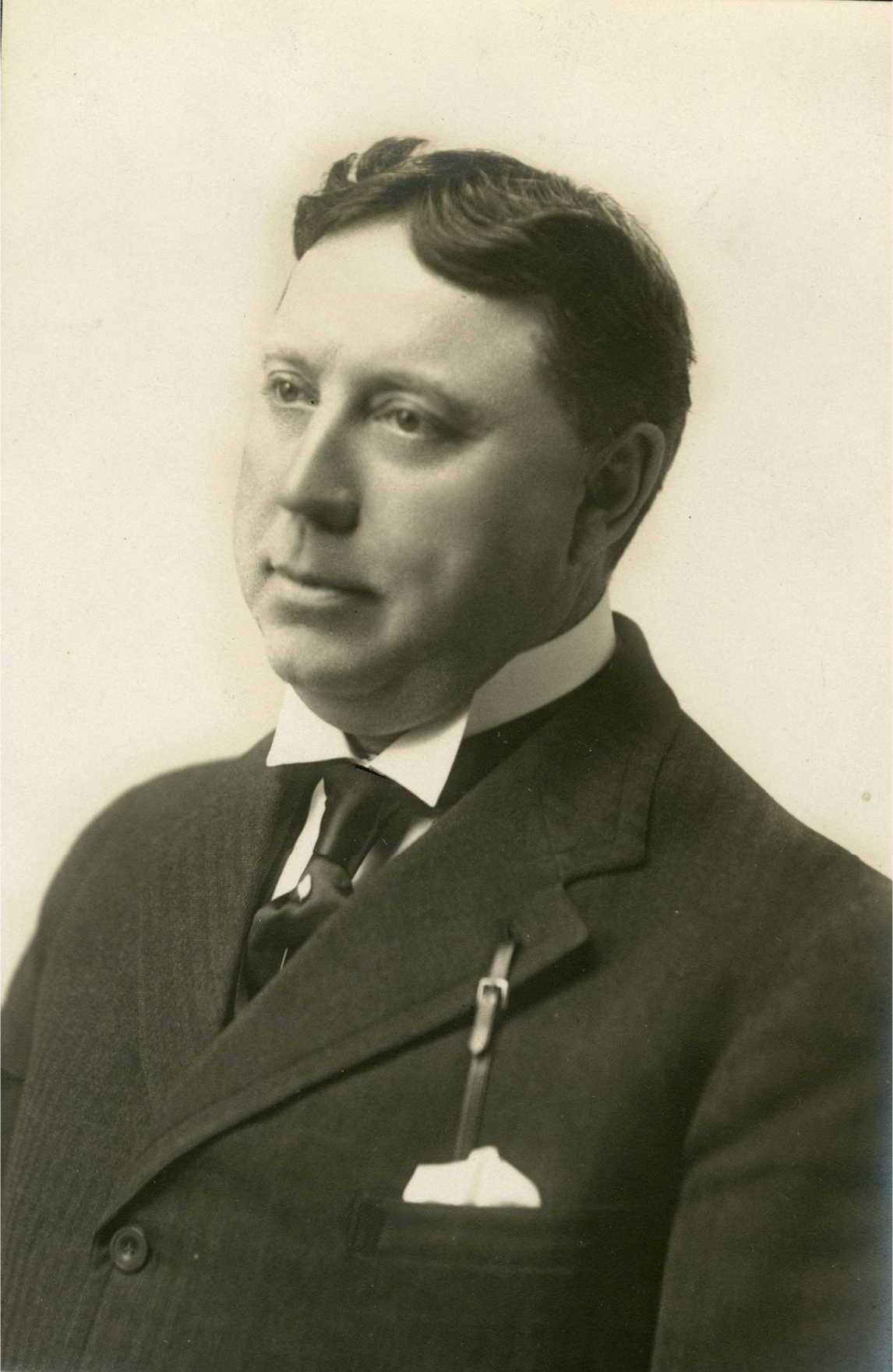
- Handyside in 1908
- Born: Clarence Auckland Handyside; April 28, 1854; Montreal, United Province of Canada
- Died: December 20, 1931 (aged 77)
- Occupation: Actor

Clarence Auckland Handyside (April 28, 1854 – December 20, 1931) was an American actor.

Handyside was born in 1854 in Montreal, United Province of Canada, as Clarence Auckland Handyside.

Handyside's acting debut came in Canada when he was 21 years old.

Clarence Handyside, a 1912 cast member at the Elitch Theatre, appearing for the second straight season, and who had long been a favorite in New York, expressed his sentiments about leaving:

"There is always a touch of real sadness about this breaking up of the summer stock company. The relationships one forms at this time of the year are closer than those formed by the members of companies on tour in the winter. There the actors are traveling all the time and are stopping in different hotels, so that they seldom see each other except at the theater. Here we are just like one big family. This is particularly true here at Elitch Gardens.

Mrs. Mary Elitch Long looks after her family of summer players with such care – finding them delightful homes, promoting fine friendships, arranging many pleasures for them – that the work here doesn’t seem like work at all, but just one long, pleasant outing. The actors are thrown together so constantly that they get very fond of each other, and used to the little family circle.

When the last curtain shuts us from the audience, and we gather on the dimly-lit stage for the last time to say good-bye, there are lumps in every throat, and tears in every eye.

The summer here at the Gardens has been delightful during every moment. The players have been more than congenial, and Mrs. Long and the Denver public more than kind. None of us want to go away.

He was known for His Picture in the Papers (1916), Silks and Satins (1916) and Mice and Men (1916).

He was married to Blanche Sharp and Kate D. Baker. Handyside died on December 20, 1931, in Philadelphia, Pennsylvania. He was survived by his wife.

== Selected filmography ==
- The Jungle (1914)
- Saints and Sinners (1916)
- The Woman in the Case (1916)
- His Picture in the Papers (1916)
- Mice and Men (1916)
- A Woman of Impulse (1918)
- From Two to Six (1918)
- Rose of the World (1918)
- The Turn of the Wheel as American Consul (1918)
