= The Shadow of Her Past =

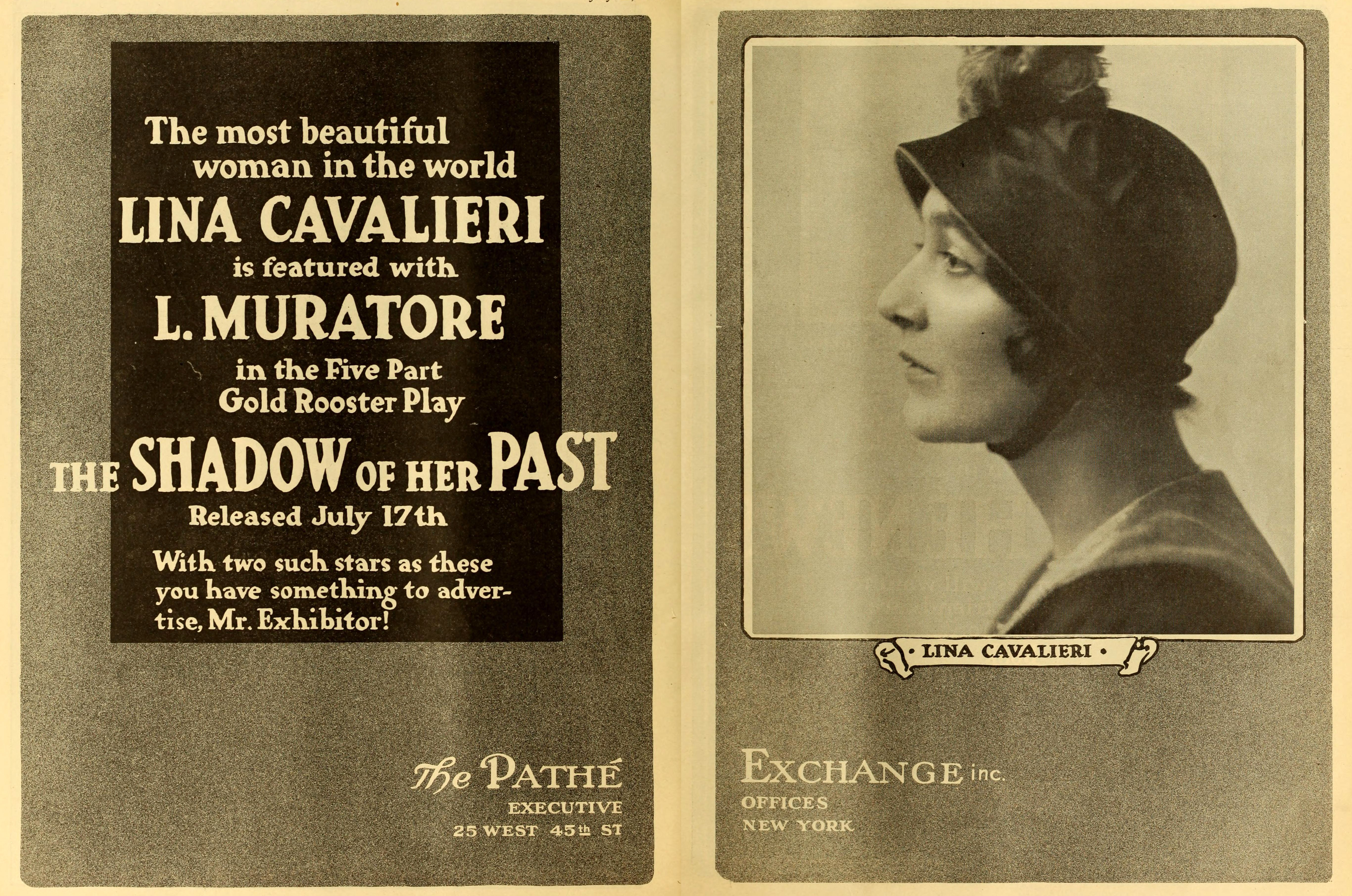
- Directed by: Emilio Ghione
- Starring: Lina Cavalieri
- Production company: Tiber-film
- Distributed by: Tiber-film
- Release date: November 1915
- Country: Italy
- Languages: Silent; Italian intertitles

The Bride of Death (Italian: Sposa nella morte!) is a 1915 Italian silent drama film directed by Emilio Ghione and starring Lina Cavalieri. It was shot on location in Paris and Rome, with Cavalieri's contract giving her a percentage of the profits. It was released in the United States the following year, under the alternative title of The Shadow of Her Past, but was not well received.

== Cast ==
- Angelo Bonfanti
- Ida Carloni Talli
- Alfonso Cassini
- Lina Cavalieri
- Alberto Collo
- Diomira Jacobini
- Lucien Muratore
- Luigi Scotto

== Bibliography ==
- Paul Fryer, Olga Usova. Lina Cavalieri: The Life of Opera's Greatest Beauty, 1874-1944. McFarland, 2003.
