= Lucien Muratore =

French opera singer (1876–1954)

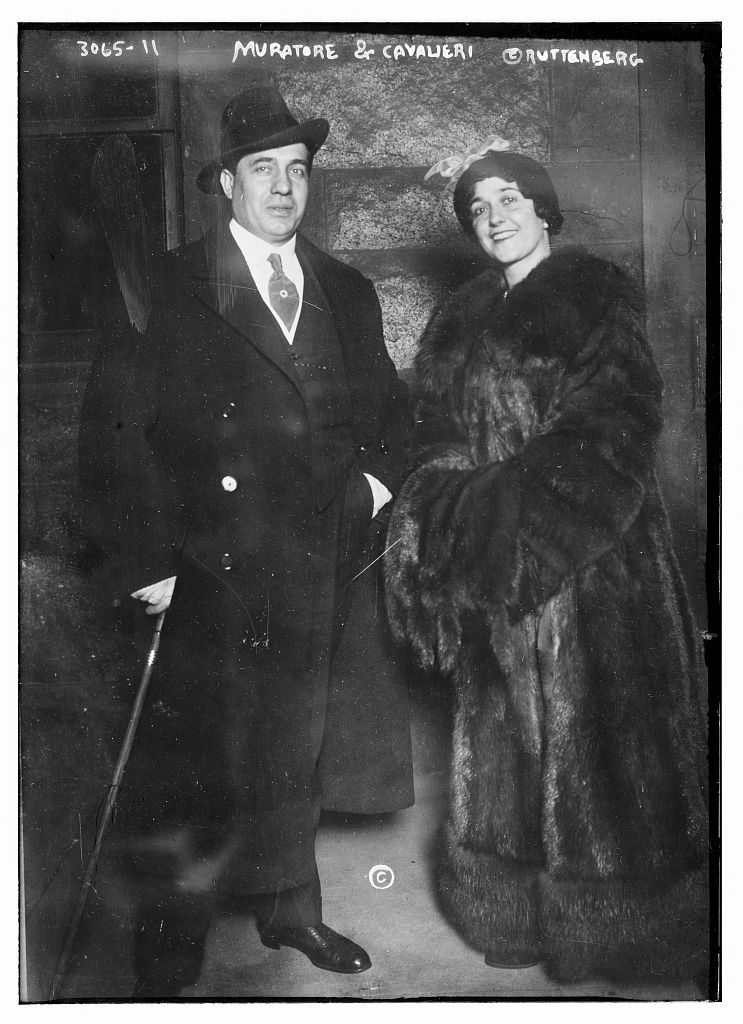
Muratore and Lina Cavalieri circa 1915

Lucien Muratore (29 August 1876 – 16 July 1954, in Paris) was a French actor and operatic dramatic tenor, particularly associated with the French repertory.

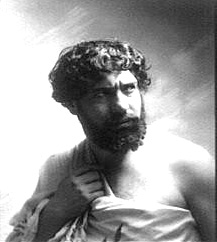
Lucien Muratore as Hercule in Déjanire by Camille Saint-Saëns

== Life and career ==
Lucien Muratore was born Marseille to Italian parents from Piedmont. He trained first as a cornist, and later as an actor. He made his debut at the Odéon theatre in Paris, where he played opposite such actresses as Sarah Bernhardt and Réjane. He then studied at the Paris Music Conservatory, and made his operatic debut in 1902, at the Opéra-Comique, creating the King in Reynaldo Hahn's La carmélite.

He made his debut at La Monnaie in 1904, as Werther, and the following year at the Palais Garnier, as Renaud in Lully's Armide.

He created several Massenet operas such as Ariane and Bacchus, at the Opéra, and Roma, in Monte Carlo. He also took part in the creation of La Catalane by Le Borne, Monna Vanna by Henry Février, Déjanire by Camille Saint-Saëns, and Pénélope by Gabriel Fauré.

He became principal French tenor with the Boston Opera Company, the Chicago Grand Opera Company (1913–1914), the Chicago Opera Association (1915–1921), and the Chicago Civic Opera (1922). He also appeared at the Teatro Colón in Buenos Aires.

Muratore retired from the stage in 1931. He was married first to soprano Marguerite Bériza, and later to soprano Lina Cavalieri, with whom he appeared in a silent movie, Manon Lescaut, in 1914.

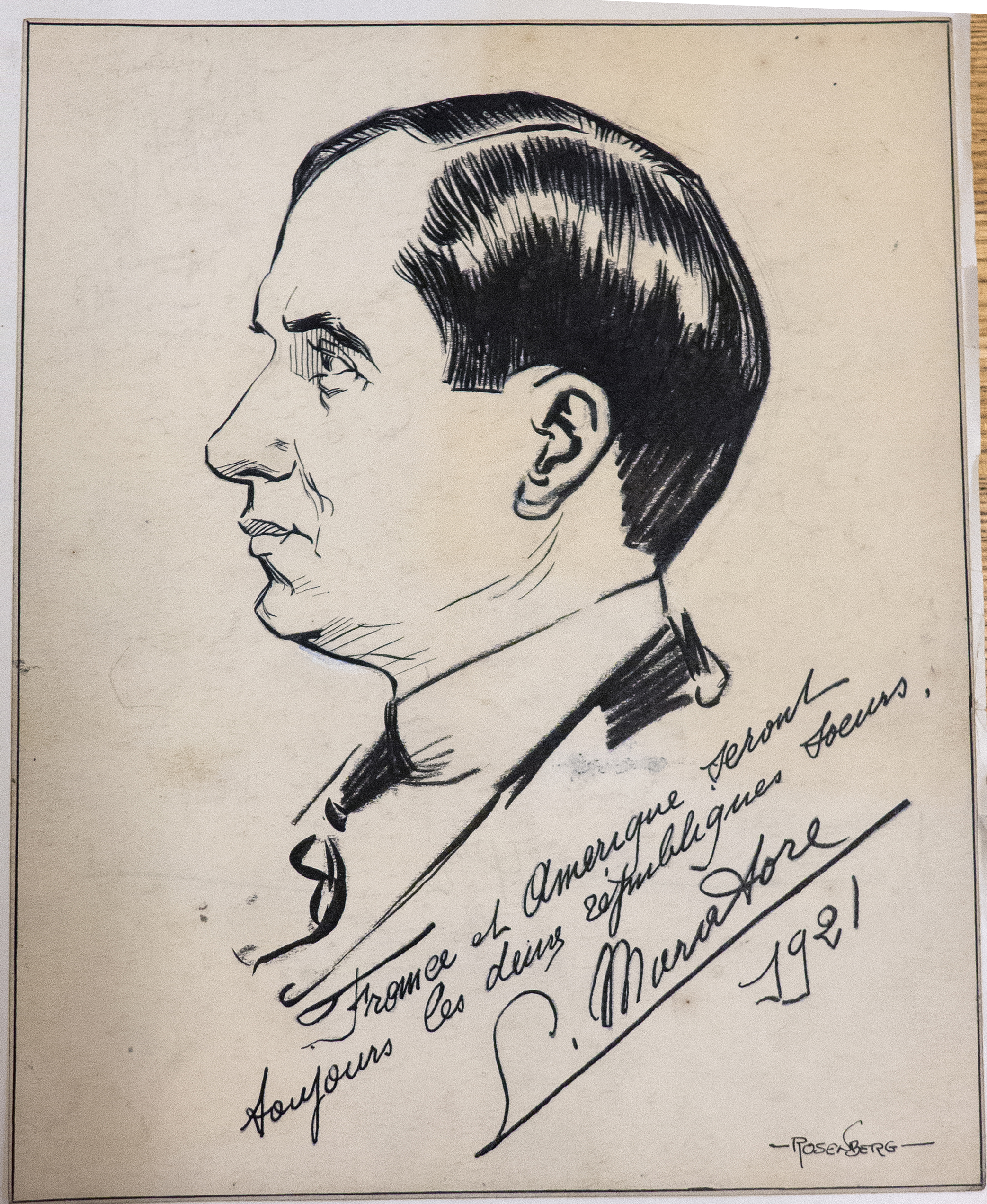
Lucien Muratore autographed drawing by Manuel Rosenberg, performing in "Monna Vanna" --Cincinnati, Ohio 1921

In 1944 Muratore was for a few weeks Director of the Opéra-Comique but was removed on the Liberation of Paris.

His art of singing was at times almost overshadowed by his immense talent as an actor and elegance on stage.

His students included Kenneth Neate, to whom he gave some of his own costumes for Don José (Bizet's Carmen).

== Selected filmography ==
- The Shadow of Her Past (1915)
- The Unknown Singer (1931)
- The Faceless Voice (1933)

== Sources ==
- Roland Mancini and Jean-Jacques Rouveroux, (orig. H. Rosenthal and J. Warrack, French edition), Guide de l’opéra, Les indispensables de la musique (Fayard, 1995). ISBN 2-213-59567-4
