= Wallace Beery =

American actor (1885–1949)

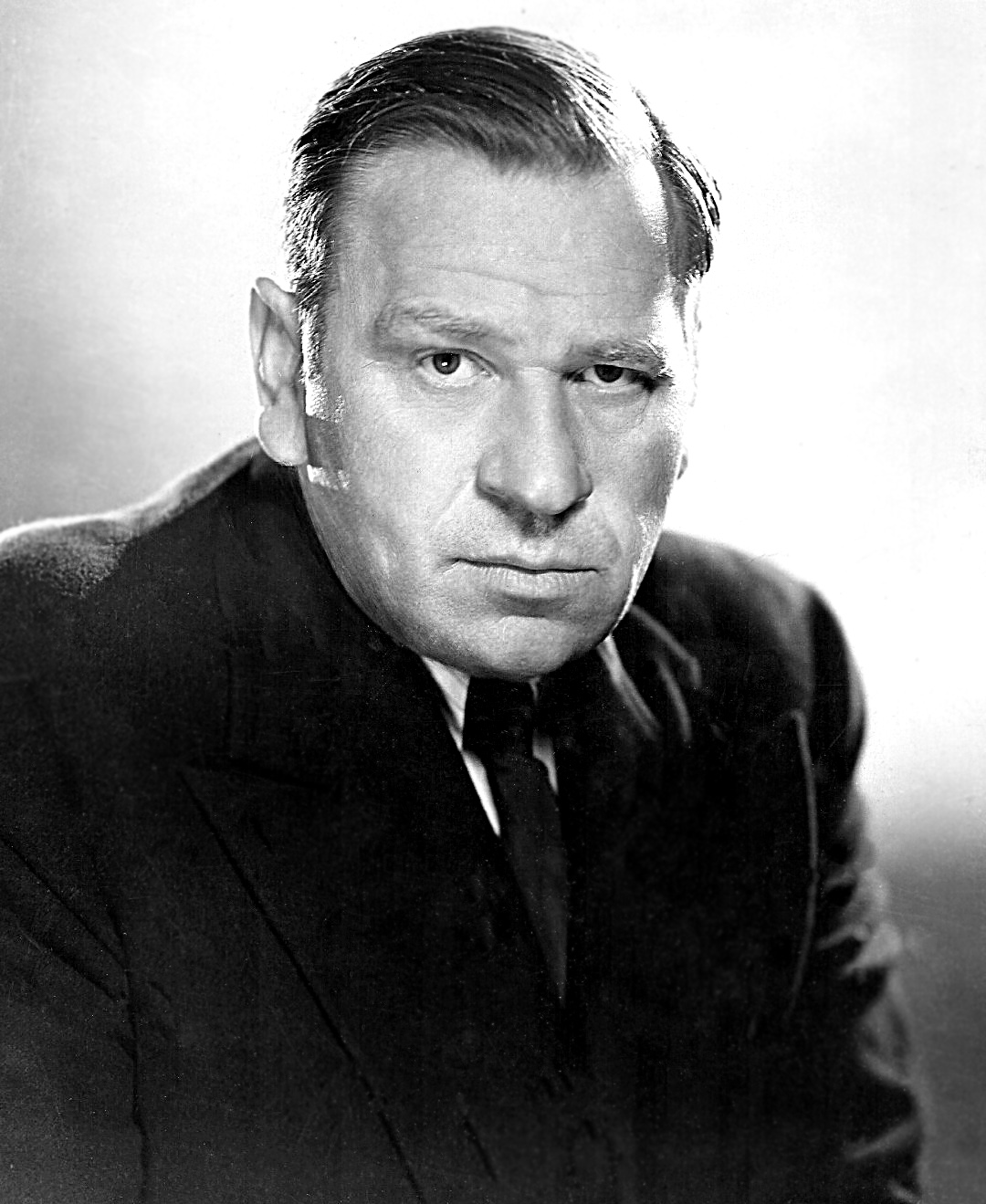
- Beery c. 1930
- Born: Wallace Fitzgerald Beery; April 1, 1885; Clay County, Missouri, U.S.
- Died: April 15, 1949 (aged 64); Beverly Hills, California, U.S.
- Resting place: Forest Lawn Memorial Park, Glendale, California, U.S.
- Occupations: Actor; film director
- Years active: 1904–1949
- Spouses: Gloria Swanson (m. 1916; div. 1918) Rita Gilman (m. 1924; div. 1939)
- Children: 1
- Relatives: Noah Beery Sr. (brother); Noah Beery Jr. (nephew)

Wallace Fitzgerald Beery (April 1, 1885 – April 15, 1949) was a popular American film actor who appeared in a vast number of films from 1914 to 1949.

Beery is best known for his portrayal of Bill in Min and Bill (1930) opposite Marie Dressler, as General Director Preysing in Grand Hotel (1932), as the pirate Long John Silver in Treasure Island (1934), as Pancho Villa in Viva Villa! (1934) and his title role in The Champ (1931). Beery won the Academy Award for Best Actor for The Champ.

Beery appeared in 250 films during a 36-year career. His contract with Metro-Goldwyn-Mayer stipulated in 1932 that he be paid $1 more than any other contract player at the studio. This made Beery the highest-paid film actor in the world during the early 1930s. For his contributions to the film industry, Beery was posthumously inducted into the Hollywood Walk of Fame in 1960.

Beery played a variety of roles, including cowboys, sailors, soldiers, European nobles, Native American warriors, hustlers and criminals. He appeared in melodramas, westerns, dramas, historical films, musicals and many comedies. His frequent film persona in later years was that of the uncouth, loud scoundrel with the heart of gold.

In his personal life, Beery was married three times and had one adopted child. He was the brother of actor Noah Beery and uncle of actor Noah Beery Jr. Many of Beery's co-workers in the film industry described Beery as being antagonistic and perennially unprepared for scenes. Beery died of a heart attack in 1949.

== Early life ==
Wallace Beery was born on April 1, 1885, in Clay County, Missouri, to Noah Webster Beery and Frances Margaret "Marguerite" Fitzgerald. He was the youngest of three boys. His brothers included Noah Beery and William Beery, both of whom had careers as film actors. The Beery family moved from Clay County in the 1890s to Kansas City, Missouri, where his father Noah worked as a police officer.

Beery attended the Chase School in Kansas City and took piano lessons as well. He showed no interest in school. He ran away from home as a young boy, then returned home after a short while. After coming home, Berry dropped out of school and started working in the Kansas City train yards as an engine wiper. Beery ran away from home a second time in 1902 at age 16. He joined the Ringling Brothers Circus, working as an assistant elephant trainer. Beery left the circus in 1904 after being clawed by a leopard.

== Career ==
=== Early career in New York ===
After leaving the circus, Beery moved to New York City to join his brother, who was working there in vaudeville shows. Wallace Beery soon found work in comic opera as a baritone singer He appeared in productions on Broadway and in summer stock theatre. One of his first theater credits was the musical comedy The Belle of the West in 1905, which ran for only eight performances at the Grand Opera House.

In 1907, Berry was cast as the understudy for Raymond Hitchcock, who was playing a war correspondent in the musical comedy The Yankee Tourist at the Astor Theater. However, Hitchcock disappeared one day after being indicted in Manhattan for sexual abuse of a 15-year-old girl. In full dress, Beery waited at the stage door for Hitchcock to arrive, then finally entered the play. It was supposed to close after a couple of weeks, but Hitchcock finally showed up. Beery later played the role with the road company.

=== Comedic actor ===
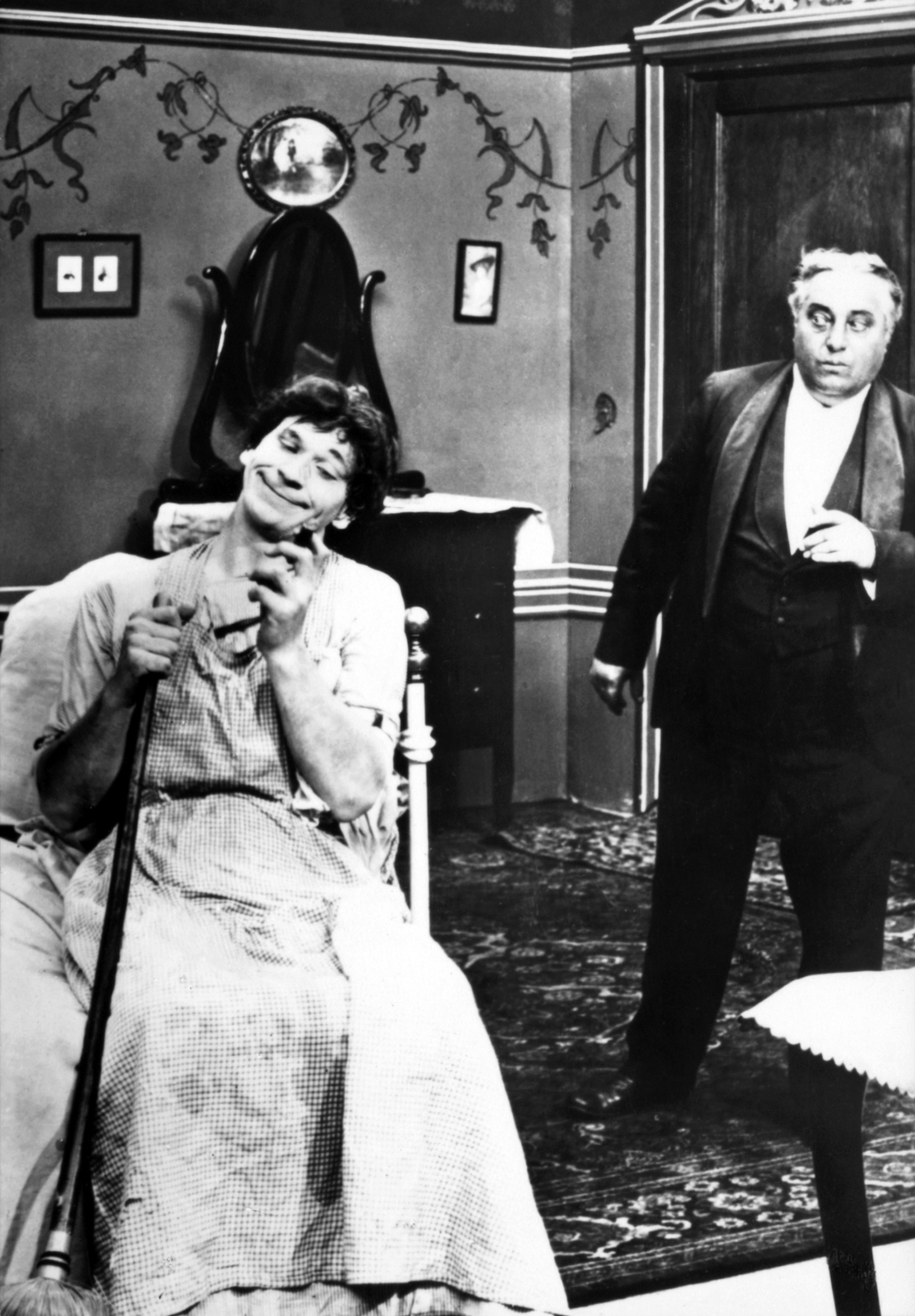
Beery as Sweedie the Swedish maid (1914)

==== Short films ====
In 1913, Beery started working in silent films for Essanay Studios His first movie is cited as being a comedy short, His Athletic Wife (1913).Beery was then cast as "Sweedie", a female Swedish maid in 29 short comedy films from 1914 to 1916. Sweedie Learns to Swim (1914), only ten minutes long, co-starred Ben Turpin. Sweedie Goes to College (1915) starred Gloria Swanson. Berry married Swanson the following year.

While playing "Sweedie", Berry also performed in the following short films for Essanay:

- In and Out (1914)
- The Ups and Downs (1914)
- Cheering a Husband (1914)
- Madame Double X (1914)
- Ain't It the Truth (1915)
- Two Hearts That Beat as Ten (1915)
- The Fable of the Roistering Blades (1915)

==== Feature films ====
===== 1915 =====
In 1915, Beery started appearing in comedy feature films. He played "Popova" a tutor, in the Essanay film The Slim Princess (1915), with Francis X. Bushman. Beery also appeared with Swanson in the comedy The Broken Pledge (1915). This was Beery's final film with Essanay, which was bought out that year.

===== 1916 and 1917 =====
Beery and Swanson worked again in A Dash of Courage (1916), created by Triangle Film Corporation in Southern California. Beery played a lovestruck, German soldier in the World War I comedy The Little American (1917) for Artcraft Pictures with Mary Pickford, directed by Cecil B. De Mille. Beery also appeared in some short film comedies for producer Mack Sennett, Maggie's First False Step (18 minutes long) (1917) and Teddy at the Throttle (1917) with Swanson.

=== Villain roles ===
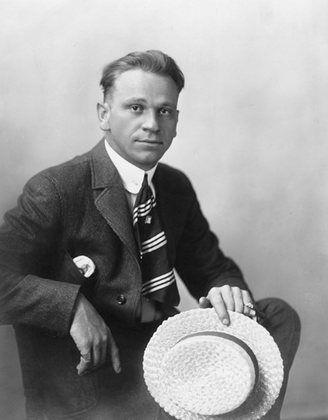
Beery (1914

==== 1919 ====
In 1919, Beery transitioned into a series of roles as movie villain in dramas and action films. By 1923, the New York Times was calling Beery the most popular villain in Hollywood among the studios.

Beery's first villain was "Colonel Klemm", a German Army rapist, in the World Pictures drama The Unpardonable Sin (1919) with Blanche Sweet. Beery also played the villain in supporting roles in three films with Paramount Pictures for 1919:

- A unwanted suitor in The Love Burglar (1919) with Wallace Reid
- A treasure-hunting criminal in Victory (1919), with Jack Holt, an adaptation of a Joseph Conrad novel
- A German U-boat commander in the war drama Behind the Door (1919)

Berry also had a supporting role in the Famous Players–Lasky film The Life Line (1919) as a criminal in London

==== 1920 ====
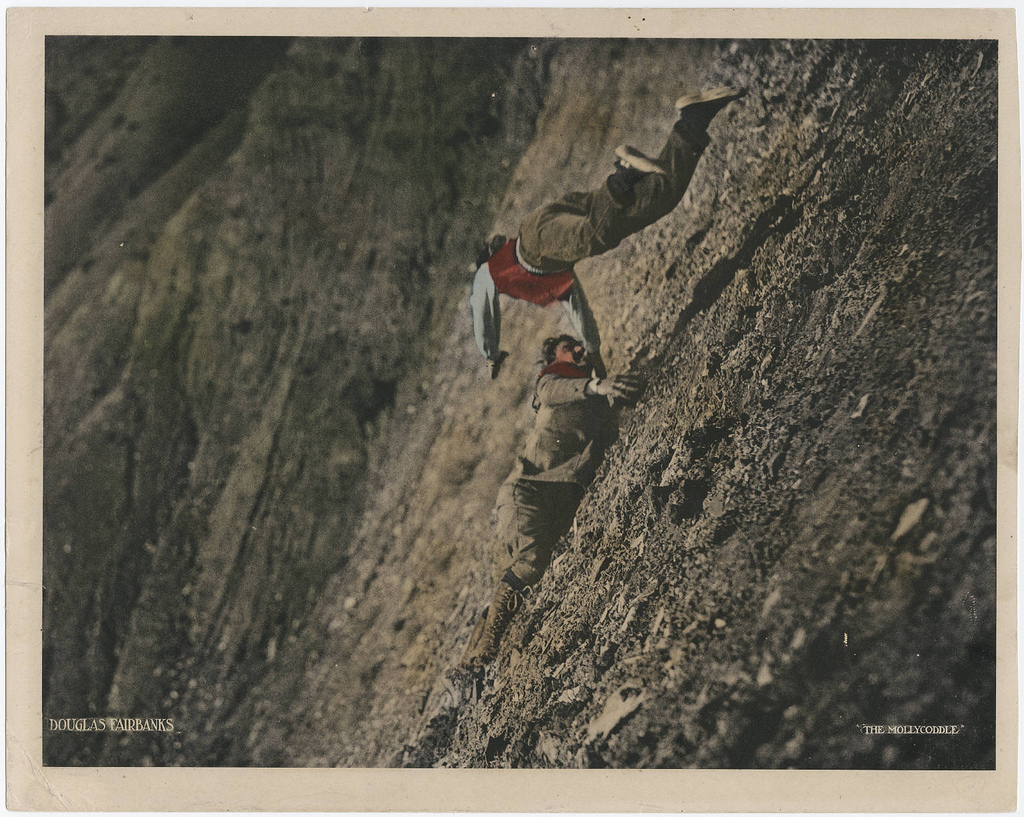
Douglas Fairbanks and Beery in The Mollycoddle (1920)

Beery played the villain in five major film releases in 1920:

- 813, a mystery film by Charles Christie for the Robertson-Cole Pictures Corporation
- The Virgin of Stamboul, an adventure film for Universal Pictures, directed by Tod Browning
- The Mollycoddle, an action film for United Artists (UA) with Douglas Fairbanks, directed by Victor Fleming. A film highlight was a fight between Fairbanks and Beery as they tumbled down a steep mountainside.
- The Round-Up, a western drama starring Roscoe Arbuckle for Famous Players–Lasky
- The Last of the Mohicans, an adaptation of the James Fenimore Cooper novel for Associated Producers, with Beery playing the Huron warrior "Magua"

==== 1921 and 1922 ====
Beery played "Lieut. Col. von Richthosen", a supporting part in the anti-war drama The Four Horsemen of the Apocalypse (1921) for Metro Pictures with Rudolph Valentino. He was "Lung Jo", an evil Tong leader in the Goldwyn Pictures action film A Tale of Two Worlds (1921). Some of Beery's roles as villains for 2022 include:

- Sleeping Acres (1922), an adventure film
- Wild Honey (1922), a romance
- I Am the Law (1922), a drama about the Royal Canadian Mounted Police. The film featured Noah Beery

=== Historical films ===
==== 1922 ====
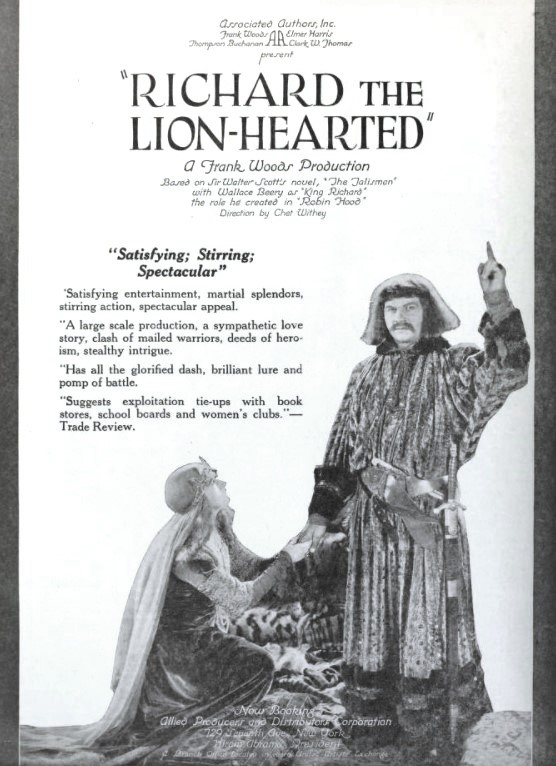
Berry in Richard the Lion-Hearted (1923)

By 1922, Beery was able to find a more diverse selection of supporting roles. He played "King Richard I" in the UA film historical drama Robin Hood (1922), starring Fairbanks as Robin Hood.

Beery had an important unbilled cameo for Goldwyn Pictures as "the Ape-Man" in the horror film A Blind Bargain (1922) starring Lon Chaney. Some of the film posters show Beery crouching in ape-man make-up in the background.

==== 1923 ====
The box office success of Robin Hood prompted UA to release a sequel in 1923; Richard the Lion-Hearted, starring Beery in the same role. Beery filled a supporting role in the United Pictures romance The Flame of Life (1923). He was cast in another supporting role as "King Philip IV" in the romance The Spanish Dancer (1923) from Paramount Pictures.

For the first time, Beery was cast as a leading man in the action-melodrama, Stormswept (1923) for FBO Pictures Corp with Virginia Brown Faire and his brother Noah.. The tagline on the movie's posters was "Wallace and Noah Beery – The Two Greatest Character Actors on the American Screen."

Beery played a supporting role for First National Pictures as the aristocratic Duc de Tours, in the historical drama, Ashes of Vengeance (1923). The New York Times film critic described Beery's character.

"Wallace Beery portrays the Duc de Tours, a cowardly brute. The coward has the legs of a hero and the head of a villain."

Beery was cast as supporting actor as a opium trafficker in the drama Drifting (1923), directed by Browning for Universal. Beery had the lead role as a violent Russian revolutionary in the drama Bavu (1923), released by Universal. He co-starred with Buster Keaton in the comedy Three Ages (1923) for Metro.

Beery played a supporting role as the villain in the Metro drama The Eternal Struggle (1923), a Mountie drama produced by Louis B. Mayer. Over the coming years, Mayer would be instrumental in the progress of Beery's career. He was reunited with Dean and Browning in the crime film White Tiger (1923)

Beery appeared in the mystery film The Drums of Jeopardy (1923) and had a supporting role in the adventure film The Sea Hawk (1924) for director Frank Lloyd. He also appeared in a supporting role for Clarence Brown's drama The Signal Tower (1925) starring Virginia Valli and Rockliffe Fellowes. In 1924, Beery married the actress Rita Gilman.

=== Paramount ===
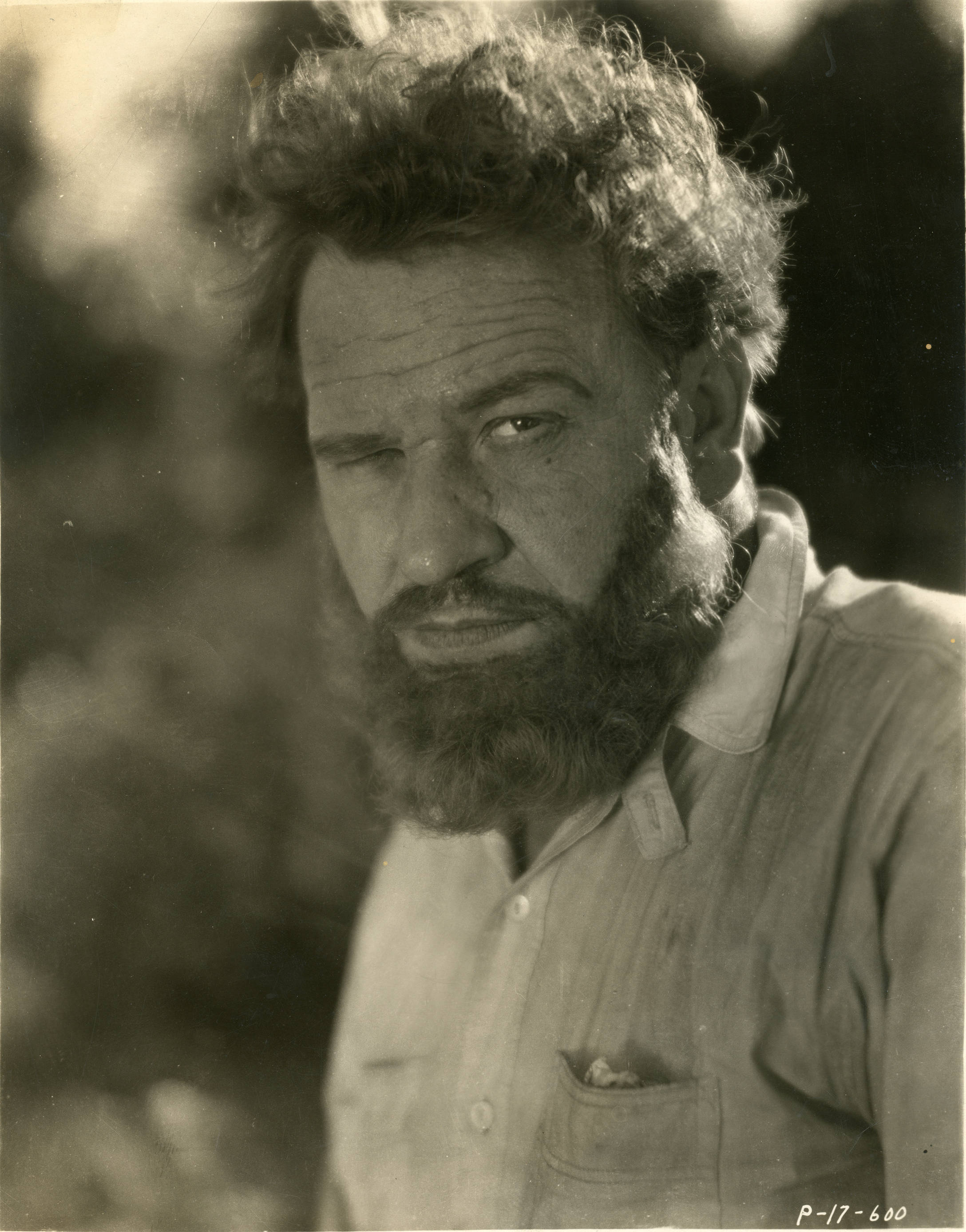
Beery as "Challenger" in The Lost World (1925)

Beery in 1925 signed a contract with Paramount Pictures. He had a support role in Adventure (1925) directed by Victor Fleming.

At First National, he was given the star role of "Professor Challenger" in the adaptation of Arthur Conan Doyle's novel, The Lost World (1925), arguably his silent performance most frequently screened in the modern era. Beery was top billed in Paramount's drama The Devil's Cargo (1925) for Victor Fleming, and supported in The Night Club (1925), The Pony Express (1925) for James Cruze, and The Wanderer (1925) for Raoul Walsh. During the filming of Coming Through (1925), a drama about a coal mine, Beery allegedly got drunk and fell down into a coal tipple at the set. However, he managed to escape injury.

Beery starred in a comedy with Raymond Hatton, Behind the Front (1926), and he was a villain in Volcano! (1926). He was a bosun mate in Old Ironsides (1926) for director James Cruze, with Charles Farrell in the romantic lead.

Beery had the title role in the baseball movie Casey at the Bat (1927). While at bat during one day of shooting, he was knocked unconscious by a pitch. However, Beery returned to work the next day. He was reunited with Hatton in Fireman, Save My Child (1927) and Now We're in the Air (1927). The latter also featured Louise Brooks, who was Beery's costar in Beggars of Life (1928), directed by William Wellman, which was Paramount's first part-talkie movie.

He made a fourth comedy with Hatton, Wife Savers (1929), then Beery starred in Chinatown Nights (1929) for Wellman, produced by a young David O. Selznick. This film was shot silent with the voices dubbed in by the actors afterward, which worked spectacularly well with Beery's resonant voice, although the technique was not used again during the silent era for another full-length feature. Beery then played in Stairs of Sand (1929), a Western also starring Jean Arthur. That same year, with talkie films dominating, Paramount fired Beery as part of its purge of silent film stars.

During the stock market crash of 1929, Beery reportedly lost $165,000 due to the failure of three banks that he used. That same year, a plane he owned crashed, killing his mechanic and two passengers.

=== MGM ===
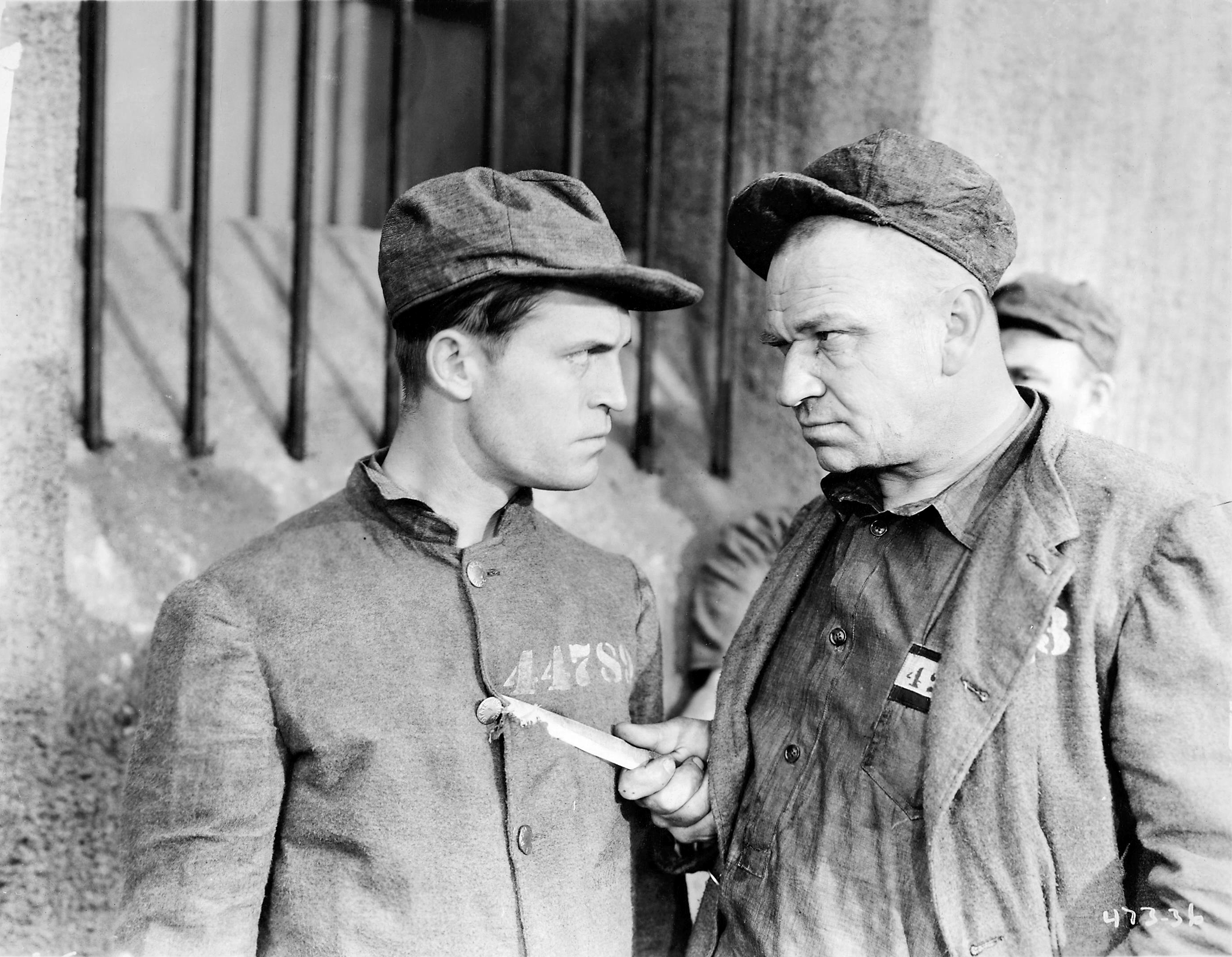
Chester Morris and Beery in The Big House (1930)

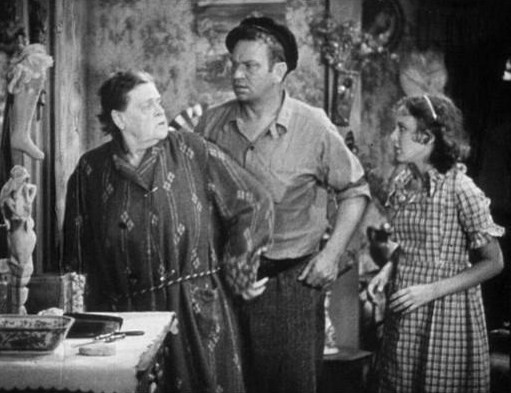
Beery with Marie Dressler in Min and Bill (1930)

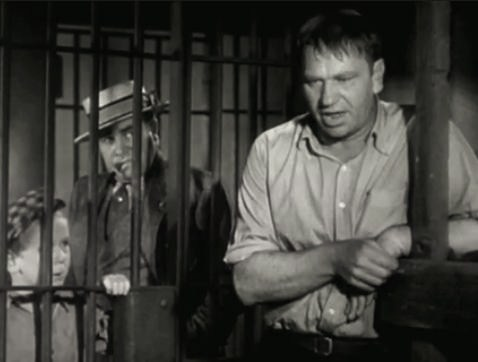
Jackie Cooper, Edward Brophy, and Beery in The Champ (1931)

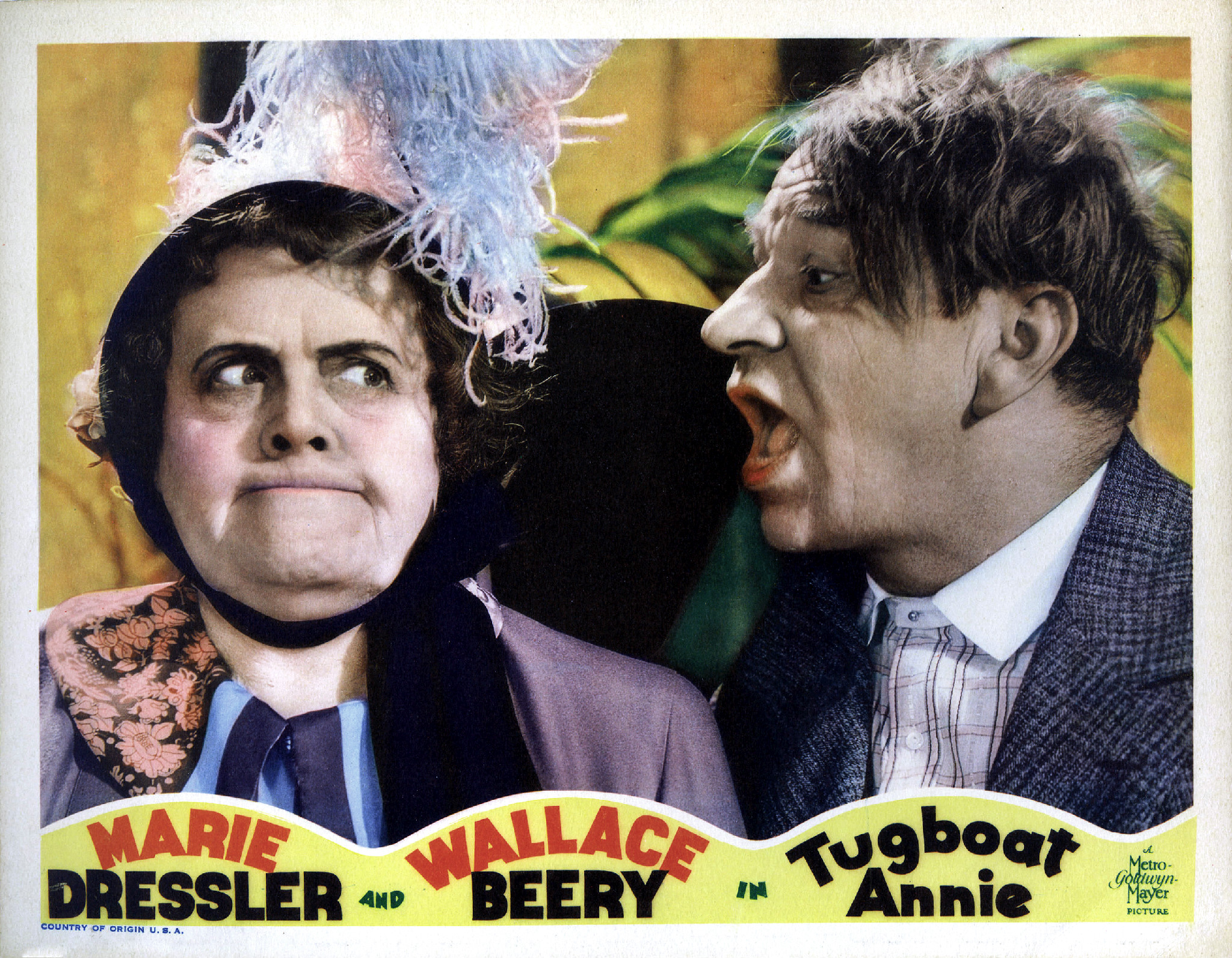
Dressler and Beery in Tugboat Annie (1933).

Producer Irving Thalberg in 1930 signed Beery to Metro-Goldwyn-Mayer (MGM) as a character actor. In his first film for MGM, Beery played the savage convict "Butch" in the highly successful 1930 prison film The Big House, directed by George W. Hill; Beery was nominated for the Academy Award for Best Actor for his performance.

Beery's second film for MGM was also a huge success: Billy the Kid (1930), an early widescreen western in which he played the lawman "Pat Garrett." He supported John Gilbert in the drama Way for a Sailor (1930) and Grace Moore in A Lady's Morals (1930), portraying "P. T. Barnum" in the latter.

==== Stardom ====
The picture that established Beery as one of the foremost film stars in the United States was the comedy Min and Bill (1930) with Marie Dressler. Directed by George W. Hill, the film was a sensational success. Beery made a third film with Hill, The Secret Six (1931), a gangster film with Jean Harlow and a young Clark Gable in key supporting roles.

One of Beery's most significant films was The Champ, which Beery made with child actor Jackie Cooper for director King Vidor. The film, especially written for Beery, was a box-office sensation. Beery shared the Best Actor Oscar for The Champ with Fredric March. Though March received one vote more than Beery, Academy rules at the time defined results within one vote of each other as "ties." One story was that MGM head Louis B. Mayer storming backstage at the Oscars ceremony, demanding that March and Beery share the award since the vote was so close. Beery was reportedly jealous of the attention that Cooper gained in The Champ. Beery amended his contract with MGM to prohibit close-up shots for child actors in any of his future films.

Beery's career went from strength to strength. Hell Divers (1932), a naval airplane epic with Gable billed under Beery, was a big hit. Another hit was the all-star drama Grand Hotel (1932), in which Beery was billed fourth, under Greta Garbo, John Barrymore, and Joan Crawford. This was one of the very few times he would not be top billed for the rest of his career. In 1932, Beery's contract with MGM stipulated that he be paid a dollar more than any other contract player at the studio, making him the world's highest-paid actor.

Beery played a German wrestler in Flesh (1932), a hit directed by John Ford. Next Beery was in another all-star ensemble blockbuster, Dinner at Eight (1933), with Jean Harlow as Beery's comically bickering wife. This time, Beery was billed third, under Marie Dressler and Barrymore.

Beery was lent to the new 20th Century Pictures for the boisterously fast-paced comedy/drama The Bowery (1933), also starring George Raft, Jackie Cooper, and Fay Wray, under the direction of Raoul Walsh. The picture was a smash hit.

Back at MGM, he played the title role of "Pancho Villa" in Viva Villa! (1933) and was reunited with Dressler in Tugboat Annie (1933), a massive hit. He played"Long John Silver" in Treasure Island (1934). The film was shot on Santa Catalina Island; Beery flew his own plane there every day from the mainland for his scenes. Treasure Island became MGM's third-largest hit of the season, and remains currently viewed as featuring one of Beery's iconic performances.

Beery returned to 20th Century Productions for The Mighty Barnum (1934), reprising his role as "P. T. Barnum". Back at MGM, he portrayed a kindly sergeant in West Point of the Air (1935) and was in an all-star spectacular, China Seas (1935), this time billed beneath Clark Gable. O'Shaughnessy's Boy (1935) reunited Beery and Jackie Cooper. Beery had the lead as the drunken uncle in MGM's adaptation of Ah, Wilderness! (1936), an adaptation of the Eugene O'Neil play. Berry went back to 20th Century – now 20th Century Fox – for the spy film A Message to Garcia (1936) with Barbara Stanwyck.

At MGM, he was in Old Hutch (1936) and The Good Old Soak (1937), then he was back at Fox for Slave Ship (1937), taking second billing under Warner Baxter. One scene in the filming of Slave Ship called for Beery to slap his ten-year-old co-star Mickey Rooney. Instead of faking the slap, Beery hit Rooney so hard that he fell to the floor, outraging the film crew. Director Tay Garnett privately advised Beery that if something like this incident happened again, he might find a stage light falling on his head.

Beery was cast in The Bad Man of Brimstone (1937) with Dennis O'Keefe and Noah Beery in a cameo role as a bartender. While filming it, Beery accidentally shot a blank cartridge into his knee with a prop gun, causing a bloody wound. He later remarked that riding the ambulance to the hospital was scarier than being shot.

==== Final films ====
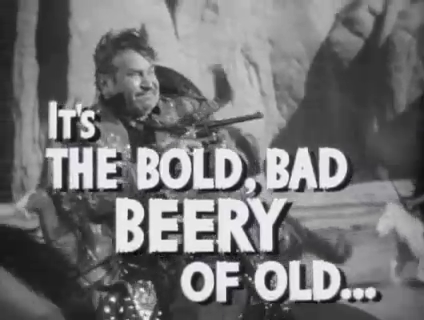
Beery in The Bad Man (1941)

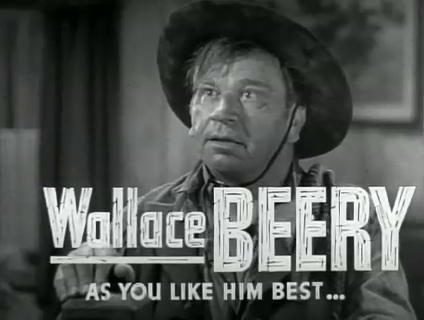
Beery in 20 Mule Team (1940)

===== 1938 and 1939 =====
In February 1938, Beery, his wife Rita Gilman and his daughter Carol Anne sailed to Europe for a month, with plans to visit France, Italy, Austria and Germany. After returning home, he filsm Port of Seven Seas (1938) with Maureen O'Sullivan, Stablemates (1938) with Mickey Rooney, Stand Up and Fight (1939) with Robert Taylor, Sergeant Madden (1939) with Tom Brown, Thunder Afloat (1939) with Chester Morris.

===== 1940 to 1949 =====
The Man from Dakota (1940) with Dolores del Río, and 20 Mule Team (1940) with Marjorie Rambeau, Anne Baxter, and Noah Beery Jr., enjoying top billing in all of them.

Wyoming (1940) teamed Beery with Marjorie Main. After The Bad Man (1941), also starred Lionel Barrymore and Ronald Reagan MGM reunited Beery and Main in Barnacle Bill (1941) and The Bugle Sounds (1941)

In 1942, Beery made only one film, the comedy western Jackass Mail (1942).. In Salute to the Marines (1943), a World War II drama, Beery played "Sgt. Maj. William Bailey", a retired US Marine who fights the Japanese invasion of the Philippines. A year later, Beery appeared in two films.

- Rationing (1944). Beery plays "Ben Barton", a small-town grocer who thwarts wartime profiteers.
- Barbary Coast Gent (1944), a western comedy in which Beery plays a bombastic con man. He was teamed with Binnie Barnes.

Beery in 1945 appeared in his last war film This Man's Navy as "Chief Aviation Pilot Ned Trumpet".Beery's next film, Bad Bascomb (1946), was a huge hit, helped primarily by the casting of Margaret O'Brien, then a child actor. Beery played "Roy "Slag" McGurk", a bar bouncer, in The Mighty McGurk (1947) with Dean Stockwell, also a child star. Alias a Gentleman (1947) was a romantic comedy in which Beery portrayed a former convict. It was the first of Beery's films to lose money over the past two decades. Beery received top billing for the hit A Date with Judy (1949), a popular musical featuring 17-year-old Elizabeth Taylor.

Beery's last film was the western Big Jack (1949), in which he played "Big Jack Horner". It also lost money. Beery died three days after the film's premiere.

=== Working relationship with peers ===
Jackie Cooper (1931)

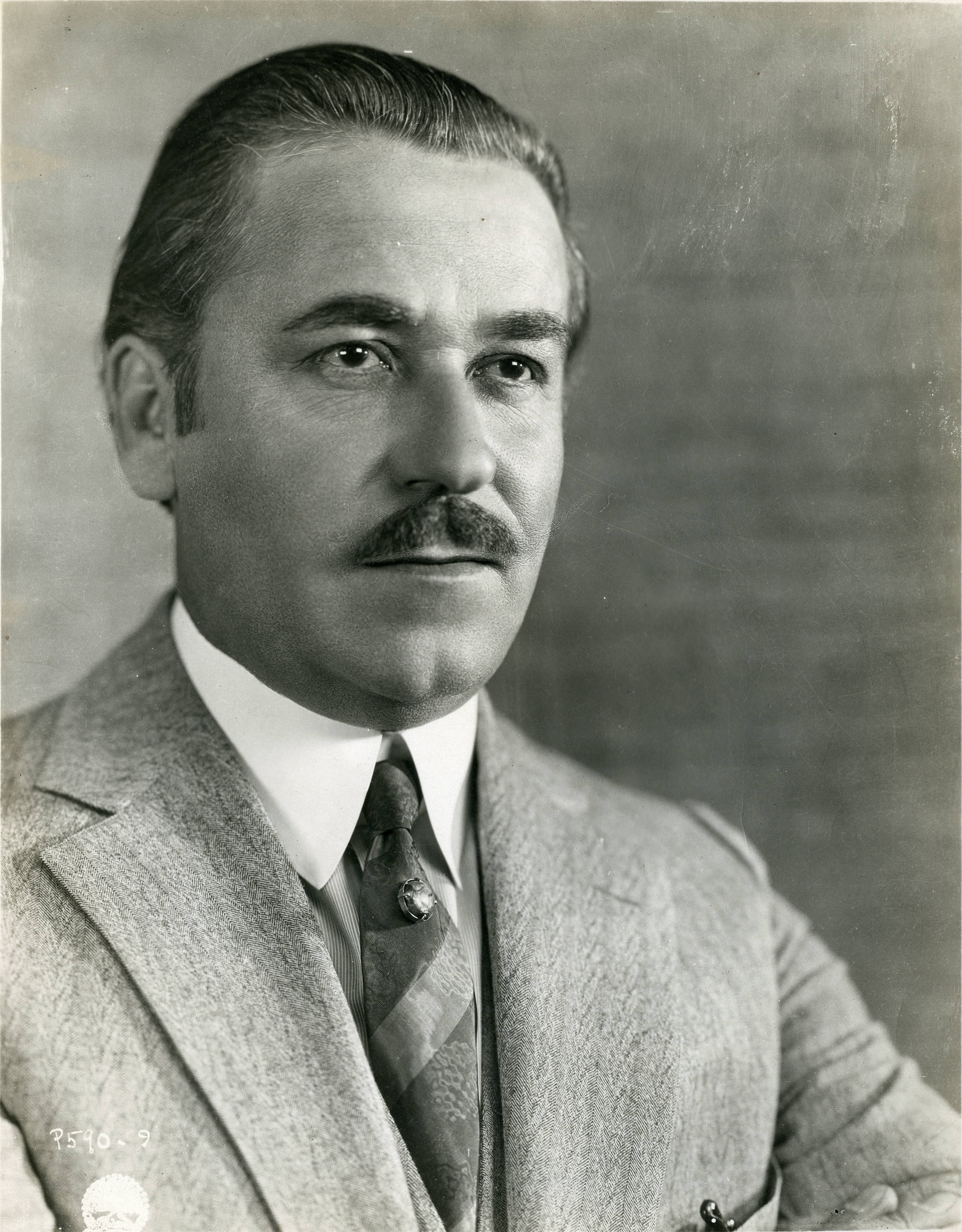
Brother Noah Beery in 1925

According to Louis Meyer biographer, Scott Eyman, Beery was not a popular man. Many of his colleagues at MGM considered him misanthropic and difficult to work with. The actor Robert Young described Beery as a "shitty person". Beery often neglected to learn his lines. While filming, he tried to steal other actor's lines, then get defensive when he was caught. When prompting for another actor's close-up, Beery would read the wrong lines, making it harder for his co-stars to meet their marks. Beery was "loathed by everybody, and happily oblivious."

Swanson reportedly said that Beery had been invited to every fashionable home in Beverly Hills - once!

Mickey Rooney was one of Beery's few MGM co-star to praise him. In his memoir, Rooney described Beery as

"... a lovable, shambling kind of guy who never seemed to know that his shirttail belonged inside his pants, but always knew when a little kid actor needed a smile and a wink or a word of encouragement."

Rooney did concede that "not everyone loved [Beery] as much as I did." Rooney noted that Howard Strickling, MGM's head of publicity, once went to Louis B. Mayer to complain that Beery was stealing props from the studio's sets. "And that wasn't all", Rooney continued.

"He [Strickling] went on for some minutes about the trouble that Beery was always causing him ... Mayer sighed and said, 'Yes, Howard, Beery's a son of a bitch. But he's our son of a bitch.' Strickling got the point. A family has to be tolerant of its black sheep, particularly if they brought a lot of money into the family fold, which Beery certainly did."

Jackie Cooper, who made several films with Beery as a child actor, called him "a big disappointment." Cooper accused Beery of upstaging him and making other attempts to undermine his performances, presumably out of jealousy. After filming one heartfelt scene, Cooper impulsively threw his arms around Beery after one especially heartfelt scene. Beery reacted by gruffly pushing him away.After Beery's death, Cooper reportedly said, "They couldn't find eight guys to carry his casket."

Margaret O'Brien, who co-starred with Beery at age nine in Bad Bascomb (1946), stated that she got along with him. However, she claimed that crew members had to stop Beery from constantly pinching her.

== Personal life ==
=== Marriages and children ===
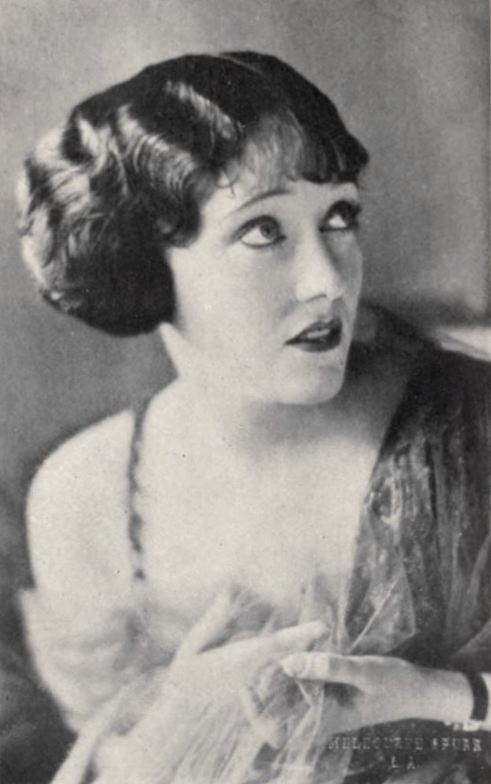
Gloria Swanson (1922)

==== First marriage ====
On March 27, 1916, at age 30, Beery married 17-year-old actress Gloria Swanson in Los Angeles. The two had co-starred in Sweedie Goes to College. According to Swanson's autobiography, Beery raped her on their wedding night. Although Beery had enjoyed popularity with his Sweedie shorts, he was forced during this time to rely on Swanson as the main breadwinner. After learning she was pregnant, Beery allegedly tricked her into swallowing an abortifacient, causing her to abort the fetus. Swanson filed for divorce in 1917 and it was finalized in 1918.

==== Second marriage and adoption ====
On August 4, 1924, Beery married actress Rita Gilman (née Mary Areta Gilman; 1898–1986) in Los Angeles. The couple adopted Carol Ann Priester (1930–2013), the daughter of Rita's aunt, Juanita Priester. After 14 years of marriage to Beery, Gilman filed for divorce in May 1939, in Carson City, Nevada. Within 20 minutes of filing for divorce, she won the decree. Gilman remarried 15 days later.

==== Second adoption ====
According to Time Magazine, Beery in 1939 adopted a seven-month-old girl, Phyllis Ann Beery. Phyllis appeared in MGM publicity photos when adopted, but was never mentioned again. Beery told the press he had assumed care of the girl in from a single mother who was recently divorced, but he had filed no official adoption papers.

==== Lawsuits ====
===== Schumm paternity suit =====
On February 13, 1948, actress Gloria Schumm filed a paternity suit against Beery. Beery had known Schumm for about 15 years; she had played minor roles in six of his films. In the lawsuit, Schumm said that she and Beery had sexual relations on one occasion in May 1947. At the time, Beery was still married to Rita Gilman,. After learning she was pregnant, Schumm met with Beery at his home. He gave her contact information of a physician to examine her. She asked Beery to marry her to "legitimatize the expected child" (her words), but he refused. In August 1947, in an oral agreement Beery agreed to provide at least $25,000 for the child after he was born.

Schumm gave birth in February 1948, to Johan Richard Wallace Schumm However, Beery's lawyer only offered Gloria Schumm a $6,000 financial settlement. Schumm refused the settlement and went to court. The paternity suit was heard in court after Beery's 1949 death. Schumm's attorneys demanded $104,135 from Beery's $2,220,000 estate. In February 1952, Judge Newcomb Condee approved a $26,750 financial settlement for Schumm.

===== Whitney lawsuit =====
In 1941, Beery was sued for $600,000 for false arrest by 28-year-old Allan Whitney. When the plaintiff was 15, Beery brought him to live in his home as a possible adoption. However, Beery later ordered Whitney to leave the premises. Whitney claimed that Beery in 1941 falsely called the police to have him arrested. However, Noah Berry testified that he called the police because Whitney was loitering around the Wallace home. The case was ultimately dismissed.

===== Montanya lawsuit =====
In 1927, 19-year-old film actress Juanita Montanya sued Beery for $1 million. She claimed that he had raped her while she was staying with Beery and his wife Rita. Montanya also claimed that he was the father of her child. Beery denied the charges.

=== Ted Healy altercation ===
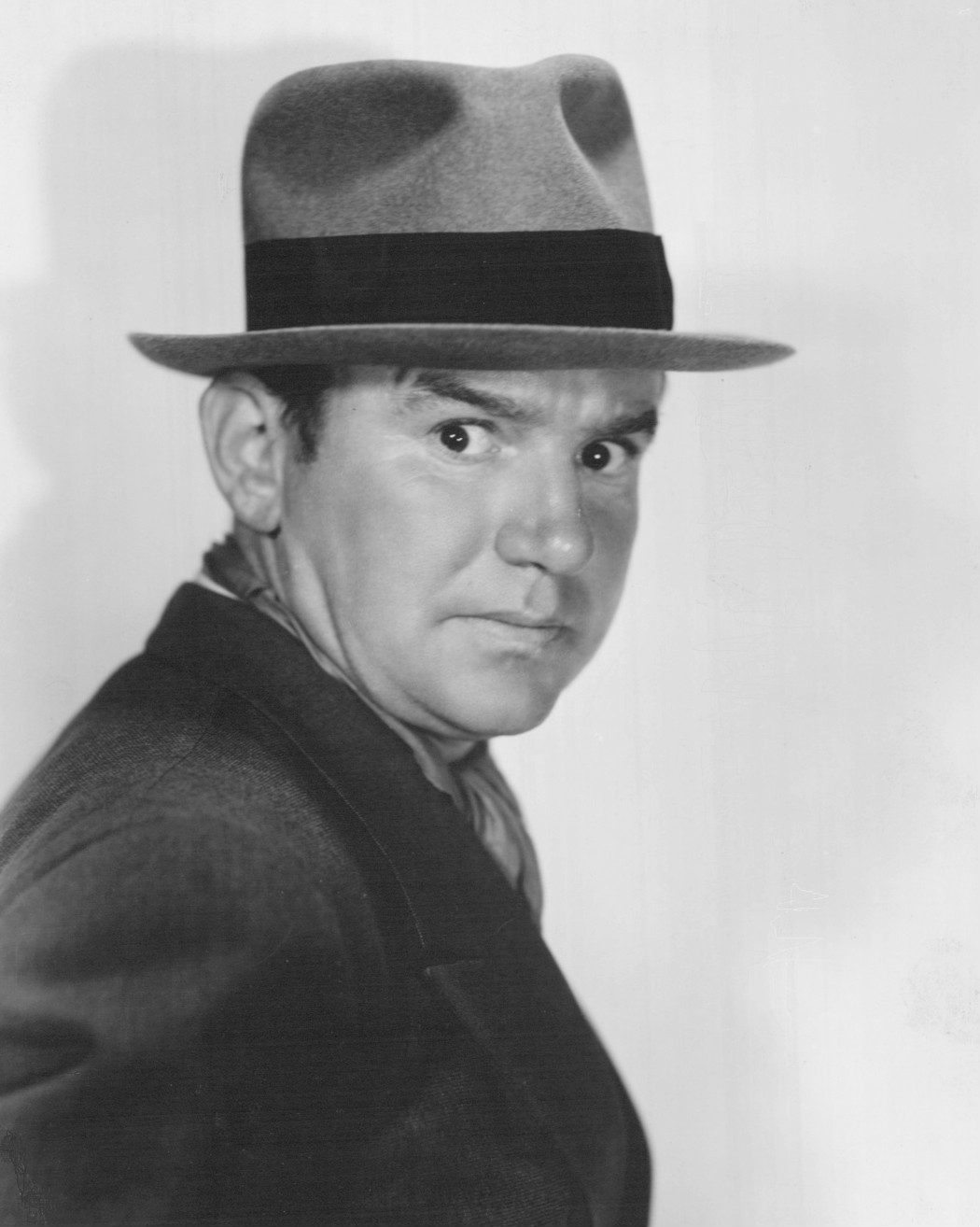
Ted Healy (1937)

In December 1937, comedic actor and Three Stooges founder Ted Healy was involved in a drunken altercation at Cafe Trocadero on the Sunset Strip in Hollywood. E. J. Fleming, in his 2005 book, The Fixers: Eddie Mannix, Howard Strickling and the MGM Publicity Machine, asserts that Healy was attacked by three men: future James Bond producer Albert "Cubby" Broccoli, local mob figure Pat DiCicco and Beery. Fleming claims that this beating caused Healy's death several days later.

Contemporaneous news reports do not confirm that either Beery or DiCicco was present that night at the Trocadero. Broccoli did admit that he and Healy got into in a fistfight. The official autopsy names Healy's cause of death as acute toxic nephritis secondary to acute and chronic alcoholism.

=== Hobbies ===
Beery owned and flew his own planes, including a Howard DGA-11. On April 15, 1933, he was commissioned a lieutenant commander in the United States Navy Reserve at NRAB Long Beach. One of his proudest achievements was catching the largest giant black sea bass in the world — 515 pounds (234 kg) — off Santa Catalina Island in 1916, a record that stood for 35 years.

During the filming of Old Ironsides off the California coast in 1926, Beery purchased a 40 feet (12 m) yacht to sail to the shooting location every day. On one occasion he was in a rowboat that capsized in rough seas. Beery climbed onto the hull and waiting for rescue. When another boat appeared and the occupants asked if he had capsized, Beery replied, "Naw, the boat was a little dirty and I'm washing it."

=== Politics and activism ===
In 1943, President Franklin D. Roosevelt signed an executive order creating Jackson Hole National Monument to protect the land adjoining the Grand Tetons in Wyoming. Local ranchers, outraged at the loss of grazing lands, compared Roosevelt's action to Adolf Hitler's annexation of Austria in 1938. Led by an aging Beery, the ranchers protested by herding 500 cattle across the monument lands without a permit.

Beery supported Thomas Dewey in the 1944 United States presidential election.

=== Death ===
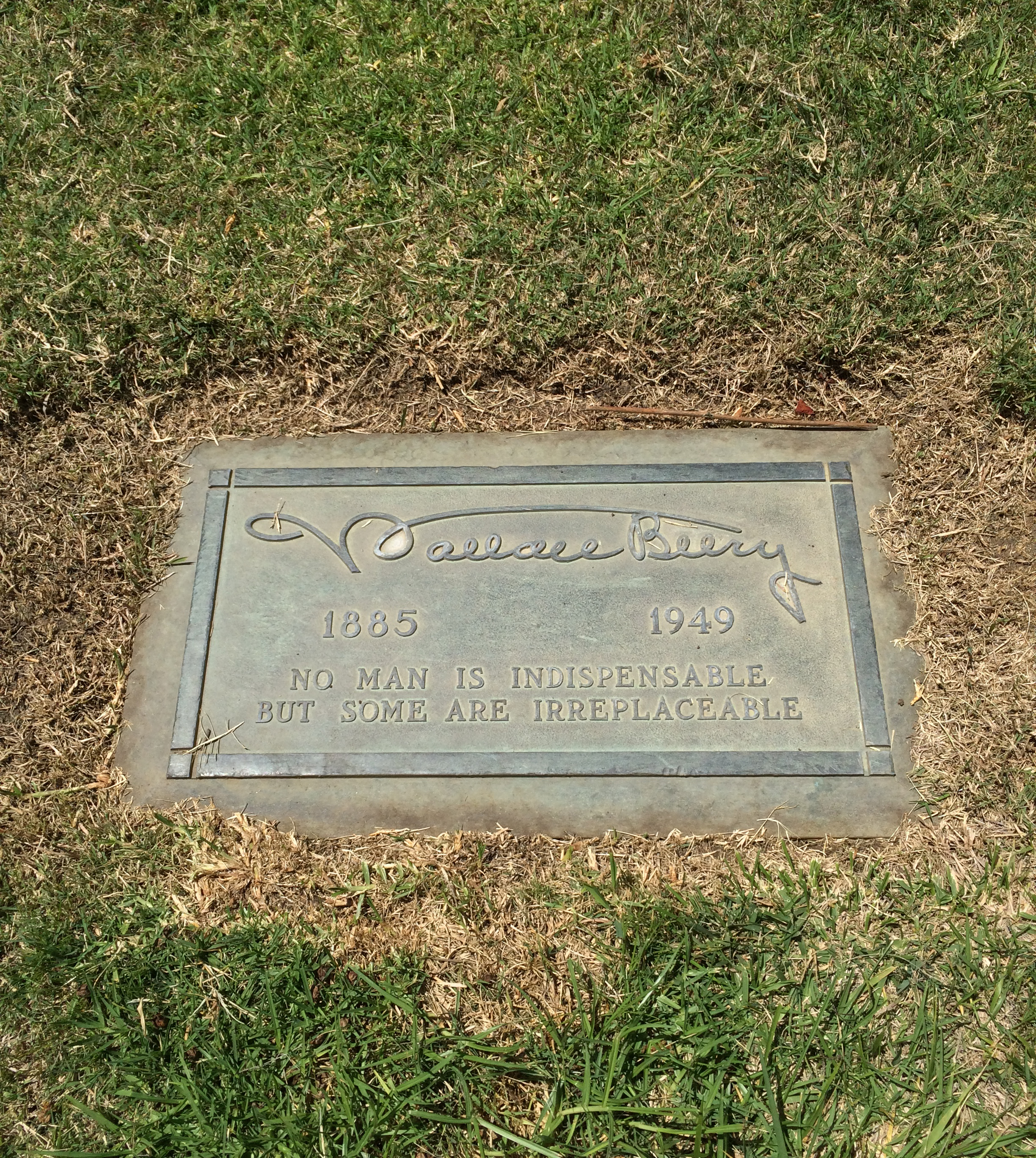
Beery gravesite, Forest Lawn Memorial Park, Glendale, California

Beery suffered a heart attack in November 1948 and was admitted to California Lutheran Hospital in Los Angeles. He told reporters that he first noticed heart problems six months earlier when he was trying to crank a cold motor at his cabin in Wyoming.

On April 15, 1949, Beery dined alone at Romanoff's, a popular restaurant in Beverly Hills for the movie industry. After returning home, he was reading the paper when he collapsed around 10:00 pm. A doctor was called to the house; he pronounced Beery deceased due to cardiac arrest. The funeral service was held at the Church of the Recessional at Forest Lawn Memorial Park in Glendale, California. Over 2,000 people attended the service and Louis B. Mayer was one of his pallbearers.

Beery's body was interred at Forest Lawn. The inscription on his grave reads, "No man is indispensable, but some are irreplaceable."When Joe Yule, the actor father of Mickey Rooney, died a few months later, Rooney had him buried next to Beery, his old friend. "I thought it was fitting that these two comedians should rest in peace, side by side," Rooney wrote.

== Legacy ==
- Beery received a motion-picture star on the Hollywood Walk of Fame in 1960, located at 7001 Hollywood Boulevard.
- Beery is mentioned in an episode of the TV comedy The Golden Girls (1985 to 1992). Estelle Getty, playing "Sofia",compares Beery with Adolphe Menjou, a film star of the same era.
- Beery is mentioned in the comedy film Barton Fink (1991). The lead character is hired to write a wrestling screenplay starring Beery. It is called "a Wallace Beery wrestling picture".
- In the HBO dramatic series The Sopranos (1999 to 2007), episode "House Arrest" (S2 EP11), mobster Richie Aprile makes a disparaging comment about mob boss Tony Soprano to his uncle, Junior Soprano. Aprile says "You should see him [Tony] in the golf outfit, he looked like Wallace Beery".
- In the HBO dramatic series Boardwalk Empire (2010 to 2014) season 5, episode 4 ("Cuanto"), New York mobster Lucky Luciano mocks Chicago gangster Al Capone, calling him the "Italian Wallace Beery". The insult triggers a fit of violent rage in Capone.
- The film Hail, Caesar! (2016) features a mockingly named "Wallace Beery Conference Room" in a Hollywood studio.

== Filmography ==
=== Box office ranking ===
- 1932 – 7th
- 1933 – 5th
- 1934 – 4th
- 1935 – 8th
- 1936 – 15th, 8th (UK)
- 1937 – 15th
- 1938 – 12th
- 1939 – 15th
- 1940 – 8th
- 1941 – 19th
- 1942 – 18th
- 1943 – 18th
- 1944 – 11th
- 1946 – 11th
Gallery of Beery Images

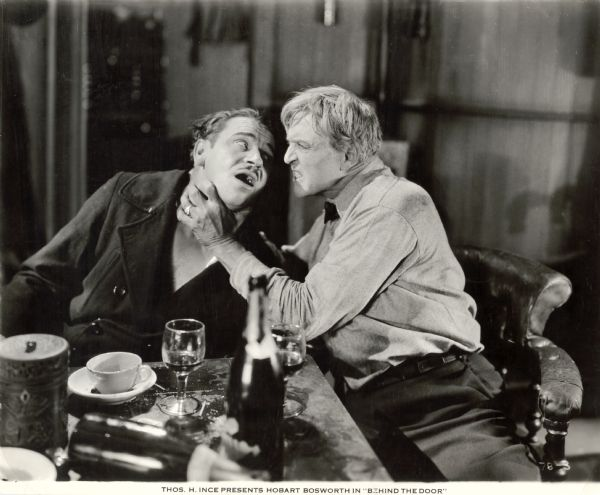
Behind the Door (1919)

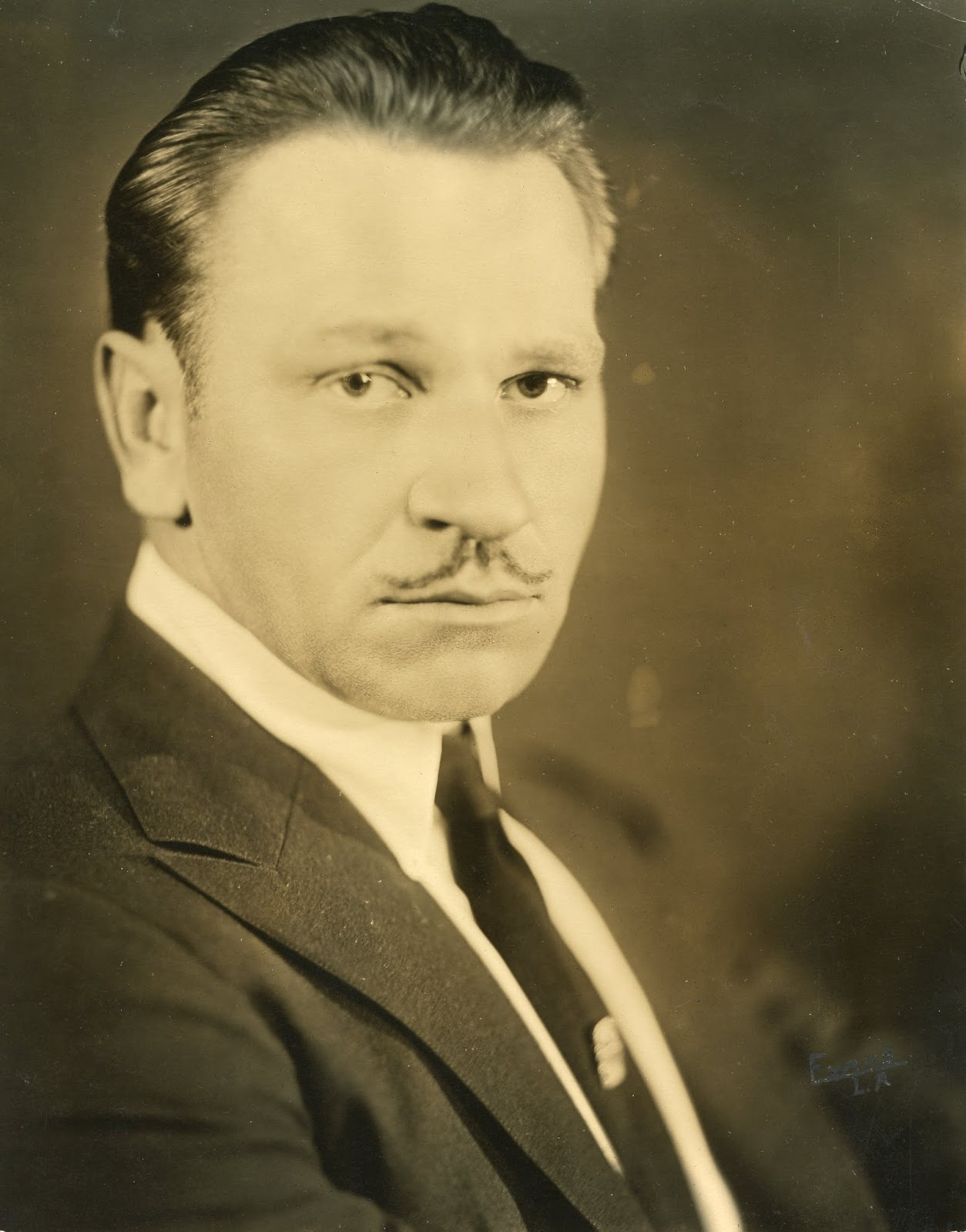
Beery in 1921

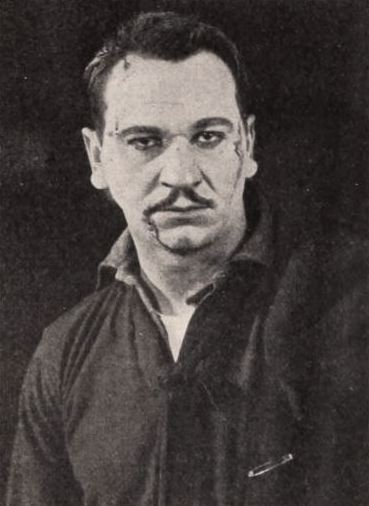
The Policeman and the Baby (1921)

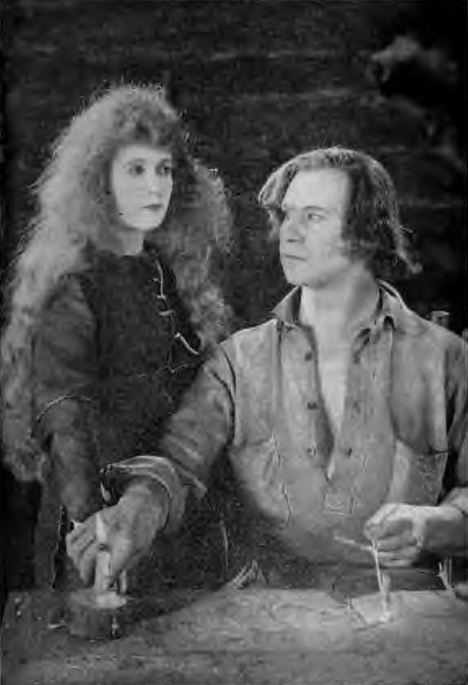
The Golden Snare (1921)

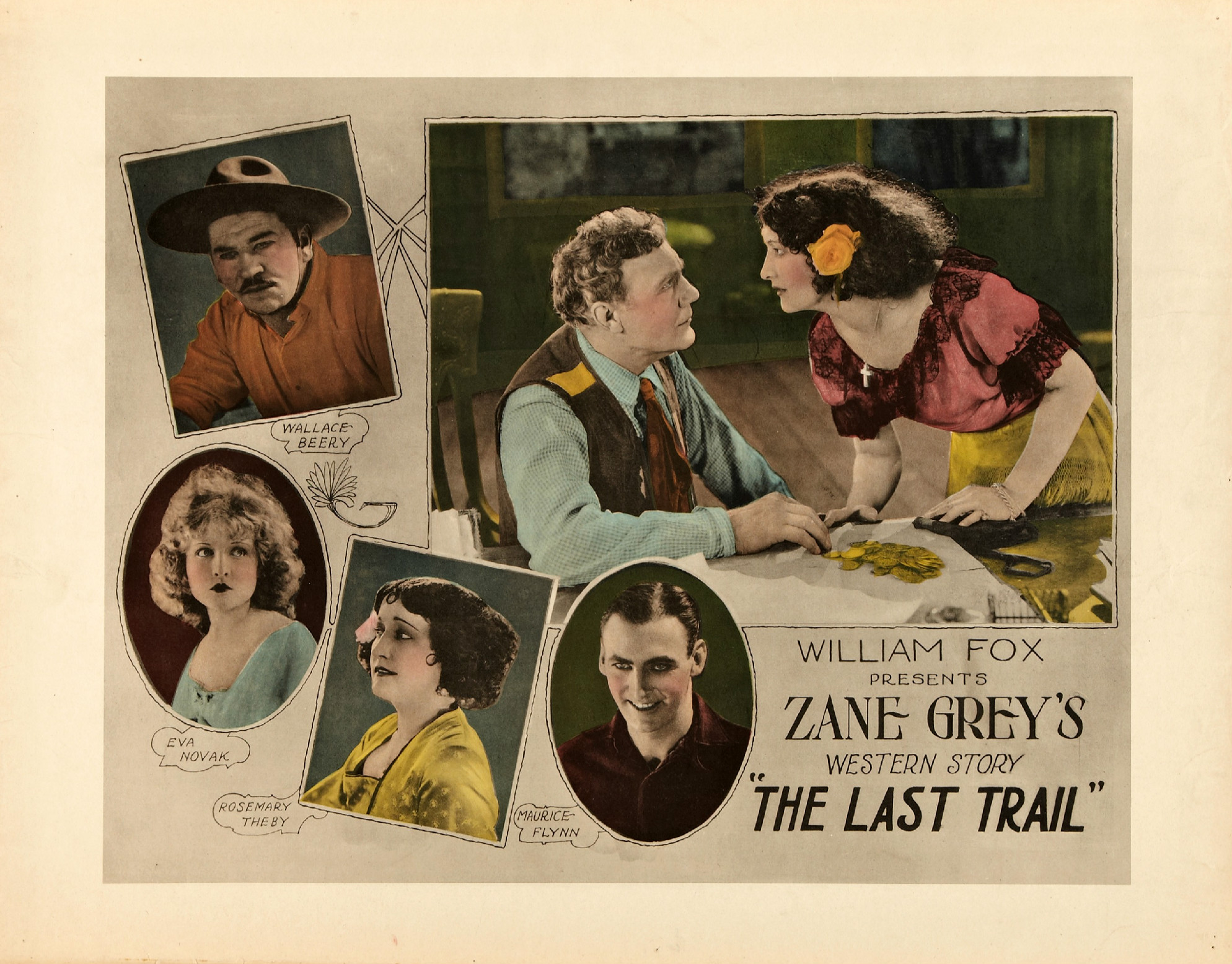
The Last Trail (1921)

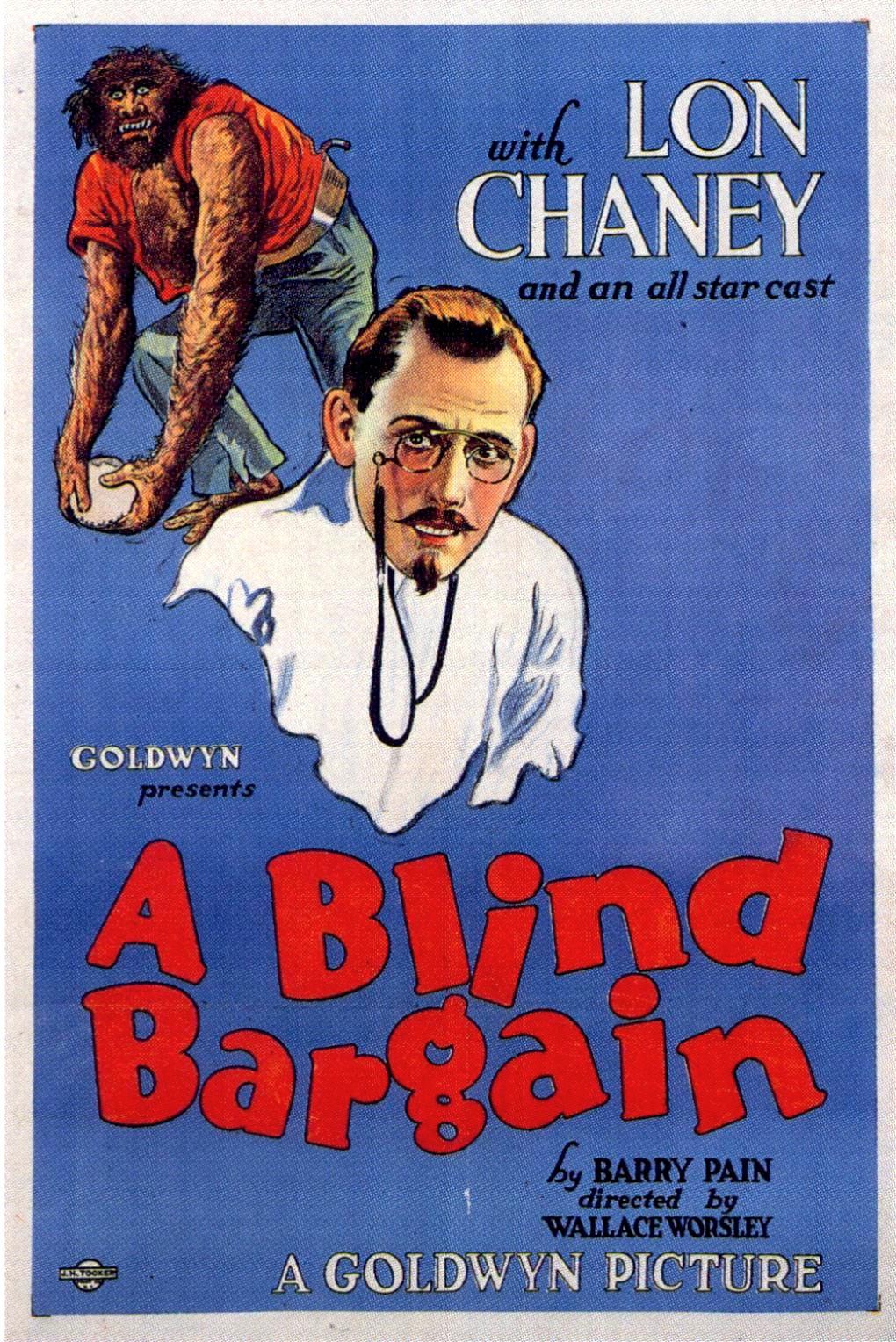
A Blind Bargain (1922) with Lon Chaney

Stormswept (1923) with Noah Beery Sr.

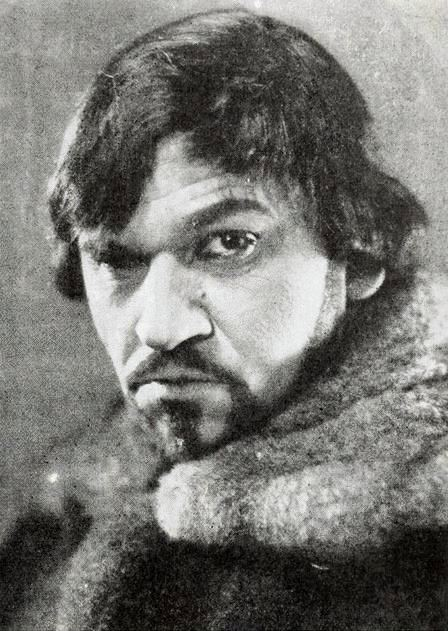
Beery as Bavu (1923)

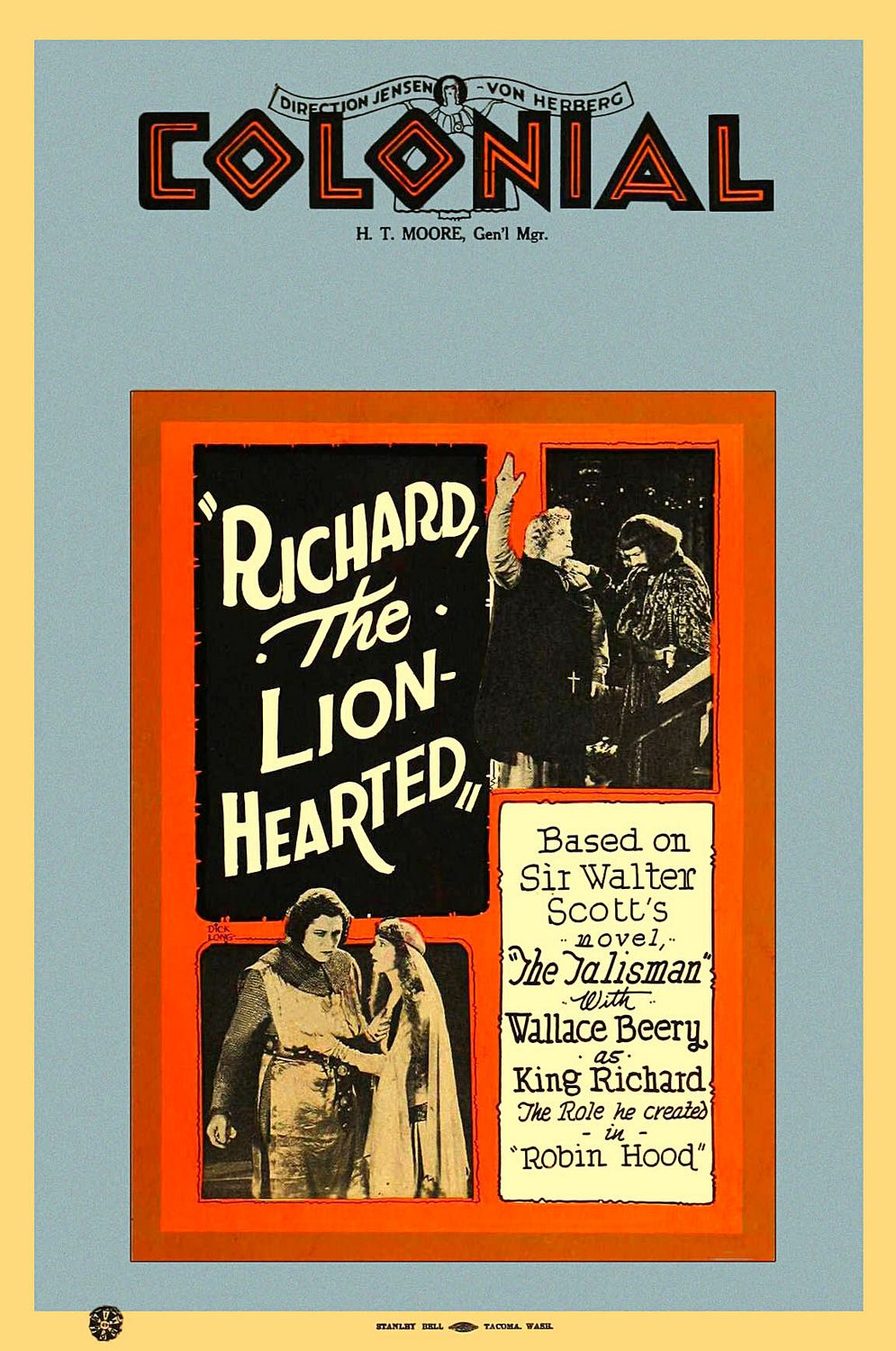
Richard the Lion-Hearted (1923)

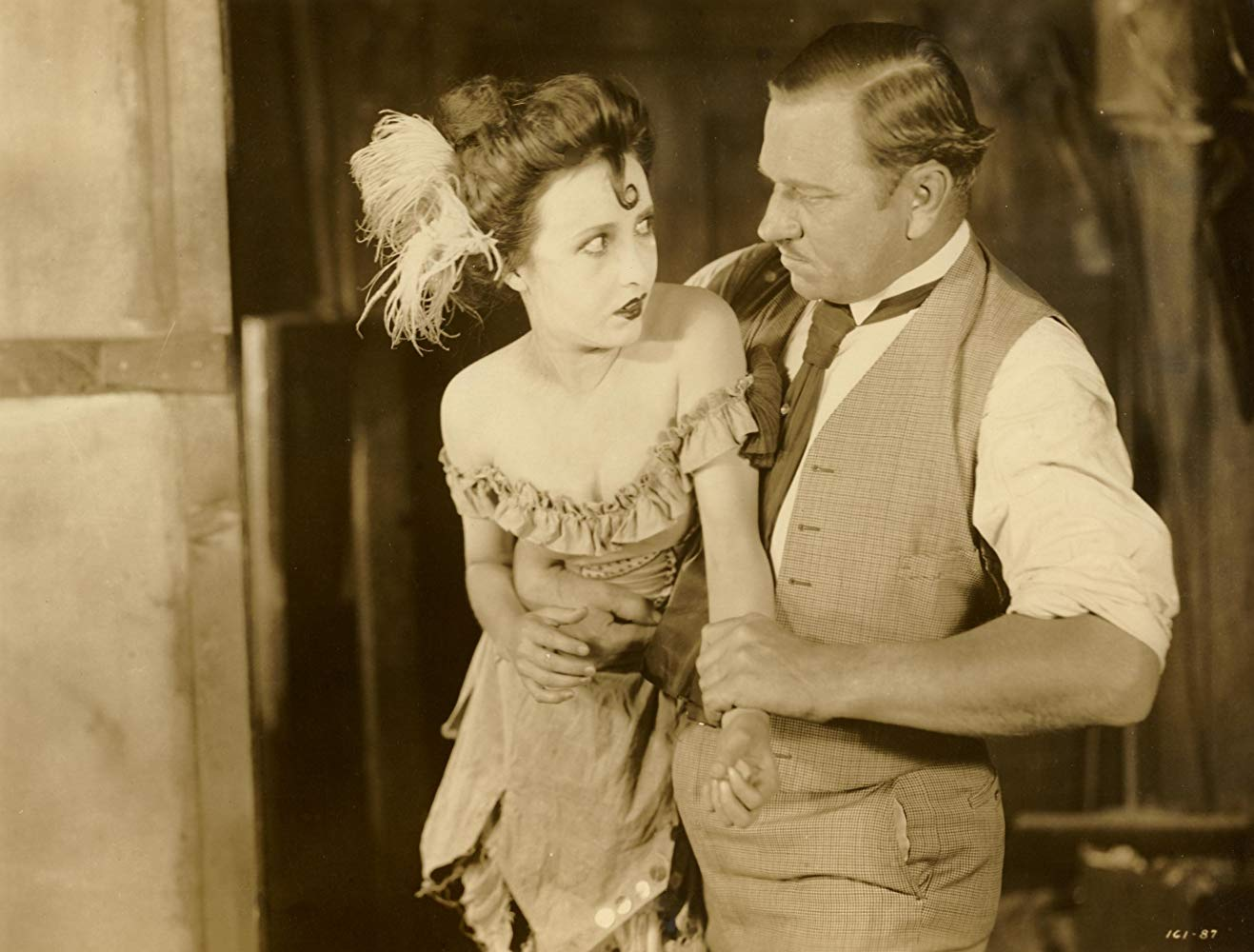
Dynamite Smith (1924) with Bessie Love

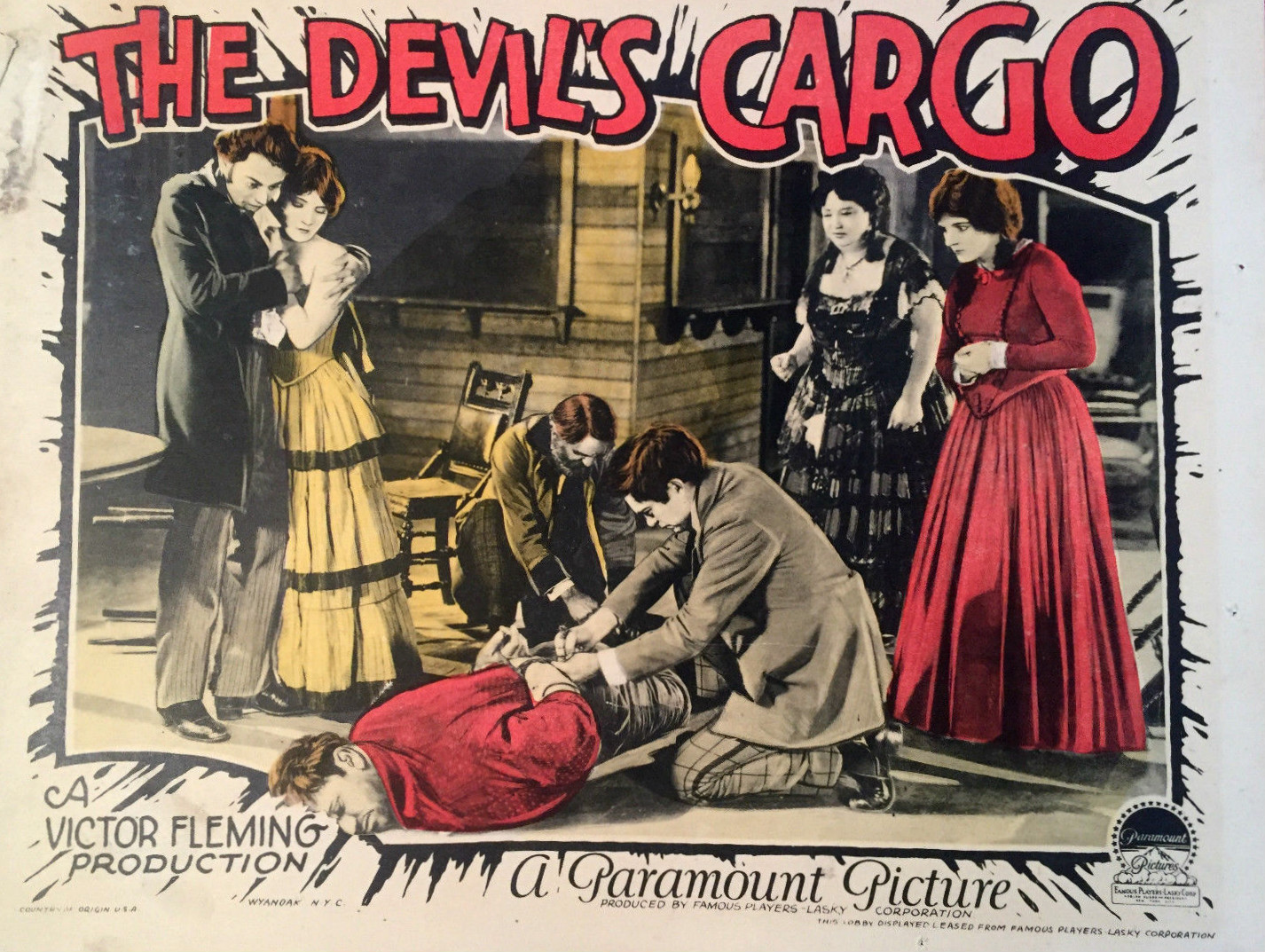
The Devil's Cargo (1925)

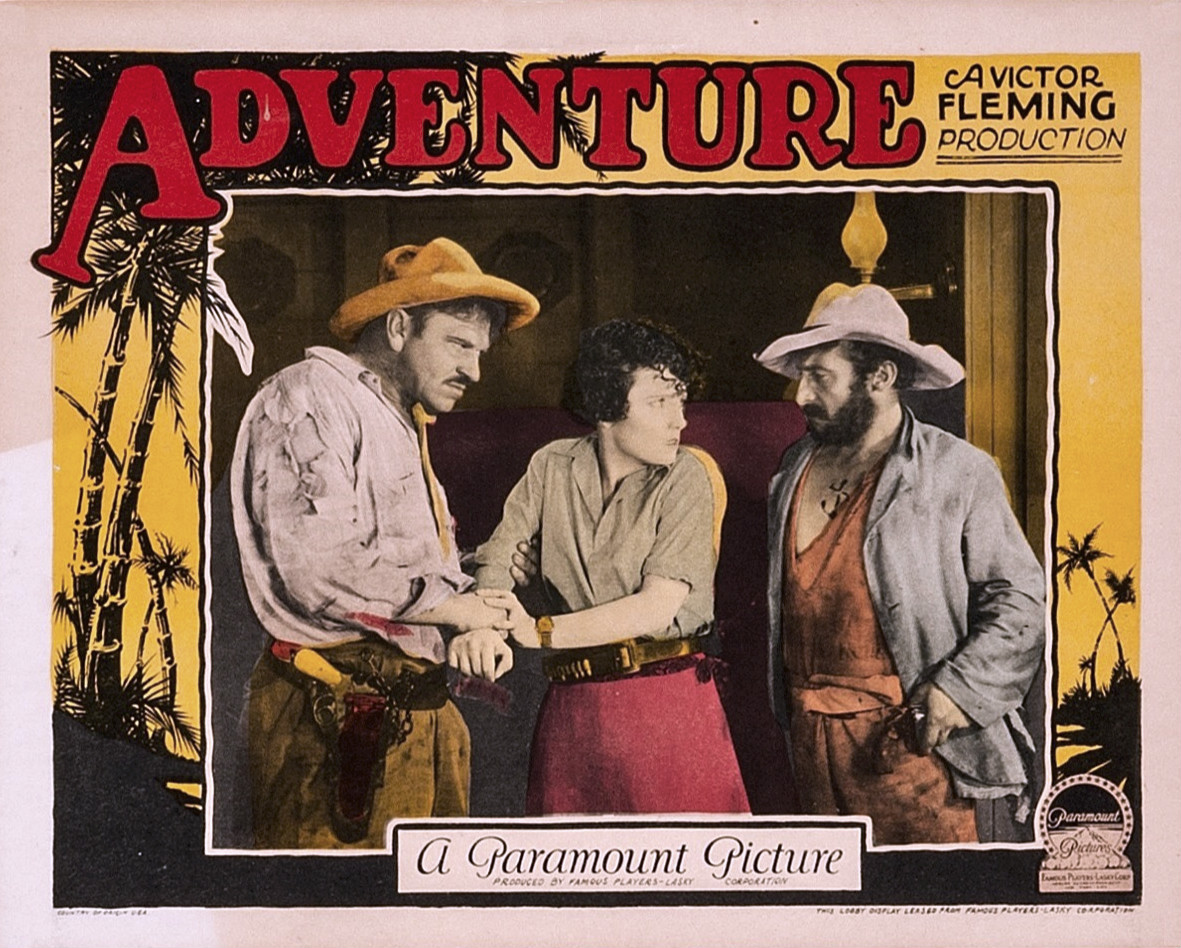
Adventure (1925) with Pauline Starke

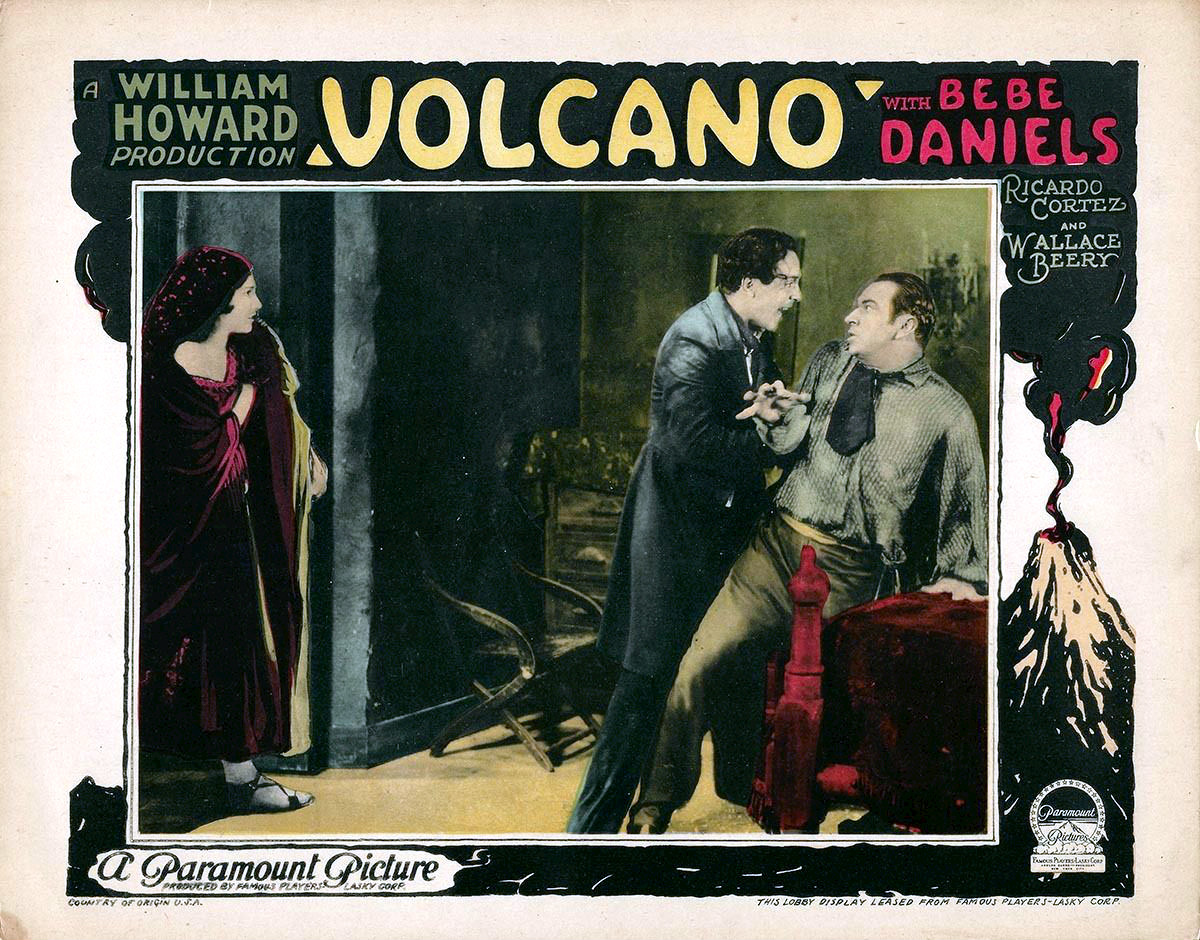
Volcano! (1926) with Bebe Daniels
and Ricardo Cortez

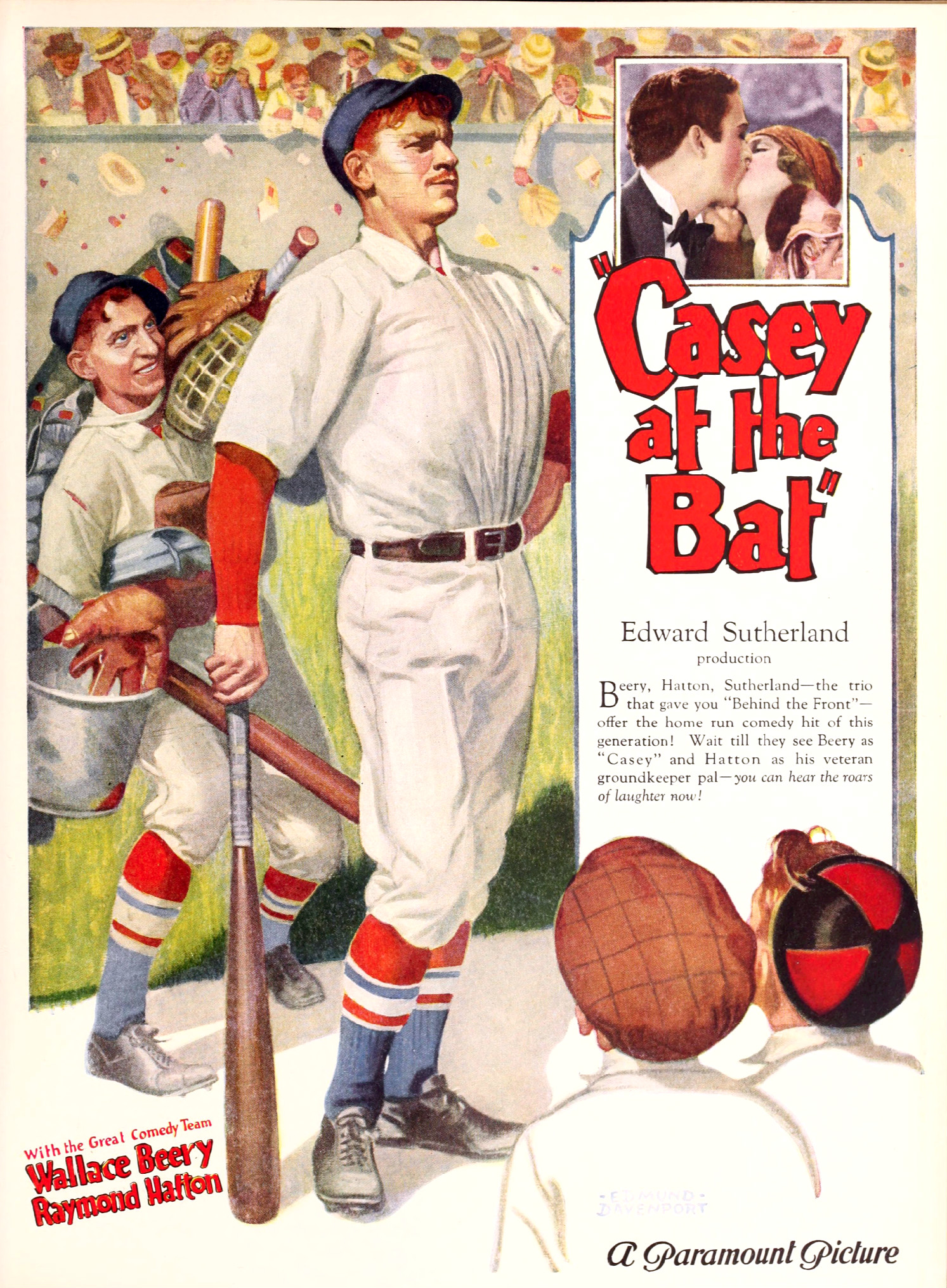
Casey at the Bat (1927)

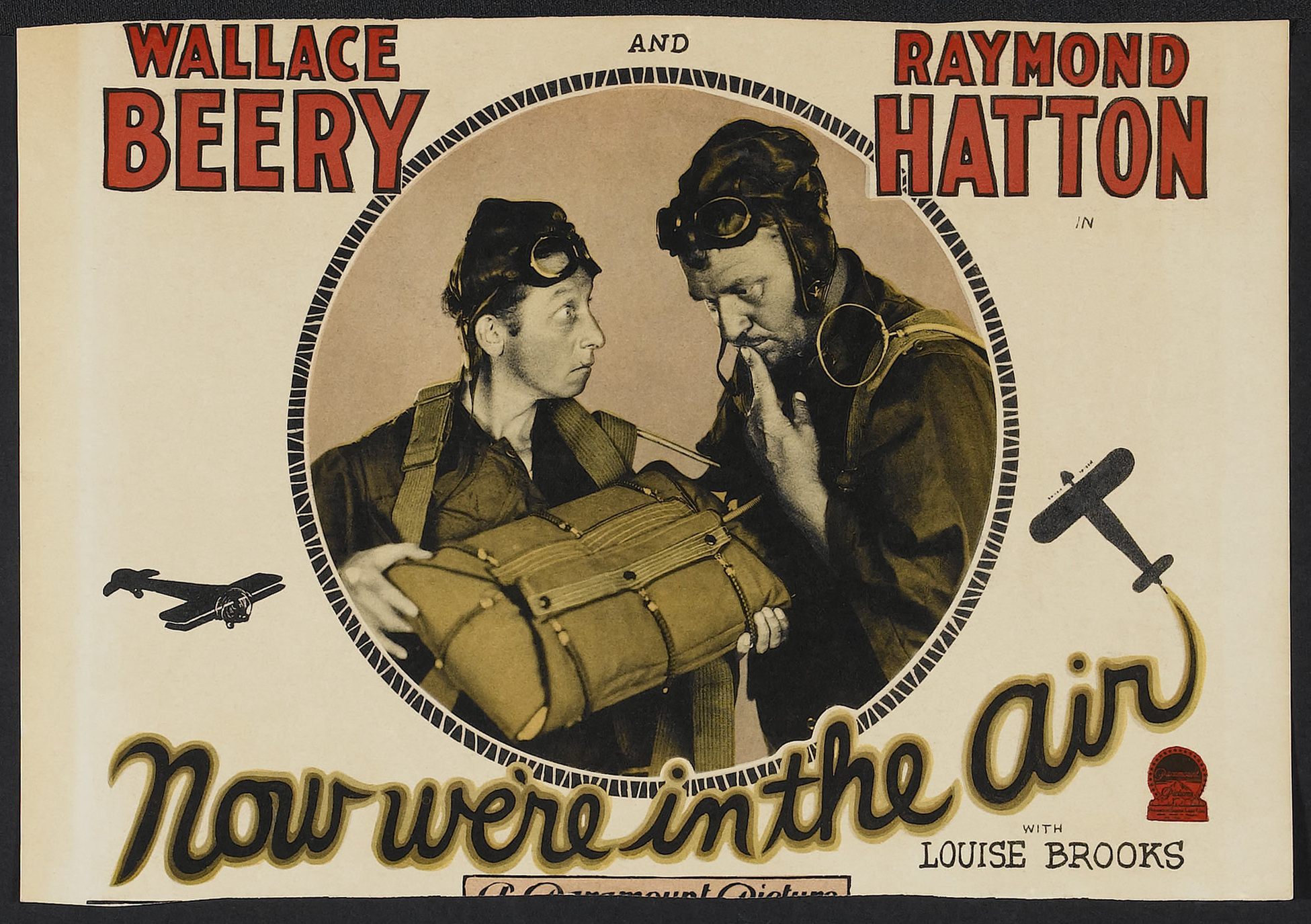
Now We're in the Air (1927) with Raymond Hatton

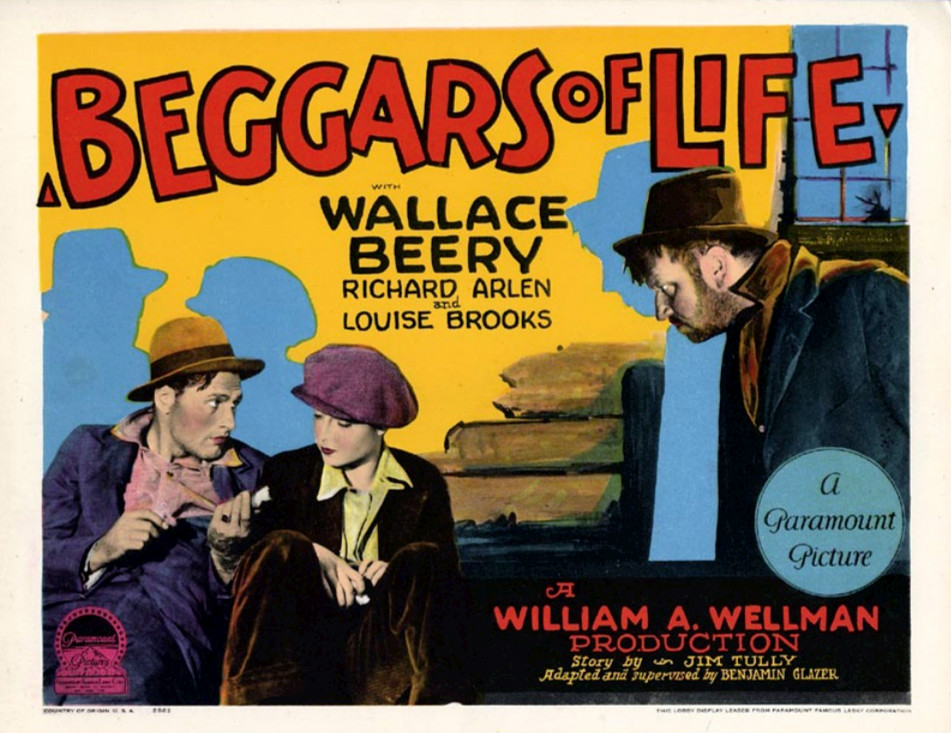
Beggars of Life (1928) with Louise Brooks

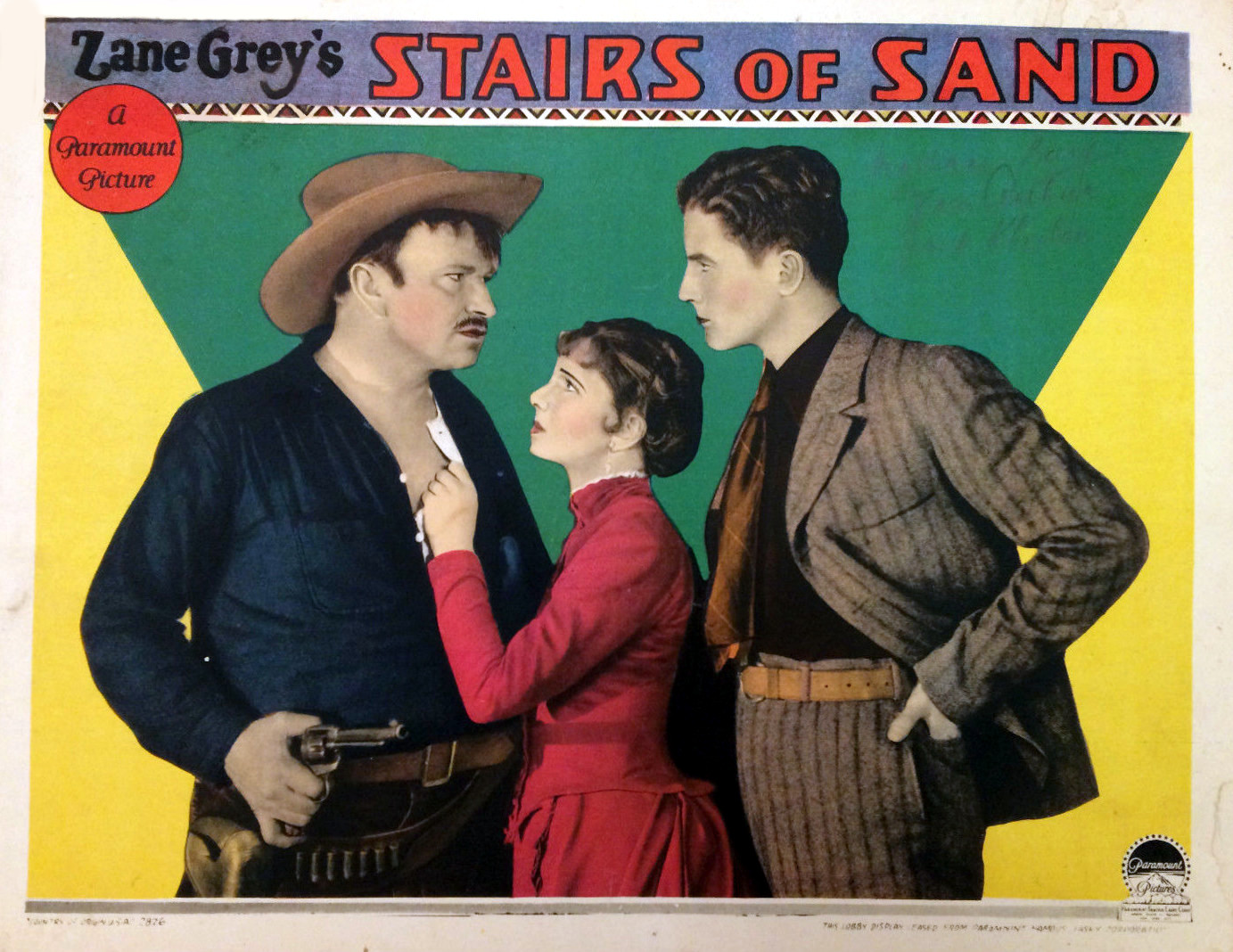
Stairs of Sand (1929) with Jean Arthur

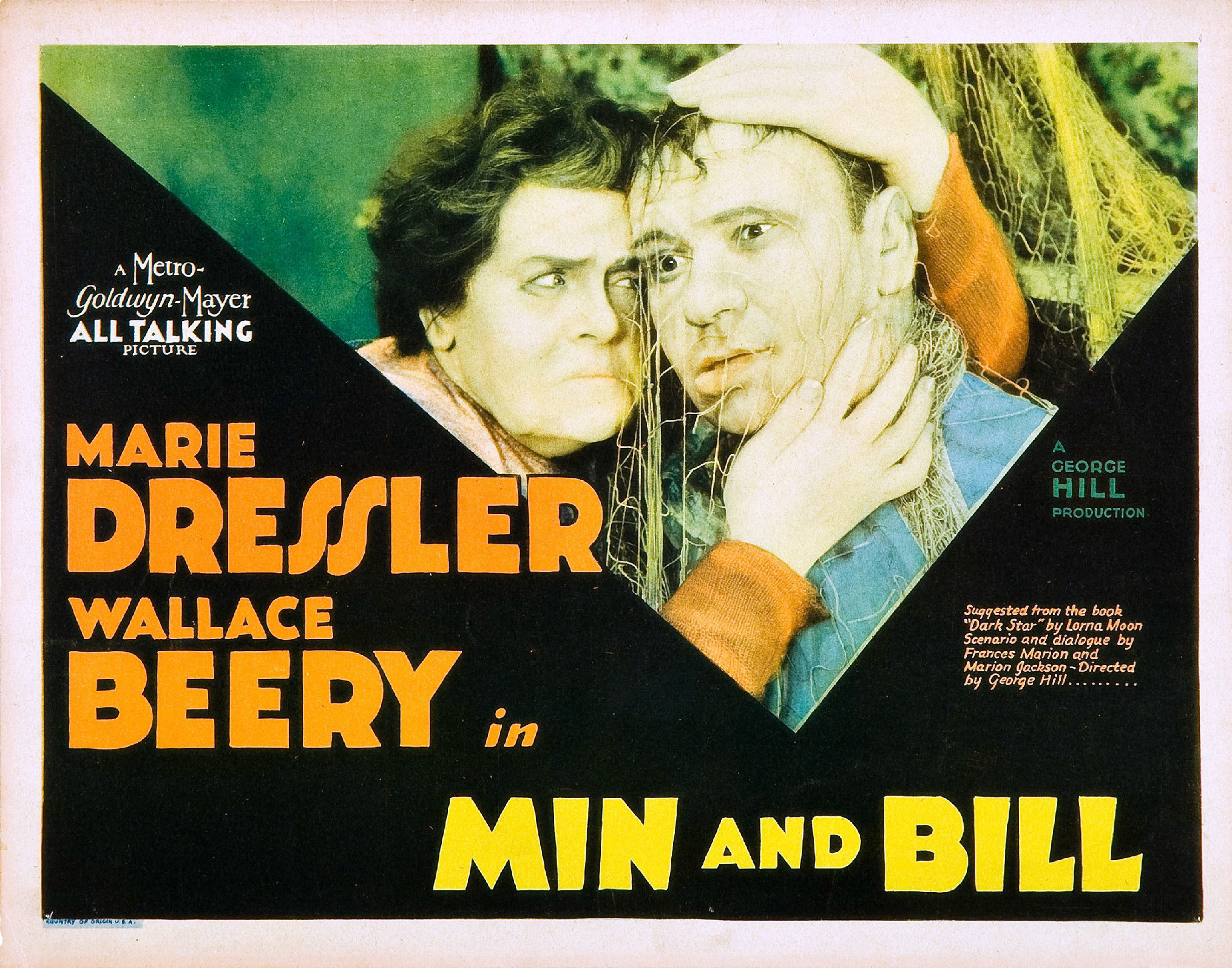
Min and Bill (1930) with Marie Dressler

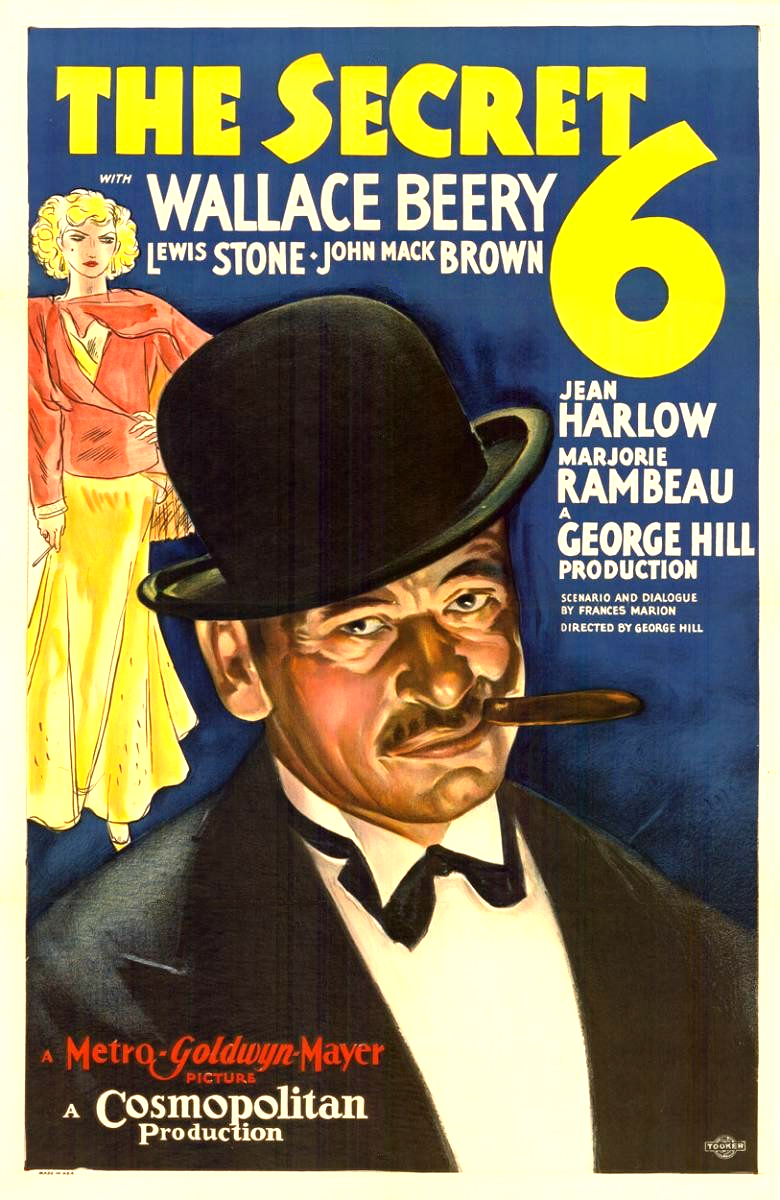
The Secret Six (1931) with Jean Harlow and Clark Gable

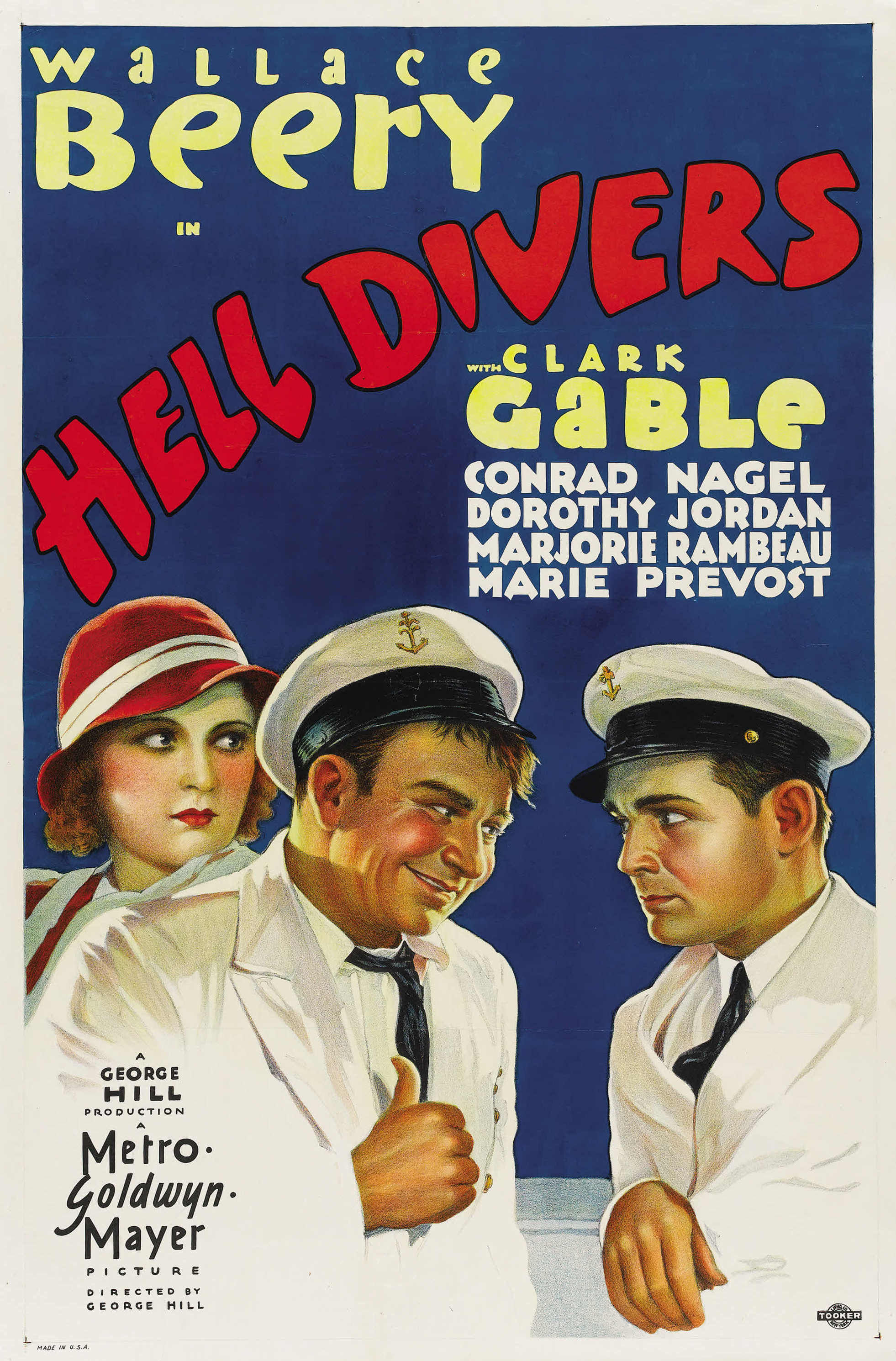
Hell Divers (1931)

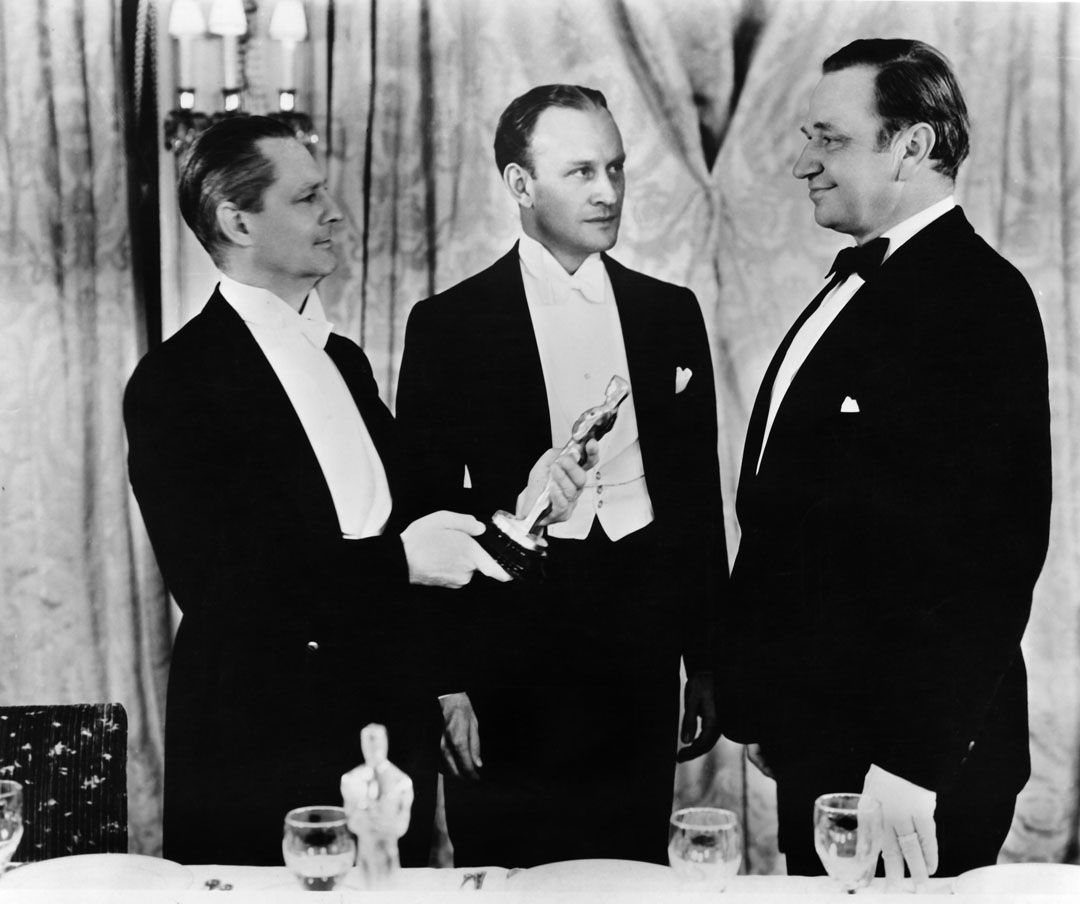
Lionel Barrymore presents Beery with Oscar (1931)

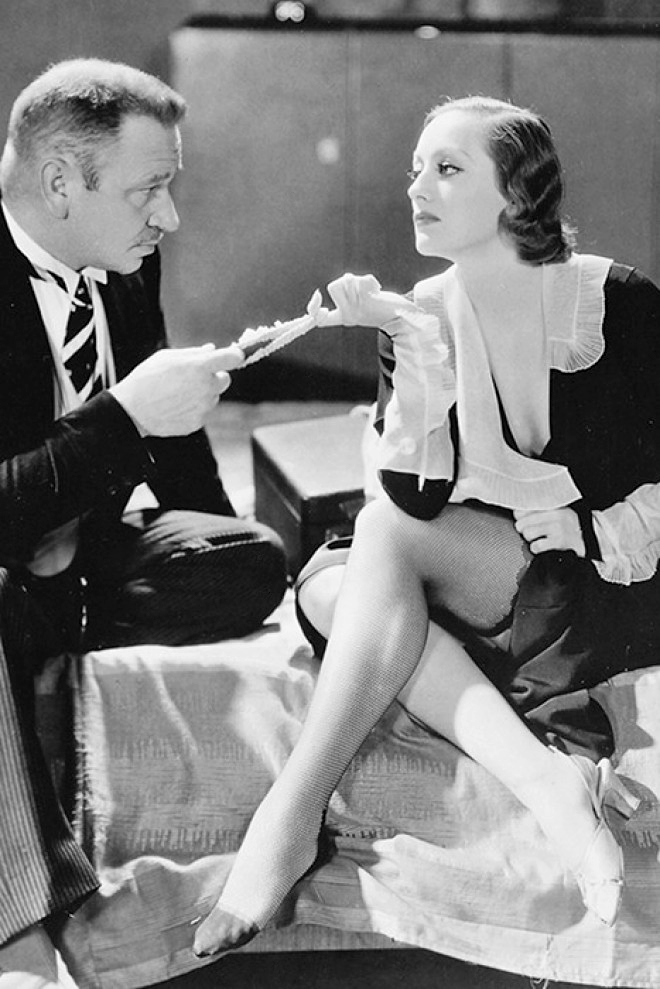
Grand Hotel (1932) with Joan Crawford

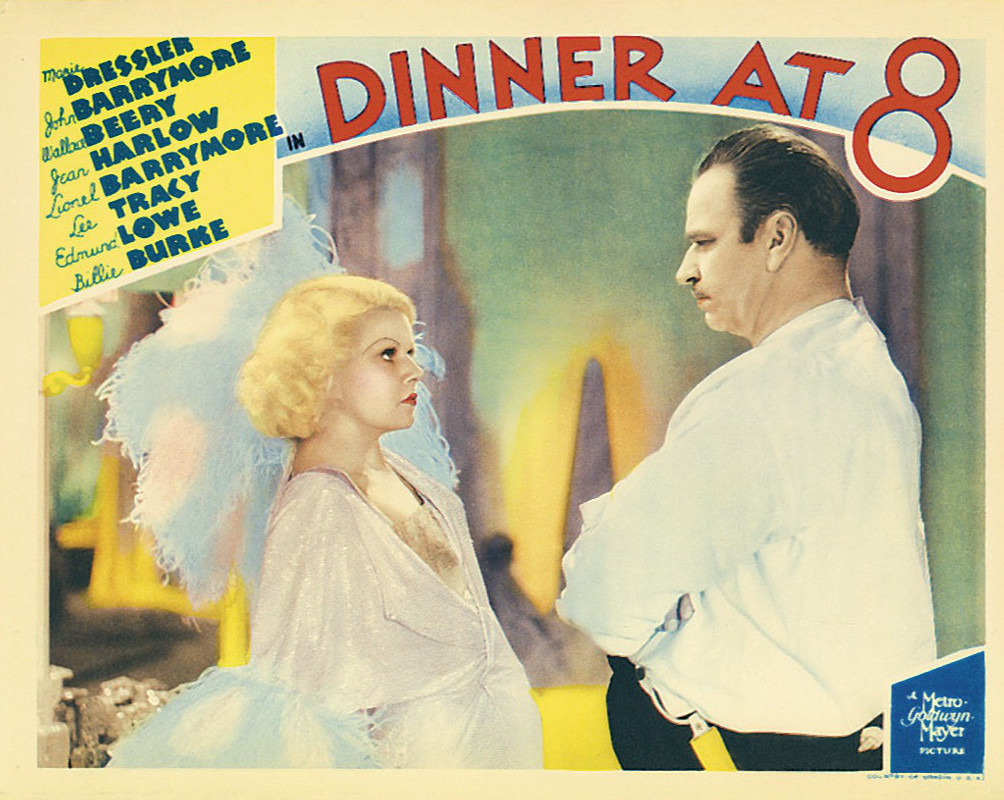
Dinner at Eight (1933) with Jean Harlow

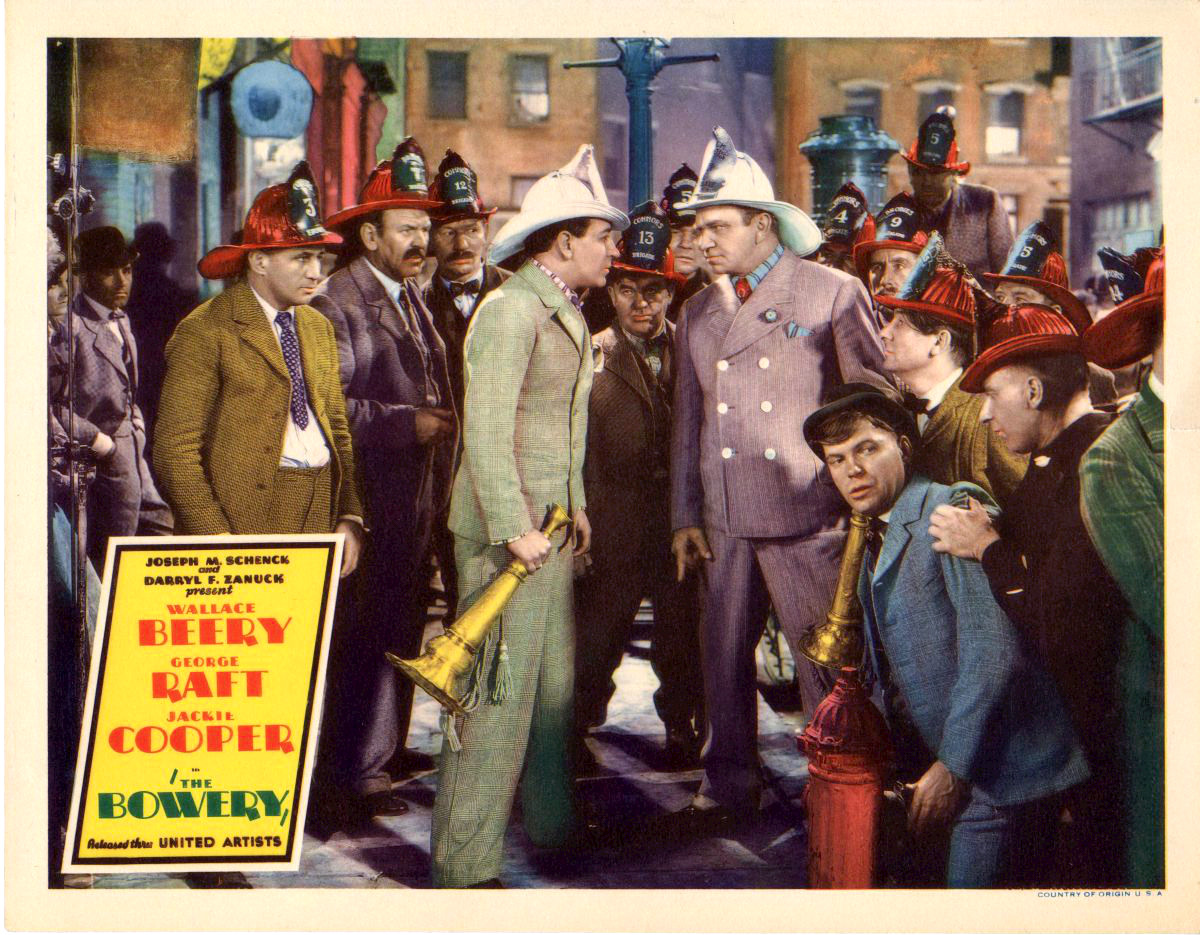
The Bowery (1933) with George Raft

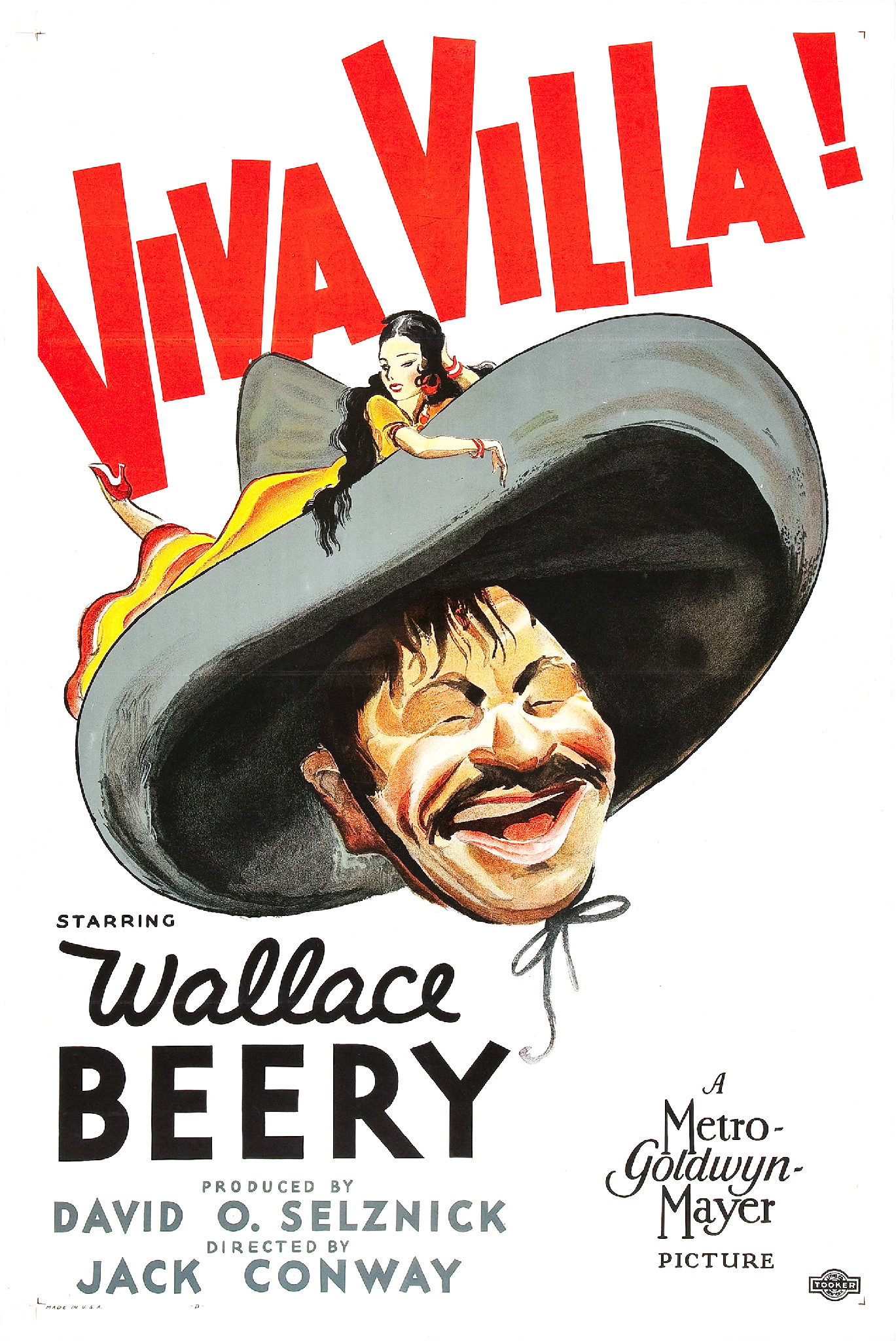
Viva Villa! (1934) with Fay Wray

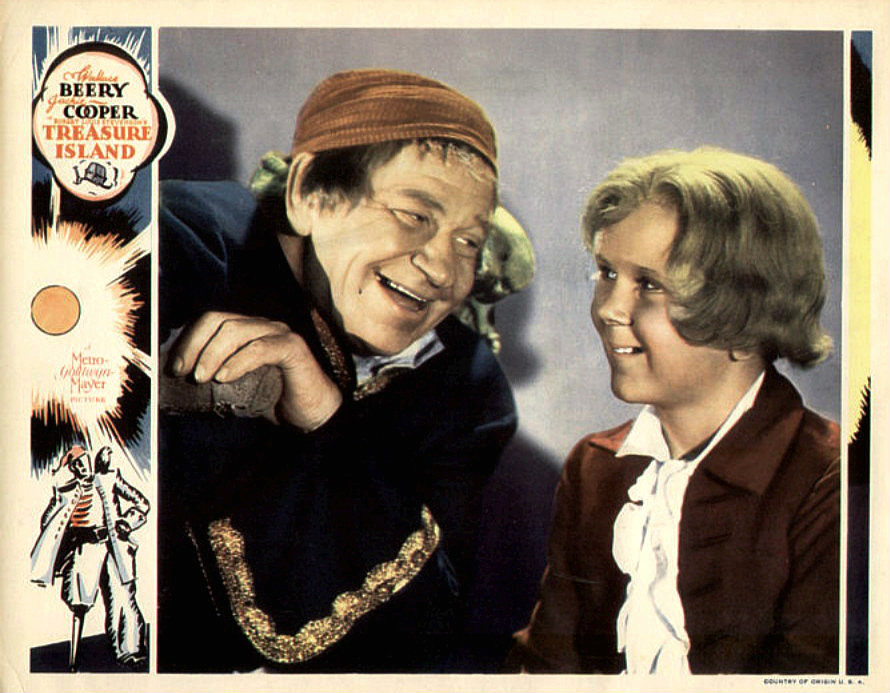
Treasure Island (1934) with Jackie Cooper

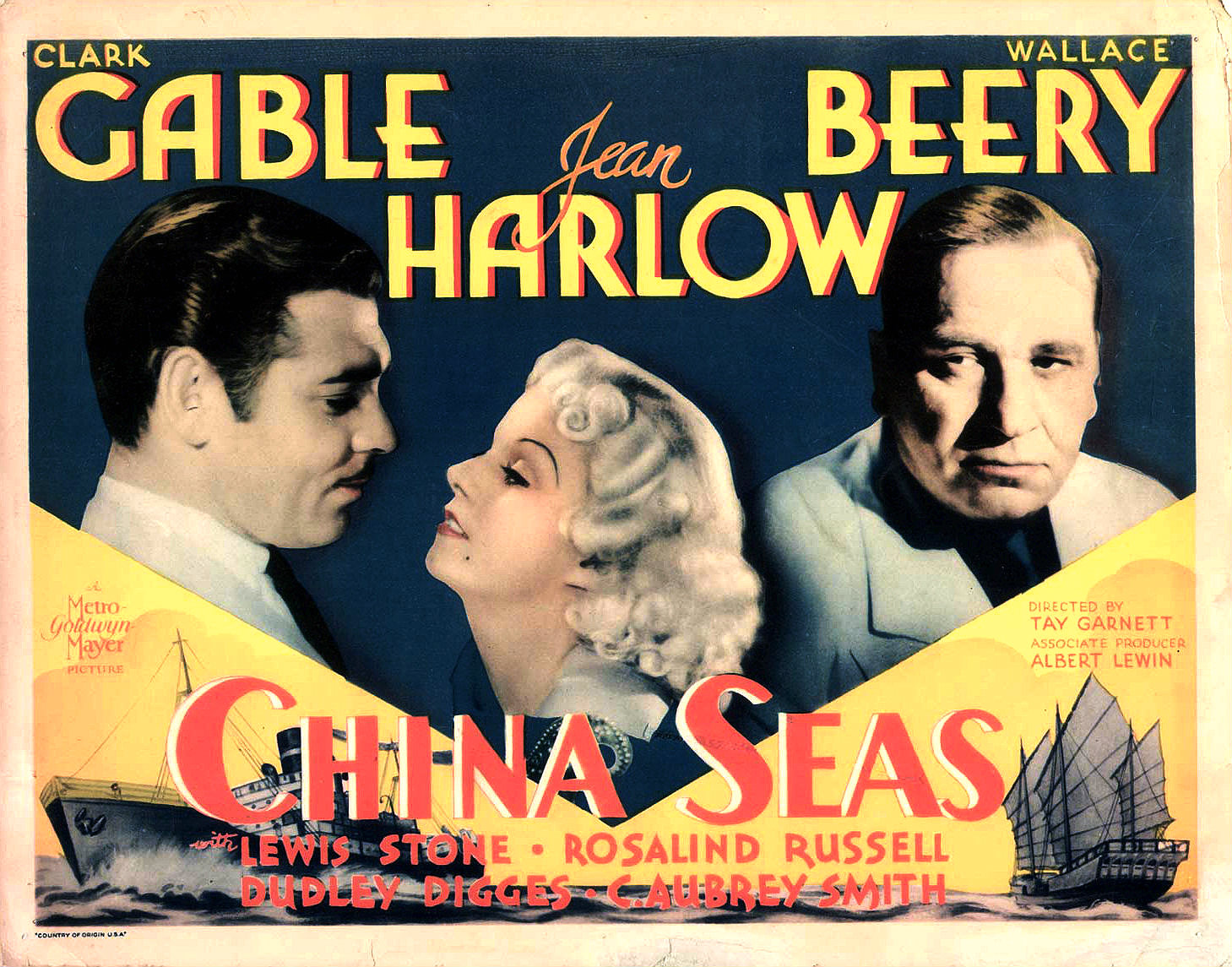
China Seas (1935)

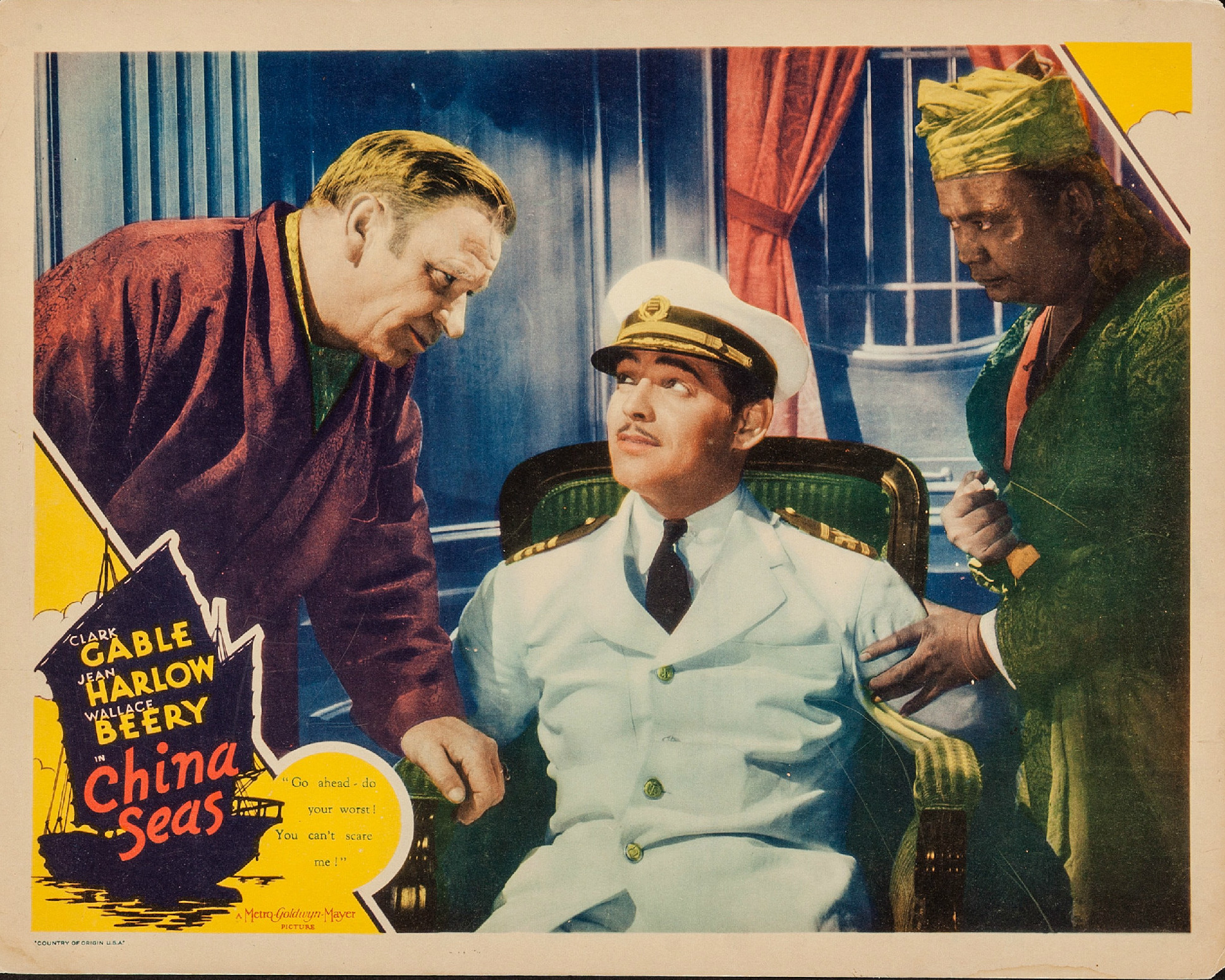
China Seas (1935) with Clark Gable

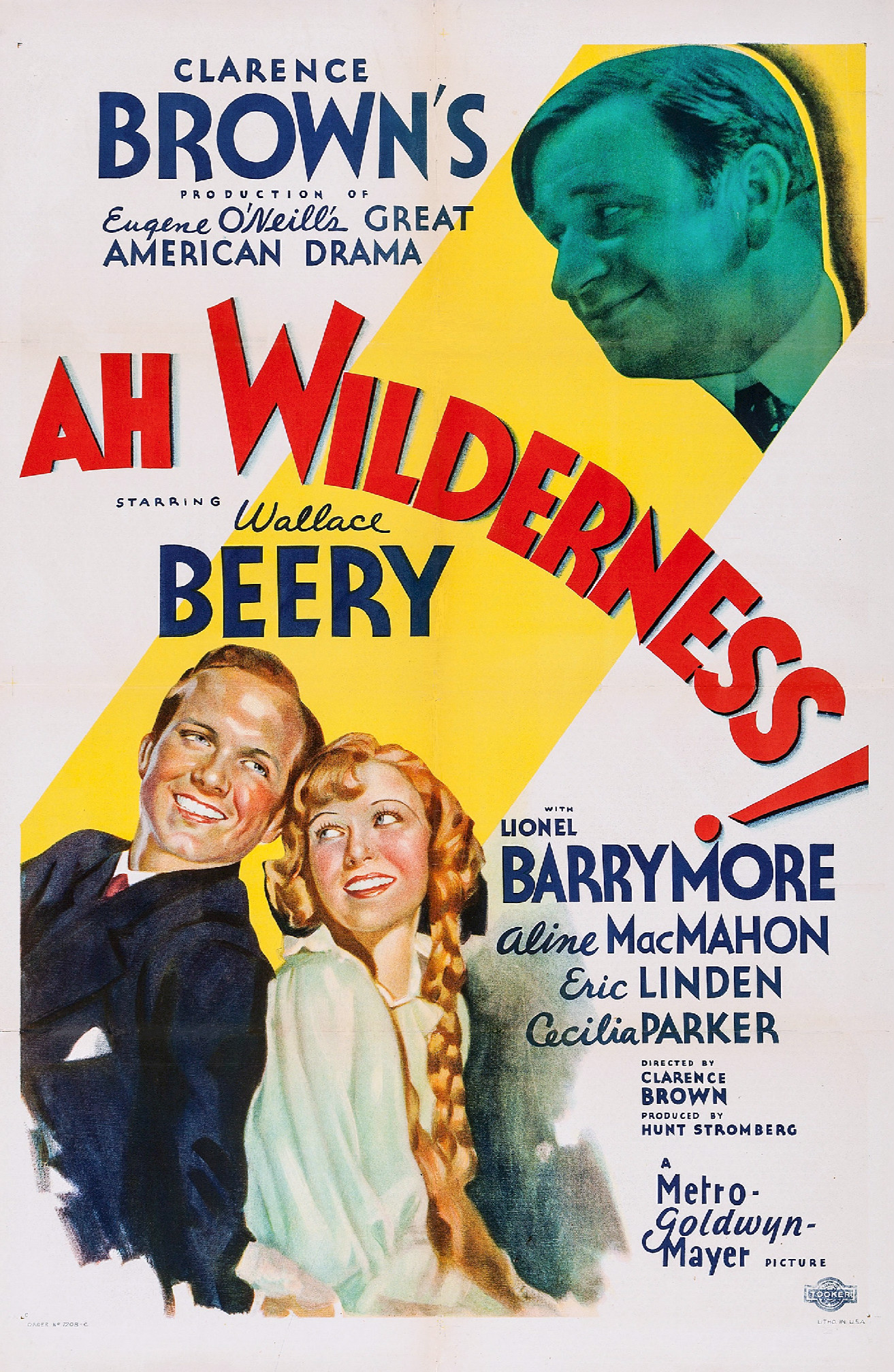
Ah Wilderness! (1935)

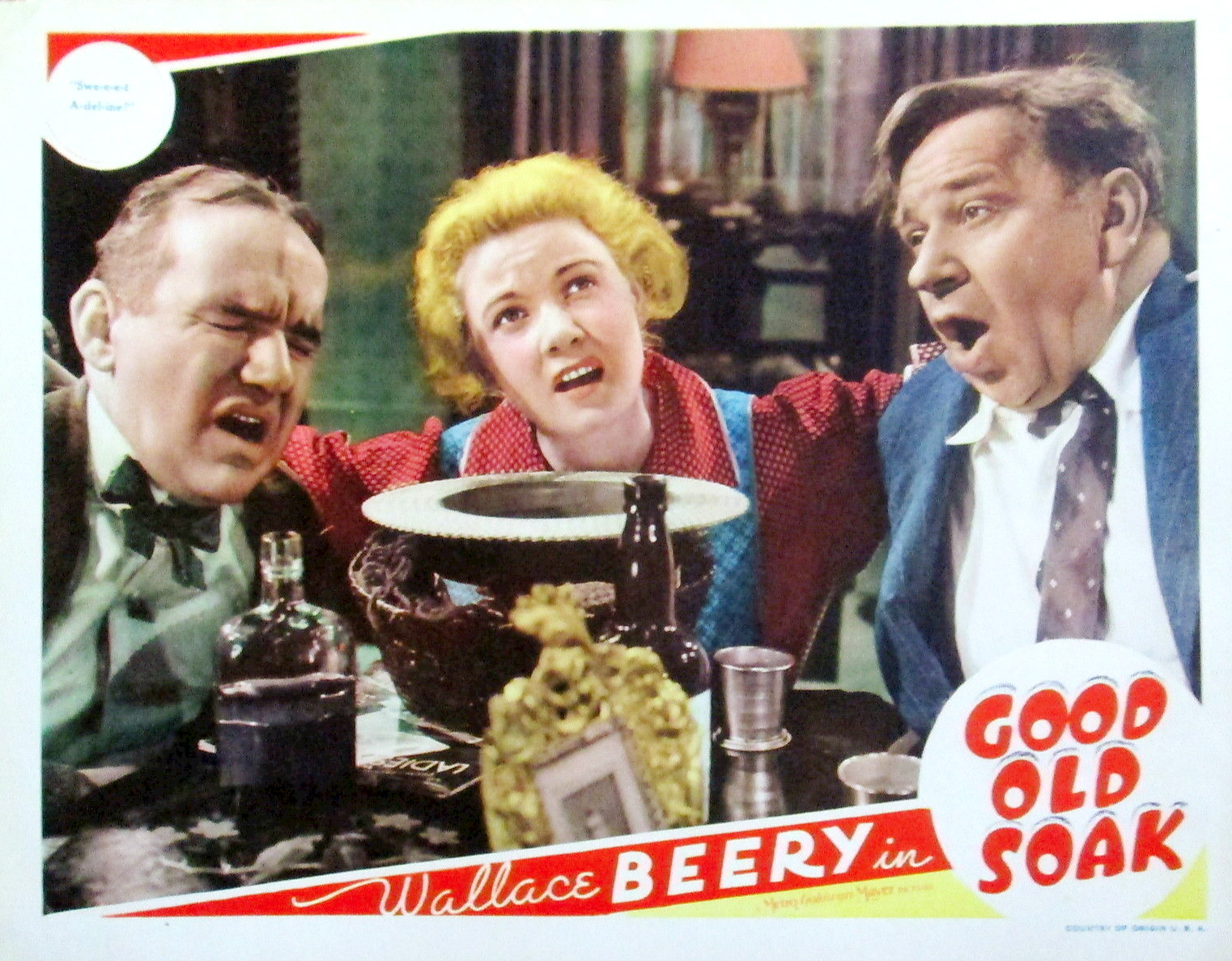
The Good Old Soak (1937) with Ted Healy

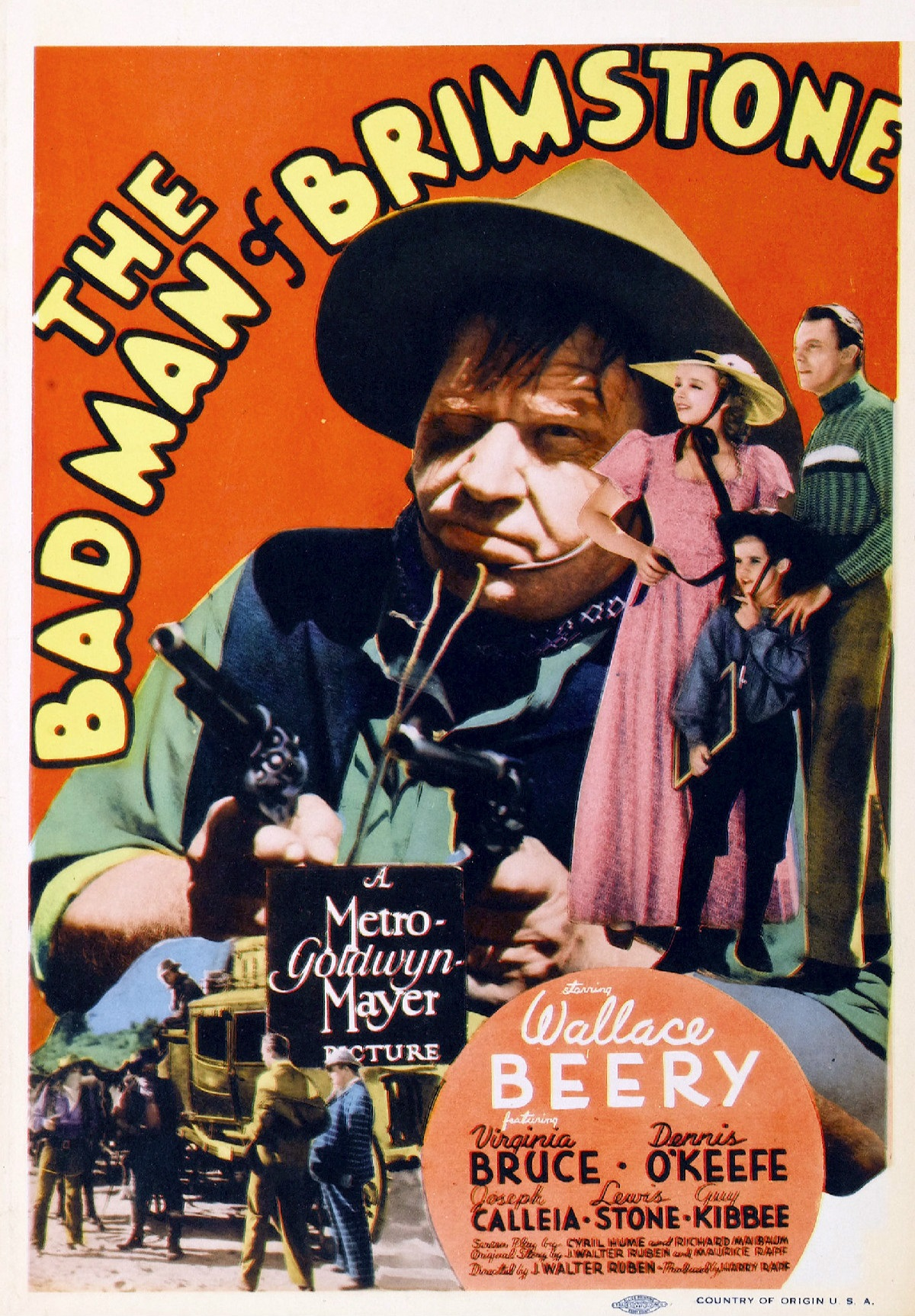
The Bad Man of Brimstone (1937)

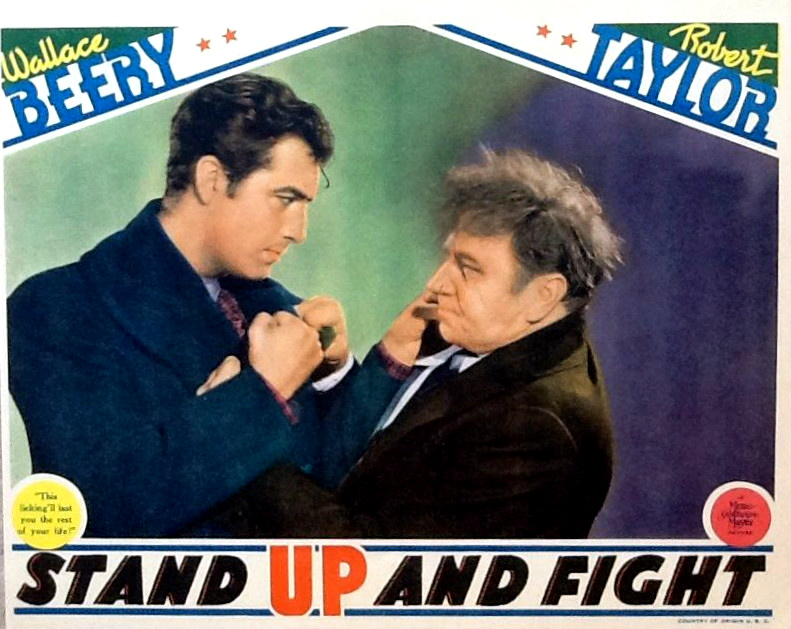
Stand Up and Fight (1939) with Robert Taylor

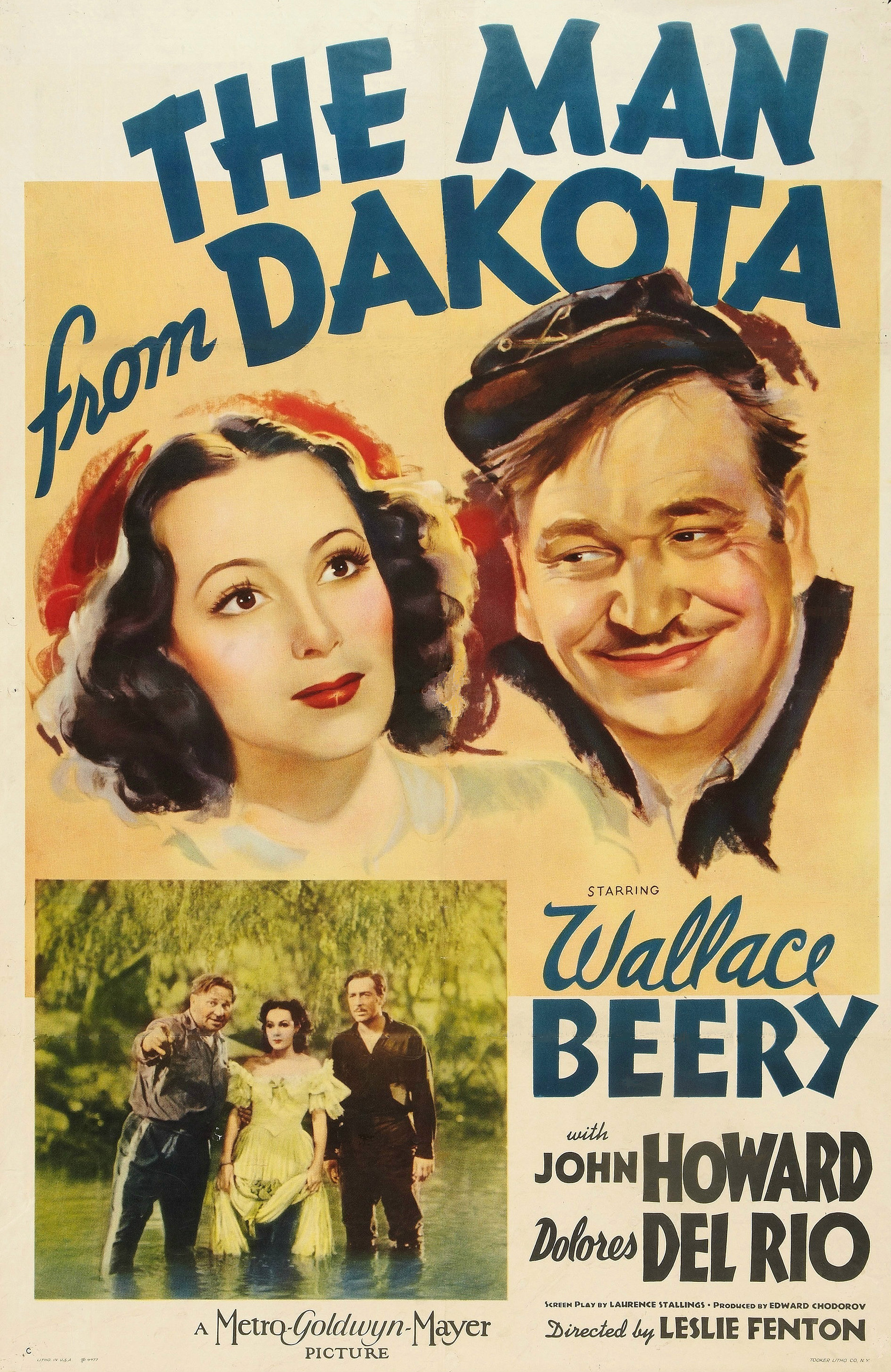
The Man from Dakota (1940)

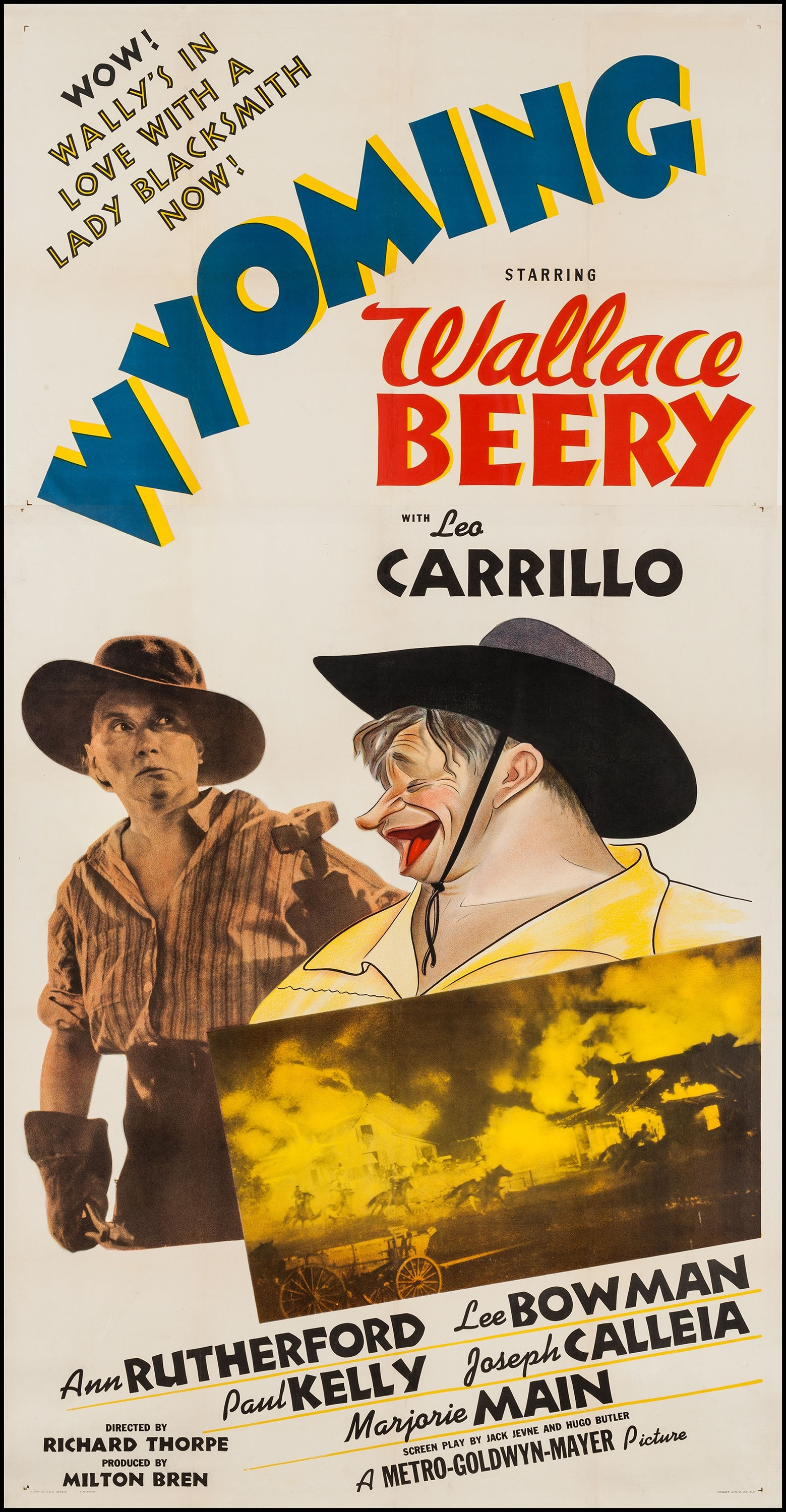
Wyoming (1940) with Marjorie Main

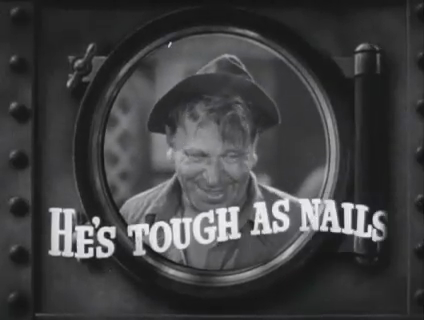
Barnacle Bill (1941)

== Awards and nominations ==
Academy Awards

Year	Award	Film	Result
1930	Best Actor	The Big House	Nominated
1932	Best Actor	The Champ	Won

Venice Film Festival

Year	Award	Film	Result
1934	Volpi Cup for Best Actor	Viva Villa!	Won

== See also ==
- List of actors with Academy Award nominations
