= Marry Me (1925 film) =

1925 film by James Cruze

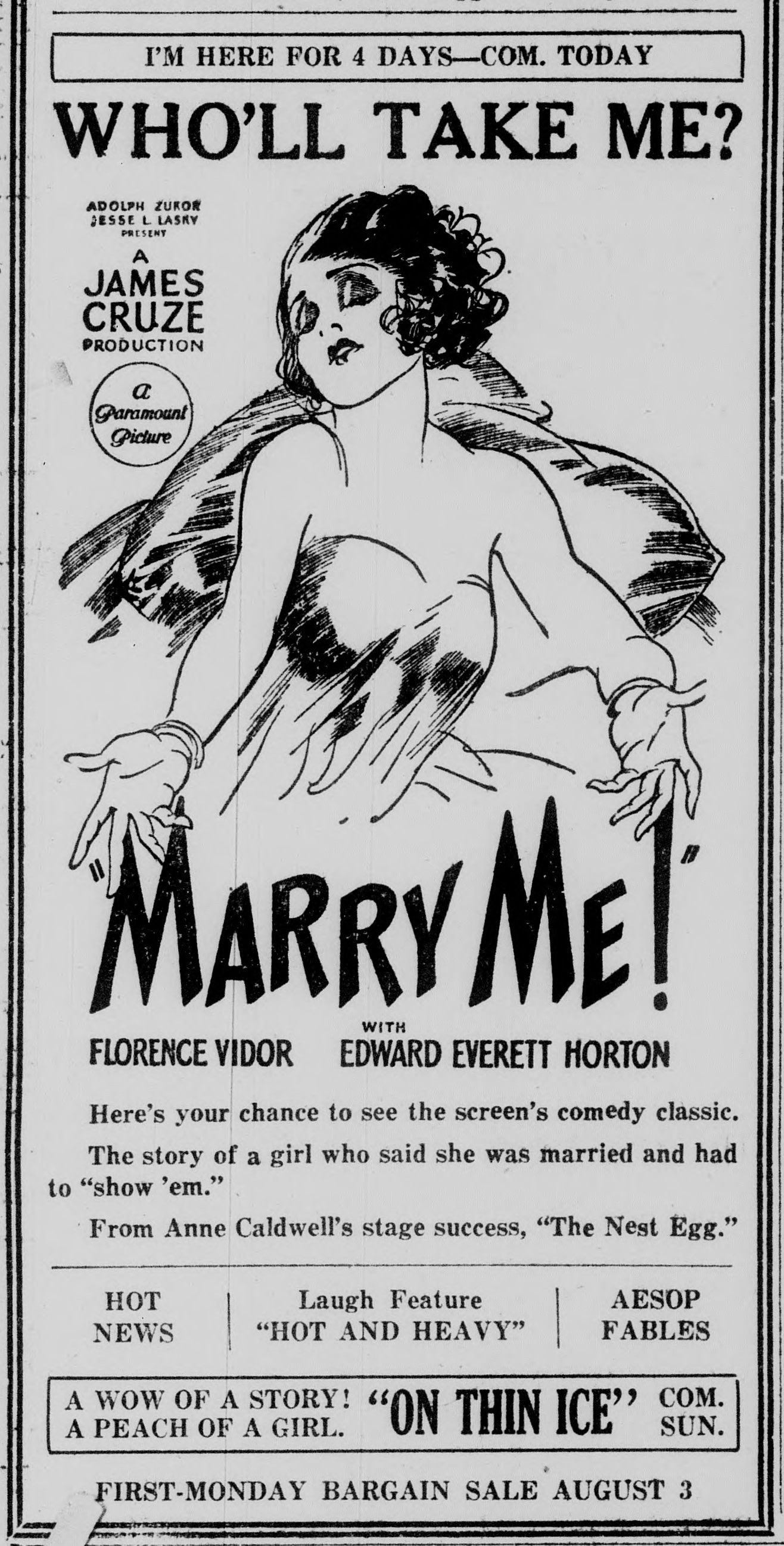
- Contemporary advertisement
- Directed by: James Cruze
- Screenplay by: Anne Caldwell; Anthony Coldeway; Walter Woods
- Produced by: James Cruze
- Starring: Florence Vidor; Edward Everett Horton; John Roche; Helen Jerome Eddy; Fanny Midgley; Ed Brady
- Cinematography: Karl Brown
- Production company: Famous Players–Lasky Corporation
- Distributed by: Paramount Pictures
- Release date: June 29, 1925
- Running time: 60 minutes
- Country: United States
- Language: Silent (English intertitles)

Marry Me is a 1925 American silent comedy film directed by James Cruze and written by Anne Caldwell, Anthony Coldeway, and Walter Woods. The film stars Florence Vidor, Edward Everett Horton, John Roche, Helen Jerome Eddy, Fanny Midgley, and Ed Brady. The film was released on June 29, 1925, by Paramount Pictures.

== Plot ==
As described in a film magazine review, in a small Maine town, John Smith and Hetty Gandy plan on getting married and, when he asks her to pick the date, she says "tomorrow." Upon reaching her room, she finds a telegram urging her to come home due to the illness of a relative. The only train leaves before morning, so she prepares to leave. After she leaves her room, she comes upon the hired man preparing a crate of eggs for market. She takes one and writes on it, "John Smith - June 10, 1920, Hetty Gandy, Eden Center." This is her answer to John for the day of their marriage. The hired man returns, finds one egg missing, and takes it from the hired girl. He puts it back in the crate and ships it away. Five years pass with no word from John. Then a telegram comes, saying, "I have found the egg you wrote on in 1918. I am coming on Tuesday. Arrange to accompany me home if possible. She prepares for her marriage. On Tuesday, she discovers upon the arrival of the sender of the telegram that it is not her John Smith, but a second one who is a dyspeptic pure drug crank. He wishes her to testify for him in a trial regarding storage laws. The young woman reaches the city with Smith to find that, in order to keep up the deception, they must register at the hotel as "John and wife." They sit up all night, believing that the complications that have begun to arise will clear away in the morning. However, on the witness stand, she admits that she is single, and then determines to hasten back to Eden Center. At the close of the trial, this John Smith proposes to her. When she believes that this is being done out of pity for her, he convinces her that he loves her, and all is well.

== Cast ==
- Florence Vidor as Hetty Gandy
- Edward Everett Horton as John Smith #2
- John Roche as John Smith #1
- Helen Jerome Eddy as Sarah Hume
- Fanny Midgley as Granny
- Ed Brady as Norman Frisbie
- Z. Wall Covington as Jenkins
- Anne Schaefer as Mrs. Hume
- Erwin Connelly as Jackson

== Preservation ==
In February of 2021, Marry Me was cited by the National Film Preservation Board on their Lost U.S. Silent Feature Films list and is therefore presumed lost.
