= One Glorious Day =

1922 film by James Cruze

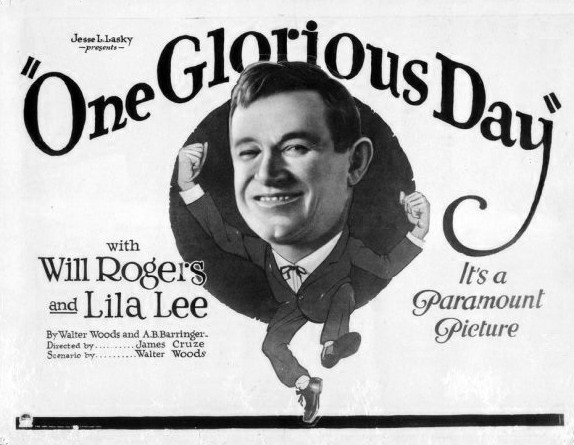
- Lobby card
- Directed by: James Cruze
- Screenplay by: Barry Barringer; Walter Woods
- Produced by: Jesse L. Lasky
- Starring: Will Rogers; Lila Lee; Alan Hale, Sr. Johnny Fox; George Nichols; Emily Rait
- Cinematography: Karl Brown
- Production company: Famous Players–Lasky Corporation
- Distributed by: Paramount Pictures
- Release date: January 29, 1922
- Running time: 50 minutes
- Country: United States
- Language: Silent (English intertitles)

One Glorious Day is a 1922 American silent fantasy comedy film directed by James Cruze and written by Barry Barringer and Walter Woods. The film stars Will Rogers, Lila Lee, Alan Hale, Sr., Johnny Fox, George Nichols, and Emily Rait. It was released on January 29, 1922, by Paramount Pictures. Working titles included Ek, A Fighting Soul and Souls Before Birth. Forrest J. Ackerman, the publisher of Famous Monsters of Filmland magazine, credited this film as being the one that "created his lifelong interest in science fiction and horror".

== Plot ==
A disembodied spirit entity with a strange appearance and bulging eyes named "Ek" takes over the body of a meek psychical researcher, Professor Ezra Botts, during an out-of-body experiment and proceeds to live it up while the researcher watches from limbo and tries to get back into his physical body and resume his life. Botts waits until the spirit collapses from exhaustion, then takes the opportunity to reinhabit his own body.

== Cast ==
- Will Rogers as Professor Ezra Botts
- Lila Lee as Molly McIntyre
- Alan Hale, Sr. as Ben Wadley
- Johnny Fox as 'Ek'
- George Nichols as Pat Curran
- Emily Rait as Mrs. McIntyre
- Clarence Burton as Bert Snead

== Production ==
The film was originally planned by Cruze, under the title The Melancholy Spirit, as a vehicle for the comic actor Roscoe "Fatty" Arbuckle, who contributed ideas to the project. However, during the initial planning stages, Arbuckle gave a party in San Francisco at which a young starlet died, and one of her friends told the authorities that Arbuckle had raped the woman. The police theorized that Arbuckle's extreme weight had ruptured the woman's bladder during the alleged assault. The subsequent scandal and Arbuckle's three trials for manslaughter forced him to drop out of the film, which was then re-titled and recast with Rogers in the Arbuckle role. (Arbuckle was later acquitted but his film career never recovered).

== Preservation ==
As none of copies were able to locate, the film is presumed lost.
