= The Garden of Weeds =

1924 film by James Cruze

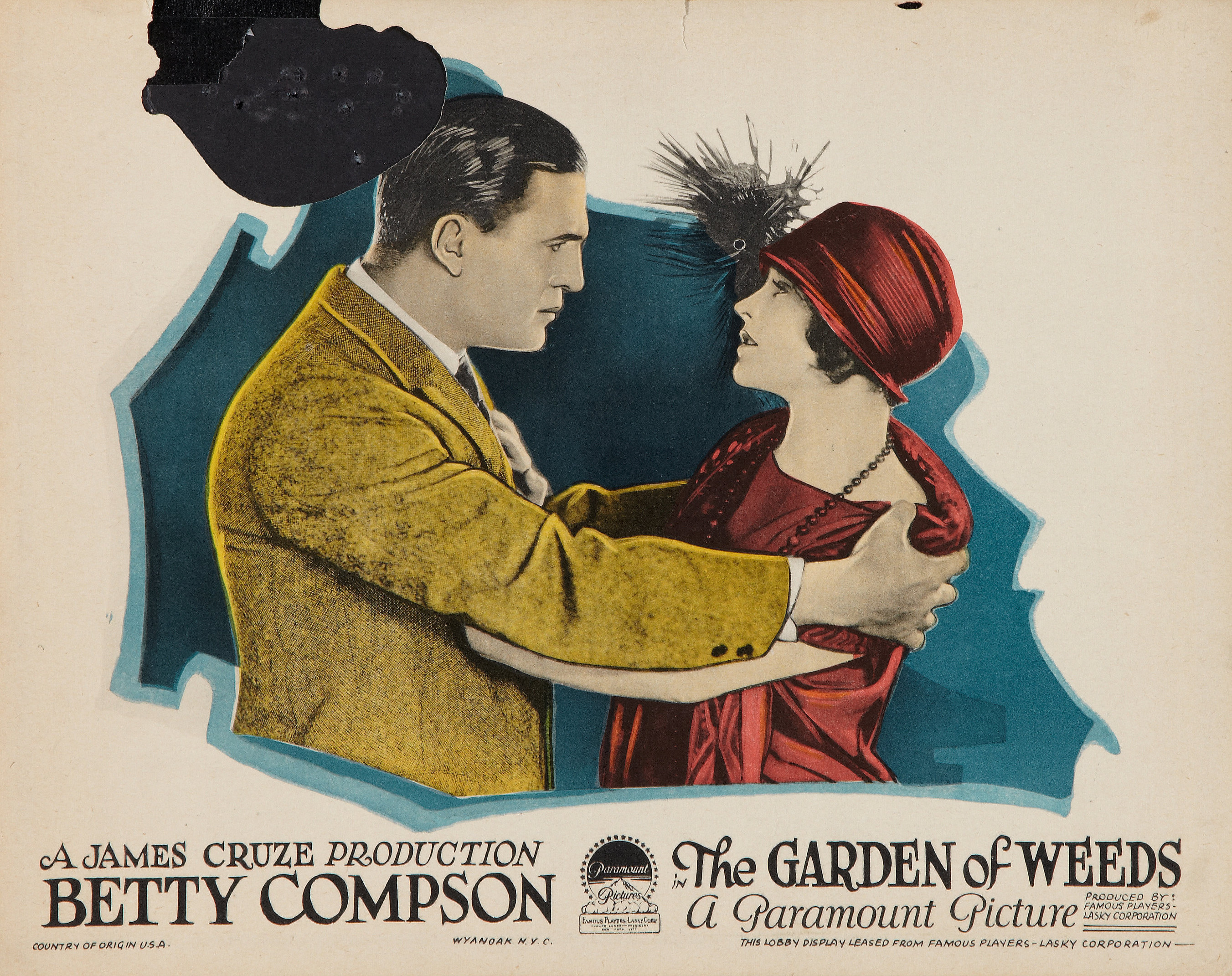
- Lobby card
- Directed by: James Cruze
- Written by: Anthony Coldeway; Walter Woods
- Based on: Garden of Weeds by Leon Gordon and Doris Marquette
- Produced by: Adolph Zukor; Jesse Lasky
- Starring: Betty Compson
- Cinematography: Karl Brown
- Distributed by: Paramount Pictures
- Release date: November 2, 1924
- Running time: 60 minutes
- Country: United States
- Language: Silent (English intertitles)

The Garden of Weeds is a 1924 American silent drama film directed by James Cruze and starring Betty Compson. It is based on the Broadway play Garden of Weeds by Leon Gordon and Doris Marquette. Famous Players–Lasky produced and Paramount Pictures distributed.

== Plot ==
As described in a review in a film magazine, of great wealth but lacking in the better traits, Phillip Flagg maintains an estate which he calls his "Garden of Weeds" where he entertains girls of the stage until he tires of them. Attracted to Dorothy Delbridge, he has her fired because she refuses to accept his attentions. She later accept his invitation and becomes the mistress of "Garden of Weeds." Meeting Douglas Crawford, another wealthy chap, she breaks with Flagg and marries him but has not the courage to reveal her past. Crawford engages Flagg's butler, who threatens to reveal the secret. Flagg comes to see Crawford and arranges to fleece him in a shady deal. He begins to taunt her with veiled jibes to get even. Dorothy, unable to stand it any longer, reveals the truth. Crawford says he has known it all the time and proceeds to thrash Flagg, who falls over the balcony railing and is killed.

== Cast ==
- Betty Compson as Dorothy Delbridge
- Rockliffe Fellowes as Phillip Flagg
- Warner Baxter as Douglas Crawford
- Charles Stanton Ogle as Henry Poulson
- King Zany as Jack Lane
- William Austin as Archie
- Lucille Thorndike as Old Maid
- William H. Turner as Theater Manager
- Toyo Fujita as Nick
- Lilyan Tashman as Hazel
- Al St. John as Nat Barlow
- Rosalind Byrne

== Preservation ==
The Garden of Weeds is currently presumed lost. In February of 2021, the film was cited by the National Film Preservation Board on their Lost U.S. Silent Feature Films list.
