= On to Reno =

1928 film directed by James Cruze

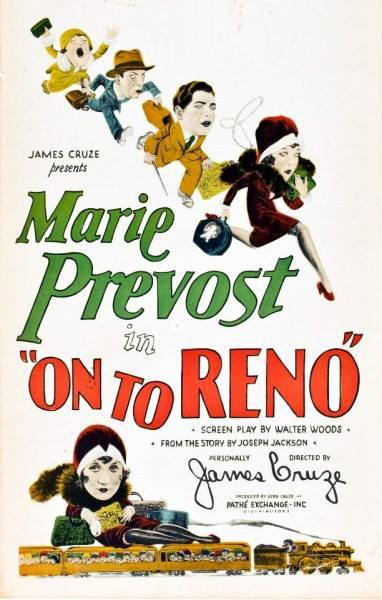
- Directed by: James Cruze
- Written by: Walter Woods; John Krafft (titles); Walter Woods (titles)
- Produced by: James Cruze
- Starring: Marie Prevost
- Cinematography: Ernest Miller
- Edited by: Mildred Johnston
- Distributed by: Pathé Exchange
- Release date: January 1, 1928
- Running time: 6 reels; 5,494 feet
- Country: United States
- Language: Silent with English intertitles

On to Reno is a 1928 American silent comedy film directed by James Cruze and starring Marie Prevost. It was produced by Cecil B. DeMille and released through Pathé Exchange.

== Cast ==
- Marie Prevost – Vera
- Cullen Landis – Bud
- Ethel Wales – Mrs. Holmes
- Ned Sparks – Herbert Holmes
- Jane Keckley – The Housekeeper

== Preservation status ==
This is a surviving film.
