= The Night Flyer (film) =

1928 film

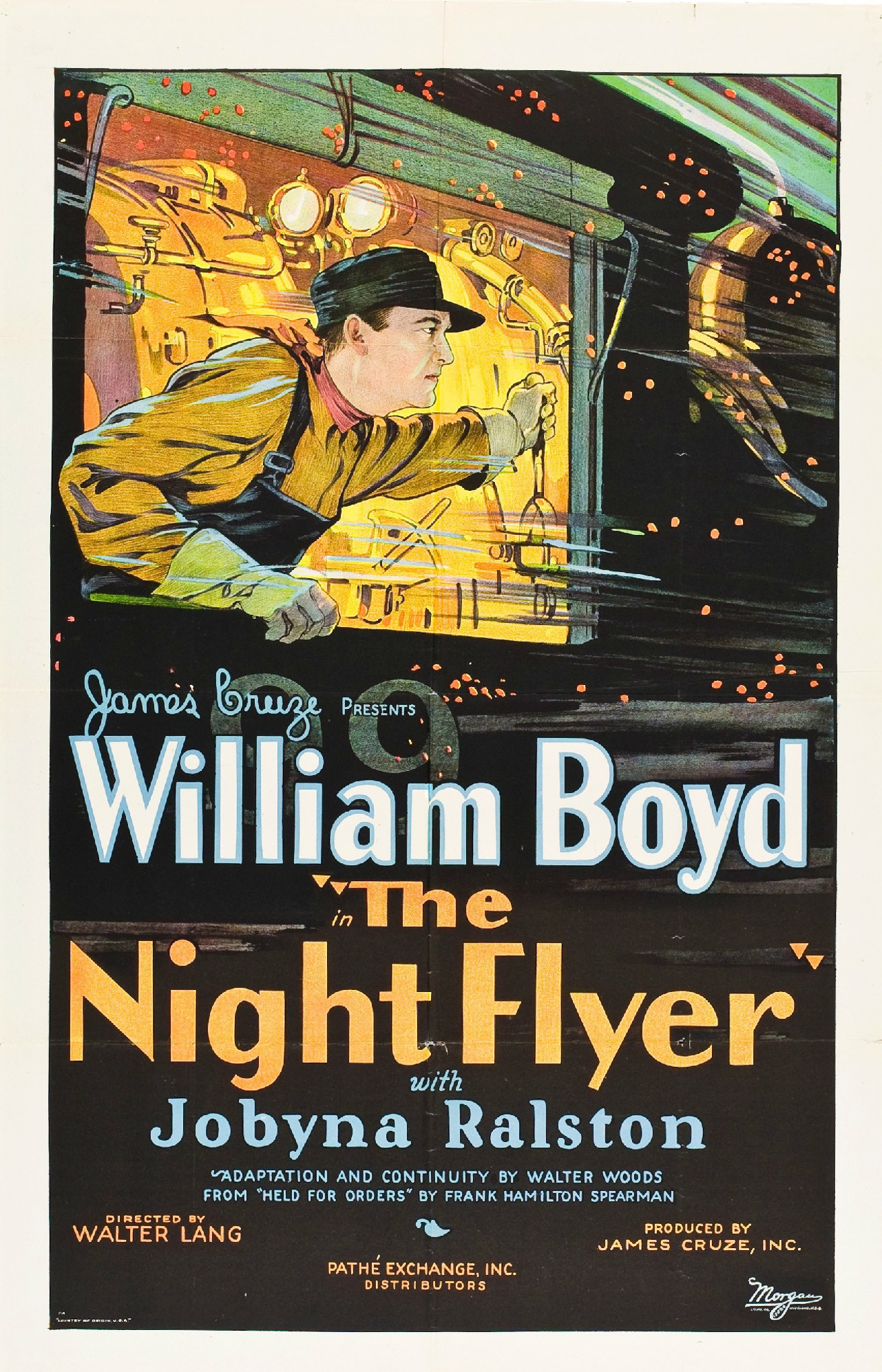
- Lobby poster
- Directed by: Walter Lang
- Written by: Frank H. Spearman; Walter Woods
- Produced by: James Cruze
- Starring: William Boyd
- Cinematography: Ernest Miller
- Production company: James Cruze Productions
- Distributed by: Pathé Exchange
- Release date: February 5, 1928
- Running time: 70 minutes
- Country: United States
- Languages: Silent; English subtitles

The Night Flyer is a 1928 American silent drama film directed by Walter Lang. A print of the film exists in the film archive of the Library of Congress. Parts of the film were shot in Thistle, Utah.

== Cast ==
- William Boyd as Jimmy Bradley
- Jobyna Ralston as Kate Murphy
- Philo McCullough as Bat Mullins
- Anne Schaefer as Mrs. Murphy (as Ann Schaeffer)
- DeWitt Jennings as Bucks
- John Millerta as Tony
- Robert Dudley as Freddy
