= Is Matrimony a Failure? =

1922 film by James Cruze

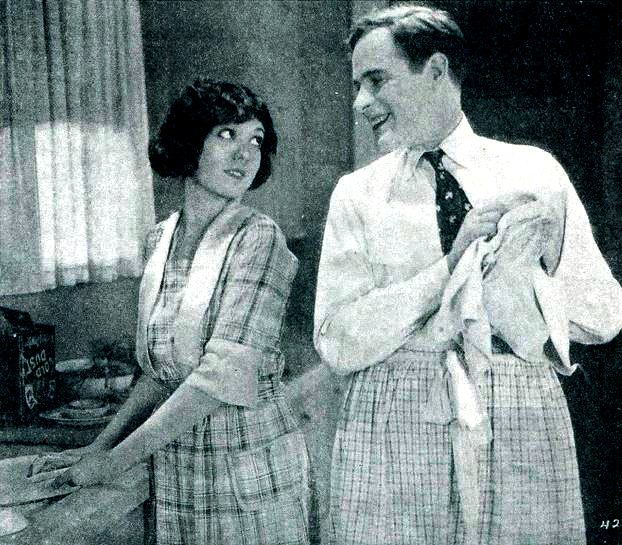
- Film still with Lila Lee and T. Roy Barnes
- Directed by: James Cruze
- Screenplay by: Walter Woods
- Produced by: Jesse L. Lasky
- Starring: T. Roy Barnes; Lila Lee; Lois Wilson; Walter Hiers; ZaSu Pitts; Arthur Hoyt; Lillian Leighton
- Cinematography: Karl Brown
- Production company: Famous Players–Lasky Corporation
- Distributed by: Paramount Pictures
- Release date: April 16, 1922
- Running time: 60 minutes
- Country: United States
- Language: Silent (English intertitles)

Is Matrimony a Failure? is a 1922 American silent comedy film directed by James Cruze and written by Walter Woods based upon a play of the same name by Leo Ditrichstein, which itself was an adaptation of the German play Die Tür ins Freie by Oscar Blumenthal and Gustav Kadelburg. The film stars T. Roy Barnes, Lila Lee, Lois Wilson, Walter Hiers, ZaSu Pitts, Arthur Hoyt, and Lillian Leighton. The film was released on April 16, 1922, by Paramount Pictures.

== Cast ==
- T. Roy Barnes as Arthur Haviland
- Lila Lee as Margaret Saxby
- Lois Wilson as Mabel Hoyt
- Walter Hiers as Jack Hoyt
- ZaSu Pitts as Mrs. Wilbur
- Arthur Hoyt as Mr. Wilbur
- Lillian Leighton as Martha Saxby
- Tully Marshall as Amos Saxby
- Adolphe Menjou as Dudley King
- Sylvia Ashton as Mrs. Pearson
- Charles Stanton Ogle as Pop Skinner
- Ethel Wales as Mrs. Skinner
- Sidney Bracey as Bank President
- William Gonder as Policeman
- Lottie Williams as Maid
- Dan Mason as Silas Spencer
- William H. Brown as Chef
- Robert Brower as Marriage License Clerk

== Preservation ==
In February of 2021, Is Matrimony a Failure? was cited by the National Film Preservation Board on their Lost U.S. Silent Feature Films list and is therefore presumed lost.
