= The City That Never Sleeps (film) =

1924 film by James Cruze

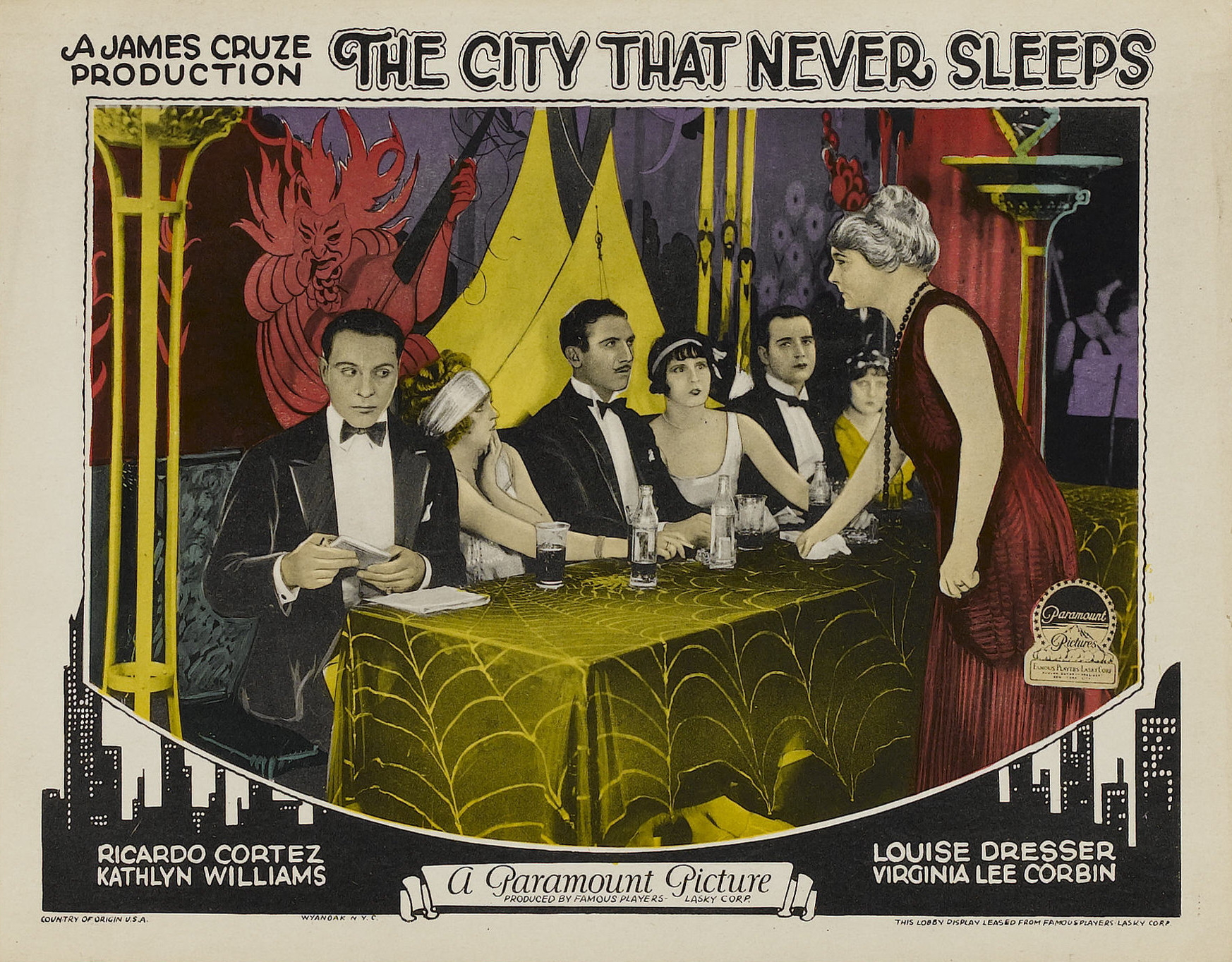
- Lobby card
- Directed by: James Cruze
- Written by: Walter Woods; Anthony Coldeway
- Based on: short story Mother O'Day by Leroy Scott, McCall's Magazine July 1924
- Produced by: Adolph Zukor; Jesse Lasky
- Starring: Louise Dresser; Ricardo Cortez
- Cinematography: Karl Brown
- Distributed by: Paramount Pictures
- Release date: September 29, 1924
- Running time: 6 reels
- Country: United States
- Language: Silent (English intertitles)

The City That Never Sleeps is a 1924 American silent drama film directed by James Cruze.

== Cast ==
- Louise Dresser as Mother O'Day
- Ricardo Cortez as Mark Roth
- Kathlyn Williams as Mrs. Kendall
- Virginia Lee Corbin as Molly Kendall
- Pierre Gendron as Cliff Kelley
- Jim Farley as Mike (credited as James Farley)
- Ben Hendricks Jr. as Tim O'Day
- Vondell Darr as Baby Molly

== Preservation ==
With no prints of The City That Never Sleeps located in any film archives, it is a lost film.
