= Mannequin (1926 film) =

1926 film directed by James Cruze

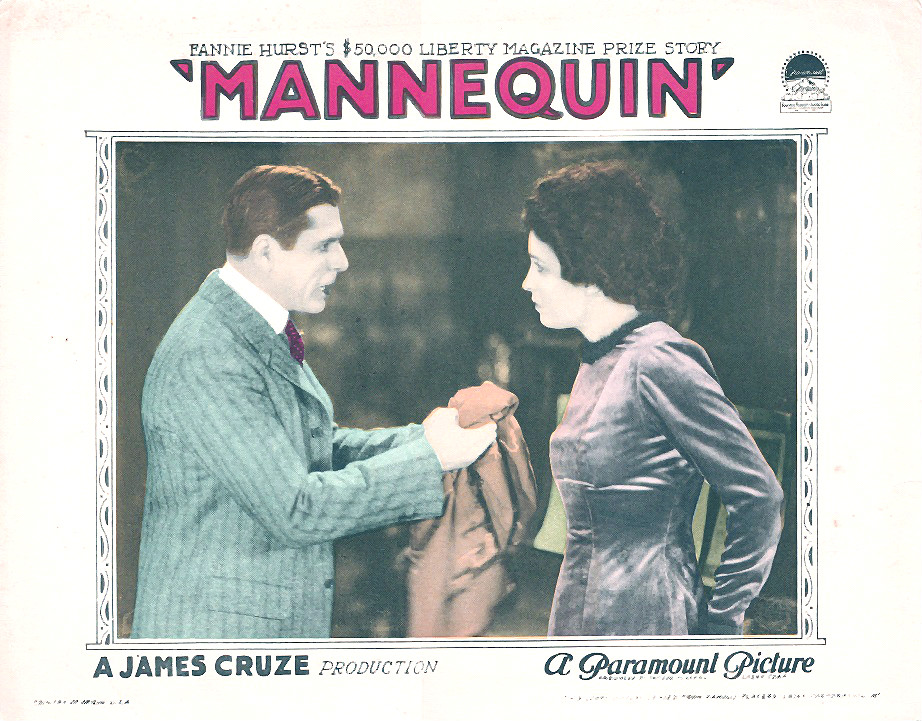
- Lobby card with a reference to the prize-winning story
- Directed by: James Cruze
- Written by: Walter Woods (adaptation); Frances Agnew (scenario)
- Based on: Mannequin; 1926 novel by Fannie Hurst
- Produced by: Adolph Zukor; Jesse Lasky; James Cruze
- Starring: Alice Joyce; Dolores Costello; Warner Baxter
- Cinematography: Karl Brown
- Distributed by: Paramount Pictures
- Release date: January 11, 1926
- Running time: 7 reels
- Country: United States
- Language: Silent (English intertitles)

Mannequin is a 1926 American silent romantic drama film produced by Famous Players–Lasky and distributed by Paramount Pictures. James Cruze directed and Alice Joyce, Warner Baxter, and Dolores Costello were the stars. The film is still extant.

== Plot ==
As described in a film magazine review, Selene Herrick's weakness for "things" she purchases at auctions brings about a quarrel with her husband John in 1907. He has hired a nurse, Annie Pogani, who runs off with the Herrick baby, Joan. John is under the impression that the child was taken away by Selene. The wife eventually returns and the loss of their child is disclosed. Raised in the East Side of New York City, after Annie's death Joan eventually obtains work as a cloak model and is eventually found by her parents.

== Cast ==
- Alice Joyce as Selene Herrick
- Warner Baxter as John Herrick
- Dolores Costello as Joan Herrick
- Zasu Pitts as Annie Pogani
- Walter Pidgeon as Martin Innesbrook
- Freeman Wood as Terry Allen
- Charlotte Bird as Toto (credited as Charlot Bird)
- Josephine Adair as Young Joan(uncredited)
- Bess Flowers as Mannequin (uncredited)
- Marcia Mae Jones as Little Girl (uncredited)

== Production ==
The novel that the film was based upon written by Fannie Hurst won a $50,000 contest conducted by Liberty in connection with Paramount Pictures, and was serialized by the magazine in 1926 when the film was released. Theater operators were encouraged to reference the magazine and prize when advertising the film.
