= Once a Gentleman =

1930 film directed by James Cruze

- Directed by: James Cruze
- Written by: Maude Fulton; Walter Woods; George F. Worts
- Produced by: James Cruze
- Starring: Edward Everett Horton; Lois Wilson; Francis X. Bushman
- Cinematography: Jackson Rose
- Production company: James Cruze Productions
- Distributed by: Sono Art-World Wide Pictures
- Release date: August 22, 1930
- Running time: 85 minutes
- Country: United States
- Language: English

Once a Gentleman is a 1930 American comedy film directed by James Cruze and starring Edward Everett Horton, Lois Wilson and Francis X. Bushman. A butler goes on vacation, where he is wrongly supposed to be a wealthy man.

== Cast ==
- Edward Everett Horton as Oliver
- Lois Wilson as Mrs. Mallin
- Francis X. Bushman as Bannister
- King Baggot as Van Warner
- Emerson Treacy as Junior
- George Fawcett as Colonel Breen
- Frederick Sullivan as Wadsworth
- Gertrude Short as Dolly
- Estelle Bradley as Gwen
- William J. Holmes as Ogelthrope
- Cyril Chadwick as Jarvis
- Evelyn Pierce as Natalie
- Drew Demorest as Timson
- William H. O'Brien as Reeves
- Charles Coleman as Wuggins

== Bibliography ==
- Pitts, Michael R. Poverty Row Studios, 1929–1940: An Illustrated History of 55 Independent Film Companies, with a Filmography for Each. McFarland & Company, 2005.
