= The Dictator (1922 film) =

1922 film directed by James Cruze

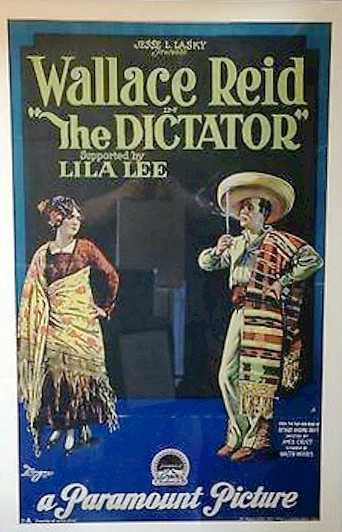
- Film poster
- Directed by: James Cruze
- Written by: Walter Woods (scenario)
- Based on: The Dictator by Richard Harding Davis (play)
- Produced by: Adolph Zukor; Jesse Lasky
- Cinematography: Karl Brown
- Distributed by: Paramount Pictures
- Release date: June 22, 1922
- Running time: 6 reels (5,221 feet)
- Country: United States
- Language: Silent (English intertitles)

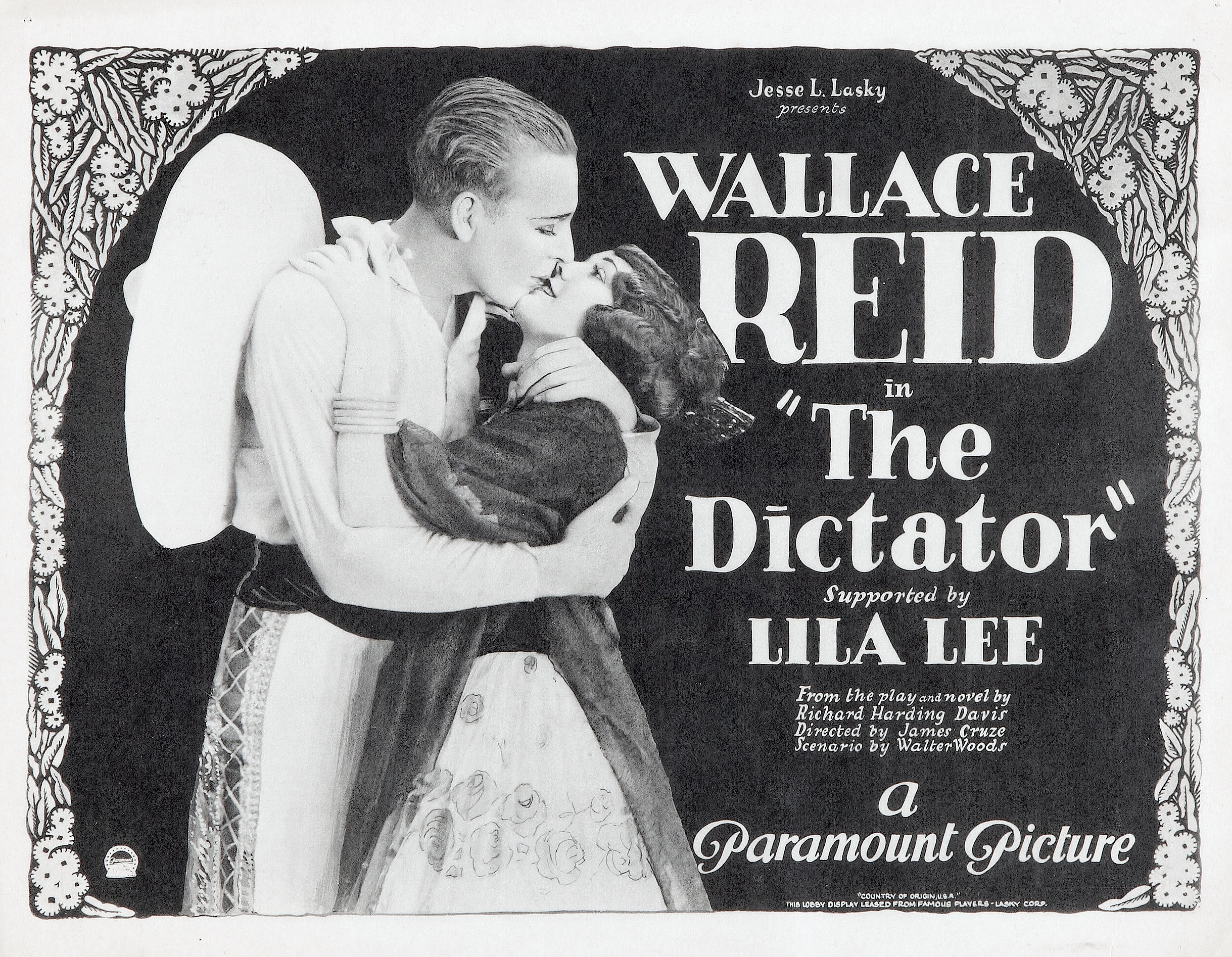
Lobby card poster.

The Dictator is a 1922 American silent comedy-drama film produced by Famous Players–Lasky and distributed through Paramount Pictures. James Cruze was the director and the star Wallace Reid.

The basic story had also been filmed in 1915 with John Barrymore who had played a supporting part in the 1904 Broadway starring production of comedian William Collier. Both this film and the 1915 version are now lost.

== Cast ==
- Wallace Reid as Brooke Travers
- Theodore Kosloff as Carlos Rivas
- Lila Lee as Juanita
- Kalla Pasha as General Campos
- Sidney Bracey as Henry Bolton
- Fred J. Butler as Sam Travers (credited as Fred Butler)
- Walter Long as Mike 'Bigg' Dooley
- Alan Hale as Sabos

== See also ==
- Wallace Reid filmography
