= The Fighting Coward (1924 film) =

1924 film by James Cruze

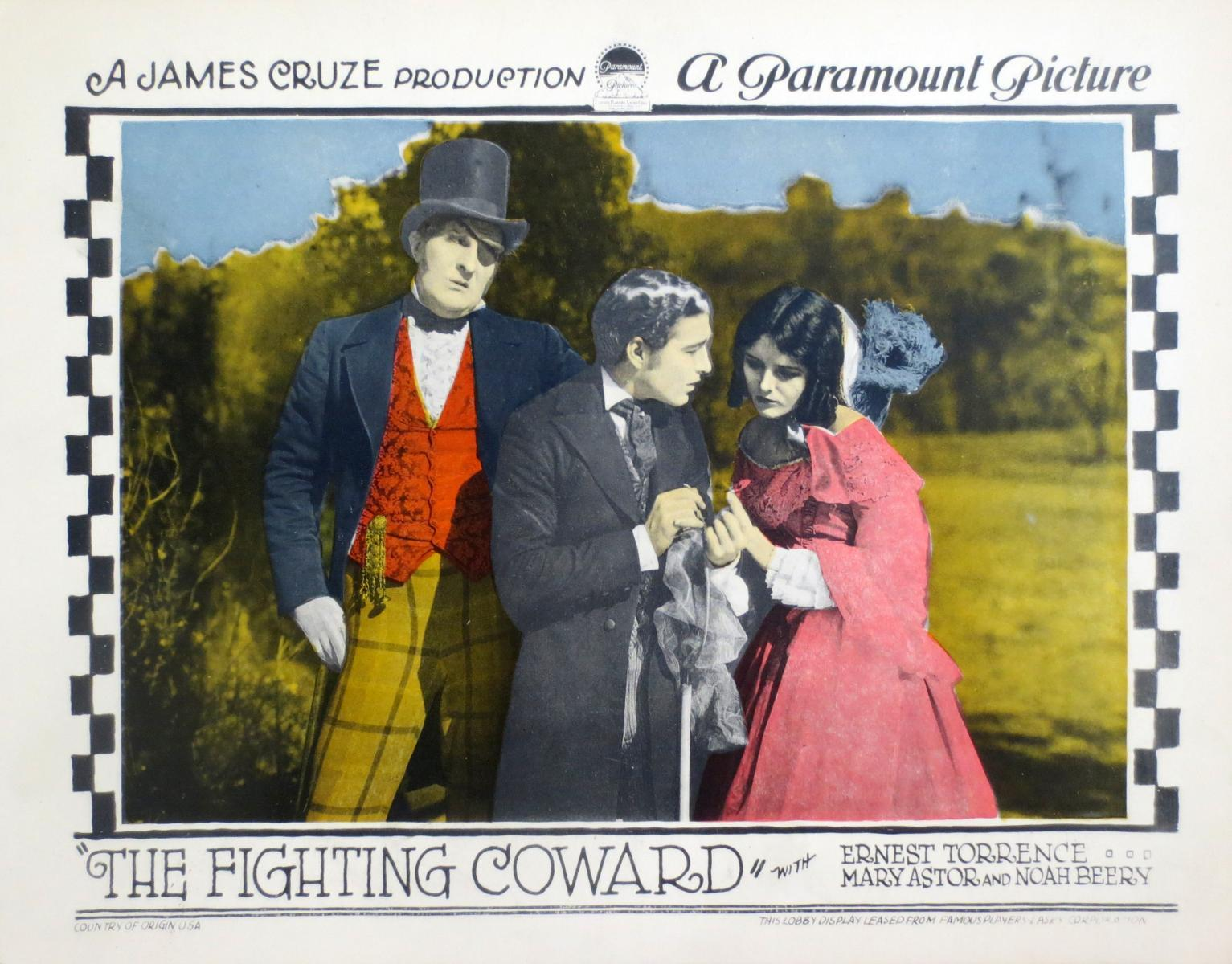
- Directed by: James Cruze
- Written by: Walter Woods (scenario)
- Based on: Magnolia by Booth Tarkington
- Produced by: Adolph Zukor; Jesse L. Lasky
- Starring: Ernest Torrence; Mary Astor; Noah Beery Sr. Cullen Landis
- Cinematography: Karl Brown
- Production company: Famous Players–Lasky
- Distributed by: Paramount Pictures
- Release date: March 30, 1924
- Running time: 7 reels (6,501 feet)
- Country: United States
- Language: Silent (English intertitles)

Full feature

The Fighting Coward is a 1924 American silent comedy film produced by Famous Players–Lasky, released by Paramount Pictures, and directed by James Cruze. The film stars Ernest Torrence, Mary Astor, Noah Beery Sr., Phyllis Haver, and Cullen Landis. The film is based on the play Magnolia by Booth Tarkington, from 1904.

== Plot ==
As described in a film magazine review, prior to the American Civil War, Tom Rumford, Southern born but reared by Philadelphia relatives, returns to Mississippi when 21 years old and becomes engaged to his cousin Elvira. Unused to the stern traditions of the Southern code of honor, he is driven from home in disgrace, stigmatized as being a coward, and loses his sweetheart's love when he refuses a challenge to fight a duel. Later, he meets General Orlando Jackson, a famous gunfighter. Jackson develops the young man into a dangerous shot and fighting man under the name Colonel Blake. With his honor cleared, he returns to his Mississippi home and visits his folks, who now bow down to him, and he weds Elvira's younger sister Lucy.

== Cast ==
- Ernest Torrence as General Orlando Jackson
- Mary Astor as Lucy
- Noah Beery Sr. as Captain Blackie
- Cullen Landis as Tom Rumford
- Phyllis Haver as Elvira
- G. Raymond Nye as Major Patterson
- Richard Neill as Joe Patterson (credited as Richard R. Neill)
- Carmen Phillips as Mexico
- Bruce Covington as General Rumford
- Helen Dunbar as Mrs. Rumford
- Frank Jonasson as Rumbo

== Preservation ==
Copies of The Fighting Coward survive in the Library of Congress, George Eastman Museum, and in the Gosfilmofond archive in Moscow.
