= The Dollar-a-Year Man =

1921 film directed by James Cruze

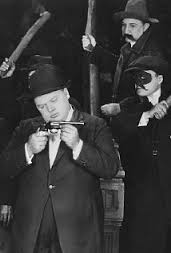
- Film still
- Directed by: James Cruze
- Written by: Walter Woods (original story & scenario)
- Produced by: Adolph Zukor; Jesse Lasky
- Starring: Fatty Arbuckle
- Cinematography: Karl Brown
- Distributed by: Paramount Pictures
- Release date: April 3, 1921
- Running time: 5 reels; 4,606 feet
- Country: United States
- Language: Silent (English intertitles)

The Dollar-a-Year Man is a 1921 American comedy film starring Fatty Arbuckle.

== Plot ==
Based upon a summary in a film publication, Franklin Pinney is a member of the Yacht Club which is hosting a Prince at a dinner. Fearing that Franklin, who is not a blue-blooded member, will commit some indiscretion, the members plan to have Kate Connelly, the club detective, lure him to a haunted house until after the ceremony. Tipson Blair has plans to kidnap the Prince and keep him prisoner at the haunted house. Kate gets Franklin to the haunted house, but a fight breaks out with the gang that is waiting for the Prince. Meanwhile, the Prince is playing hooky from the dinner and is out driving around with Peggy Bruce, whom Franklin loves. Out of curiosity, they stop by the haunted house in time for the fight between Franklin and the gang. Members of the royal party arrive to save the Prince, and Franklin as the hero of the fight wins Peggy.

== Cast ==
- Roscoe "Fatty" Arbuckle as Franklin Pinney
- Lila Lee as Peggy Bruce
- Winifred Greenwood as Kate Connelly
- Jean M. Dumont as Tipson Blair
- A. Edward Sutherland as The Prince (as Edward Sutherland)
- Edwin Stevens as Colonel Bruce
- Henry Johnson as General Oberano

== Preservation ==
In February of 2021, The Dollar-a-Year Man was cited by the National Film Preservation Board on their Lost U.S. Silent Feature Films list and is therefore presumed lost.

== See also ==
- List of American films of 1921
- Fatty Arbuckle filmography
