= Sutter's Gold =

1936 film by James Cruze

- Directed by: James Cruze
- Screenplay by: William Faulkner
- Produced by: Carl Laemmle
- Starring: Edward Arnold; Lee Tracy; Binnie Barnes
- Cinematography: George Robinson
- Edited by: Philip Cahn
- Music by: Franz Waxman
- Production company: Universal Pictures
- Distributed by: Universal Pictures
- Release date: March 1, 1936
- Running time: 94 minutes
- Country: United States
- Language: English
- Budget: $730,571

Sutter's Gold is a 1936 American Western film. It is a fictionalized version of the aftermath of the discovery of gold on Sutter's property, spurring the California Gold Rush of 1849. Edward Arnold plays John Sutter. The supporting cast includes Lee Tracy, Binnie Barnes, Katherine Alexander, Montagu Love, and Harry Carey as Kit Carson. The film was directed by James Cruze.

The film is based on the novel L'Or–la merveilleuse histoire du général Johann August Suter by Blaise Cendrars, and the play Der General und das Gold by Bruno Frank.

== Production and aftermath ==
Carl Laemmle, president of Universal Pictures, was a fan of action westerns and he wanted to make a big outdoor spectacle, along the lines of the well remembered silent epic The Covered Wagon (1923). Laemmle hired that film's director, James Cruze, for the new film Sutter's Gold. The studio assembled a "name" cast of popular character players including Edward Arnold, Lee Tracy, Harry Carey, and Binnie Barnes. Neither the studio nor the film had any big "star" names to attract moviegoers, and—dooming the project—Laemmle had given director Cruze carte blanche to make the film and Cruze spent money lavishly, as was his custom in the silent days. The expenditure was too lavish for the budget-conscious Universal, and the no-star spectacle failed disastrously. Sutter's Gold damaged James Cruze's standing irreparably and it ruined Universal. A consortium of investors ousted Carl Laemmle and took over the company (now known as "the NEW Universal"). The only real benefit Universal derived from Sutter's Gold was its value as stock footage; Cruze's carefully staged outdoor scenes were often edited into the studio's low-budget adventures, westerns, and serials.

== Cast ==
- Edward Arnold as John Sutter
- Lee Tracy as Pete Perkin
- Binnie Barnes as Countess Elizabeth Bartoffski
- Katharine Alexander as Anna Sutter
- Montagu Love as Capt. Kettleson
- Addison Richards as James Marshall
- John Miljan as Gen. Juan Bautista Alvarado
- Harry Carey as Kit Carson
- William Janney as John Sutter Jr.
- Nan Grey as Ann Eliza Sutter
- Robert Warwick as Gen. Alexander Rotscheff
- Morgan Wallace as General Fremont
- Allen Vincent as Juan Bautista Alvarado Jr.
- Mitchell Lewis as King Kamehameha
- Harry Cording as Seaman Lars (uncredited)
- George Irving as Dr. Billings (uncredited)

== See also ==
- Der Kaiser von Kalifornien (1936) film
