= The Pony Express (1925 film) =

1925 film directed by James Cruze

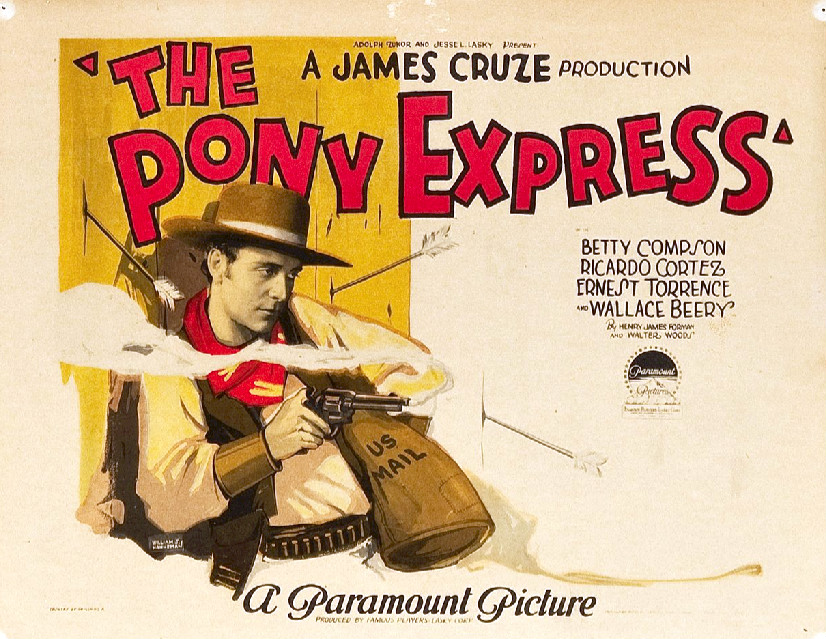
- Lobby card
- Directed by: James Cruze
- Written by: Walter Woods (scenario)
- Based on: The Pony Express by Henry James Forman and Walter Woods
- Produced by: Adolph Zukor; Jesse Lasky
- Starring: Betty Compson; Ricardo Cortez
- Cinematography: Karl Brown
- Music by: Hugo Riesenfeld
- Distributed by: Paramount Pictures
- Release date: September 20, 1925
- Running time: 10 film reel; 9,929 feet (110 minutes)
- Country: United States
- Language: Silent (English intertitles)

The Pony Express (1925)

The Pony Express is a 1925 American silent Western film produced by Famous Players–Lasky and distributed by Paramount Pictures. The film was directed by James Cruze and starred his wife, Betty Compson, along with Ricardo Cortez, Wallace Beery, and George Bancroft. The novel of the same name by Henry James Forman and Walter Woods was written concurrently with the film and they were released at the same time.

== Plot ==
As described in the studio pressbook for the film, Jack Weston is a gambler and gun fighter living in a state with legal slavery in 1860 America. Because of his opposition to slavery, Weston is marked for death by the "Knights of the Golden Circle", a secret society headed by Senator Glen, an avowed secessionist.

Weston escapes the Knights and rides to Julesburg in the Colorado Territory, where he becomes a Pony Express rider. His boss is Jack Slade, superintendent of the Overland Stage Company. The two men became bitter rivals over Molly Jones, a popular local girls.

Slade is also a Southern sympathizer. He and Glen have formulated a secret plot involving the 1860 presidential election. If Abraham Lincoln is elected president, they will send a fake dispatch by Pony Express to California announcing his defeat. Their hope is that the fake news will swing California to the Southern cause. Charlie Bent, the leader of a band of Lakota Indians, is also in league with Slade. However, Bent plans to take advantage of the excitement surrounding the election to raid Julesburg. Meanwhile, Weston has learned about Glen and Slade's plot and is determined to thwart it.

On the appointed day, news of Lincoln's election reaches Julesburg by the Pony Express rider. Weston takes that dispatch and starts riding west with it. Meeting the Pony Express rider coming east, Weston persuades him to trade runs and take the dispatch west while he takes the eastbound mail to Julesburg. Bent attacks Julesburg, but the town is saved by arrival of a regiment of US Cavalry. Knowing that Weston disrupted his scheme, Slade fires him. The news of Lincoln's election reaches California, solidifying its loyalty to the Union.

Weston and Jones, along with her father, move to Sacramento, California. Back in Julesburg, Slade is promoted by the Overland Stage Company for his supposed bravery in defending the town from Bent's attack. The film ends with the marriage of Jones and Weston. After the American Civil War begins, Weston joins the Union Army. He and other volunteers march down a street in Sacramento, singing, "We are coming Father Abraham, three hundred thousand strong!"

== Cast ==
- Betty Compson as Molly Jones
- Ricardo Cortez as Jack Weston
- Ernest Torrence as Ascension Jones
- Wallace Beery as Rhode Island Red
- George Bancroft as Jack Slade
- Frank Lackteen as Charlie Bent
- Johnny Fox as Billy Cody (credited as John Fox Jr.)
- William H. Turner as William Russell
- Al Hart as Senator Glen
- Charles Gerson as Sam Clemens
- Rose Tapley as Aunt
- Vondell Darr as Baby
- Ernie Adams as Henchman (uncredited)
- Hank Bell as Townsman (uncredited)
- Charles Brinley as Man in Top Hat (uncredited)
- William J. Dyer as Bartender (uncredited)
- Duke Kahanamoku as Indian Chief (uncredited)
- Jack Kenny as Minor Role (uncredited)
- Toby Wing as Child (uncredited)

== Preservation ==
Prints of The Pony Express are held by the George Eastman House, the UCLA Film & Television Archive, and the Pacific Film Archive. The film was re-released on DVD in 2012 and 2021.
