= Leap Year (1924 film) =

1921 film by Roscoe Arbuckle and James Cruze

- Directed by: Roscoe Arbuckle; James Cruze
- Written by: Sarah Y. Mason; Walter Woods
- Starring: Roscoe "Fatty" Arbuckle
- Cinematography: Karl Brown
- Distributed by: Paramount Pictures
- Release dates: April 27, 1924 (Finland); 1981 (USA)
- Running time: 60 minutes
- Country: United States
- Language: Silent (English intertitles)

Leap Year is an 1924 American silent comedy film directed by and starring Roscoe Arbuckle and James Cruze. Though produced in 1921, the film was not released in the United States due to Arbuckle's involvement in the Virginia Rappe death scandal; it received its first release in Finland in 1924. The film finally saw an American release of sorts in 1981. Prints are held by the UCLA Film & Television Archive and Library of Congress.

== Plot summary ==
Roscoe Arbuckle plays Stanley Piper, heir to his uncle's millions. He lives at Piper Hall. His valet is Mumford. Inside the house, Jeremiah Piper, Stanley's uncle, who is gouty, grouchy and a girl-hater, is being looked after by his nurse, Phyllis Brown. He decides to send Stanley on a fishing trip to keep him away from women as he falls in love with every woman he meets. The ‘fool nephew,’ stutters when he is excited and is relived only by drink (water). Nurse Brown is upset to hear this news. Stanley brings flowers for Nurse Brown only to be told by his uncle that she has been fired. He catches her as she is about to leave the house. She tells him what his uncle has said about Stanley falling in love with every woman he meets. Stanley is unable to state is case, his stutter making him momentarily speechless until Mumford gives him water when he tells her it is a base falsehood and he can prove it. If he can prove it, she decides, they can be together. While he is trying to prove his love for Nurse Brown, he inadvertently ends up engaged to three different women and must extricate himself from all three engagements by pretending to be seriously ill and suffering from fits. When this does not work, fate intervenes, and the three women find welcome distractions in the form of the other characters.

== Cast ==
- Roscoe "Fatty" Arbuckle as Stanley Piper
- Mary Thurman as Nurse Phyllis Brown
- Lucien Littlefield as Jeremiah Piper
- Clarence Geldart as Scott Travis
- Harriet Hammond as Loris Keene
- Allen Durnell as Tommy Blaine
- Gertrude Short as Molly Morris
- John McKinnon as Mumford, the valet
- Maude Wayne as Irene Rutherford
- Winifred Greenwood as Mrs. Travis
