= Hawthorne of the U.S.A. =

1919 film by James Cruze

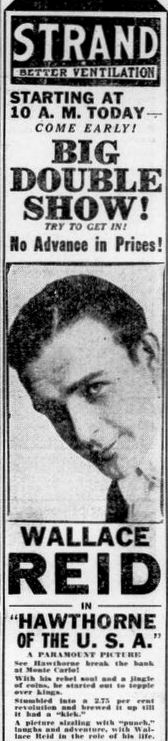
- Newspaper advertisement
- Directed by: James Cruze; Cullen Tate (assistant director)
- Written by: Walter Woods (scenario)
- Based on: Hawthorne of the U.S.A. by James B. Fagan
- Produced by: Adolph Zukor; Jesse L. Lasky
- Starring: Wallace Reid; Lila Lee
- Cinematography: Frank Urson; William Marshall; Charles Schoenbaum
- Production company: Famous Players–Lasky
- Distributed by: Paramount-Artcraft Picture
- Release date: November 30, 1919
- Running time: 57 minutes
- Country: United States
- Language: Silent (English intertitles)

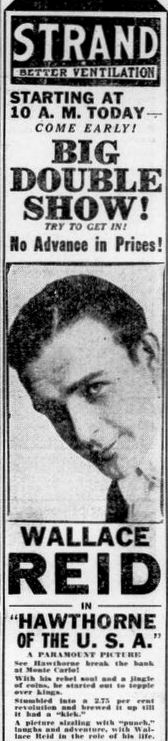

Hawthorne of the U.S.A. is a 1919 American silent comedy adventure film directed by James Cruze and starring Wallace Reid and Lila Lee. The film is based on the play of the same name by James B. Fagan. It had run on Broadway in 1912 with Douglas Fairbanks in the title role. The scenario for the film was written by Walter Woods. The film was produced by Famous Players–Lasky, and distributed by Famous Players under the Paramount-Artcraft Picture banner.

A print of Hawthorne of the U.S.A. is preserved at the Library of Congress.

== Plot ==
As described in a film magazine, Anthony Hawthorne, an American with modern ideas, stirs fashionable Europe when he breaks the bank at Monte Carlo. Prince Vladimir, a covetous member of the royal family of a small principality, makes an attempt to obtain the fund Hawthorne has on in order to purchase the army of Augustus III, whom he seeks to depose. Hawthorne joins the prince in his plot but changes his mind when he meets Princess Irma and learns that the prince plans to murder her father. Hawthorne works to foil the plot of the prince and ends up establishing a republican form of government and marrying Irma.

== Cast ==
- Wallace Reid as Anthony Hamilton Hawthorne
- Lila Lee as Princess Irma
- Harrison Ford as Rodney Blake
- Tully Marshall as Nitchi
- Charles Ogle as Colonel Radulski
- Guy Oliver as Count Henloe
- Edwin Stevens as Prince Vladimir
- Clarence Burton as Fredericks
- Theodore Roberts as Senator Ballard
- Ruth Renick as Kate Ballard
- Robert Brower as King Augustus III
- Frank Bonner as De Witz

== See also ==
- Wallace Reid filmography
