= Under the Big Top =

1938 film by Karl Brown

- Directed by: Karl Brown
- Written by: Karl Brown (screenplay); Llewellyn Hughes (story); Marion Orth (writer)
- Produced by: William T. Lackey (as William Lackey)
- Starring: See below
- Cinematography: Gilbert Warrenton
- Edited by: Russell F. Schoengarth
- Distributed by: Monogram Pictures
- Release date: August 31, 1938
- Running time: 64 minutes
- Country: United States
- Language: English

Under the Big Top is a 1938 American film directed by Karl Brown.

== Plot ==
A trapeze artist girl in a circus is persistently demanded by her aunt to be the best in the business. She falls in love with one of the men in her trapeze act, but her mother works to break up the romance. Then another trapeze artist falls in love with her and also works to break up the romance.

== Cast ==
- Marjorie Main as Sara Post
- Anne Nagel as Penny
- Jack La Rue as Ricardo Le Grande
- Grant Richards as Pablo Le Grande
- Fred 'Snowflake' Toones as Juba
- Betty Compson as Marie
- Herbert Rawlinson as Herman
- George Cleveland as Joe
- Rolfe Sedan as Pierre
- Charlene Wyatt as Penny - as a child
- Harry Harvey as McCarthy
