= The Enemy Sex =

1924 film by James Cruze

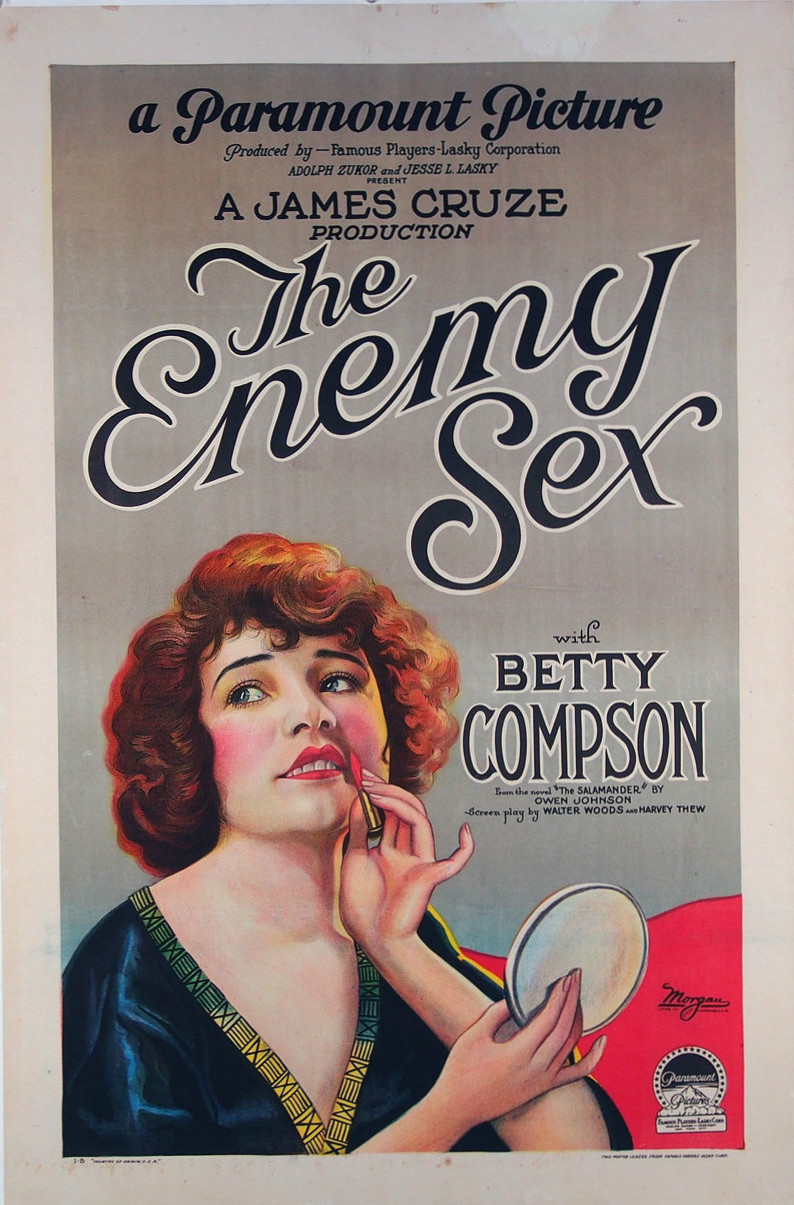
- Theatrical release poster
- Directed by: James Cruze
- Written by: Harvey F. Thew; Walter Woods
- Based on: The Salamander by Owen Johnson
- Produced by: Adolph Zukor; Jesse L. Lasky
- Starring: Betty Compson
- Cinematography: Karl Brown
- Production company: Paramount Pictures
- Distributed by: Paramount Pictures
- Release date: August 25, 1924
- Running time: 80 minutes
- Country: United States
- Language: Silent (English intertitles)

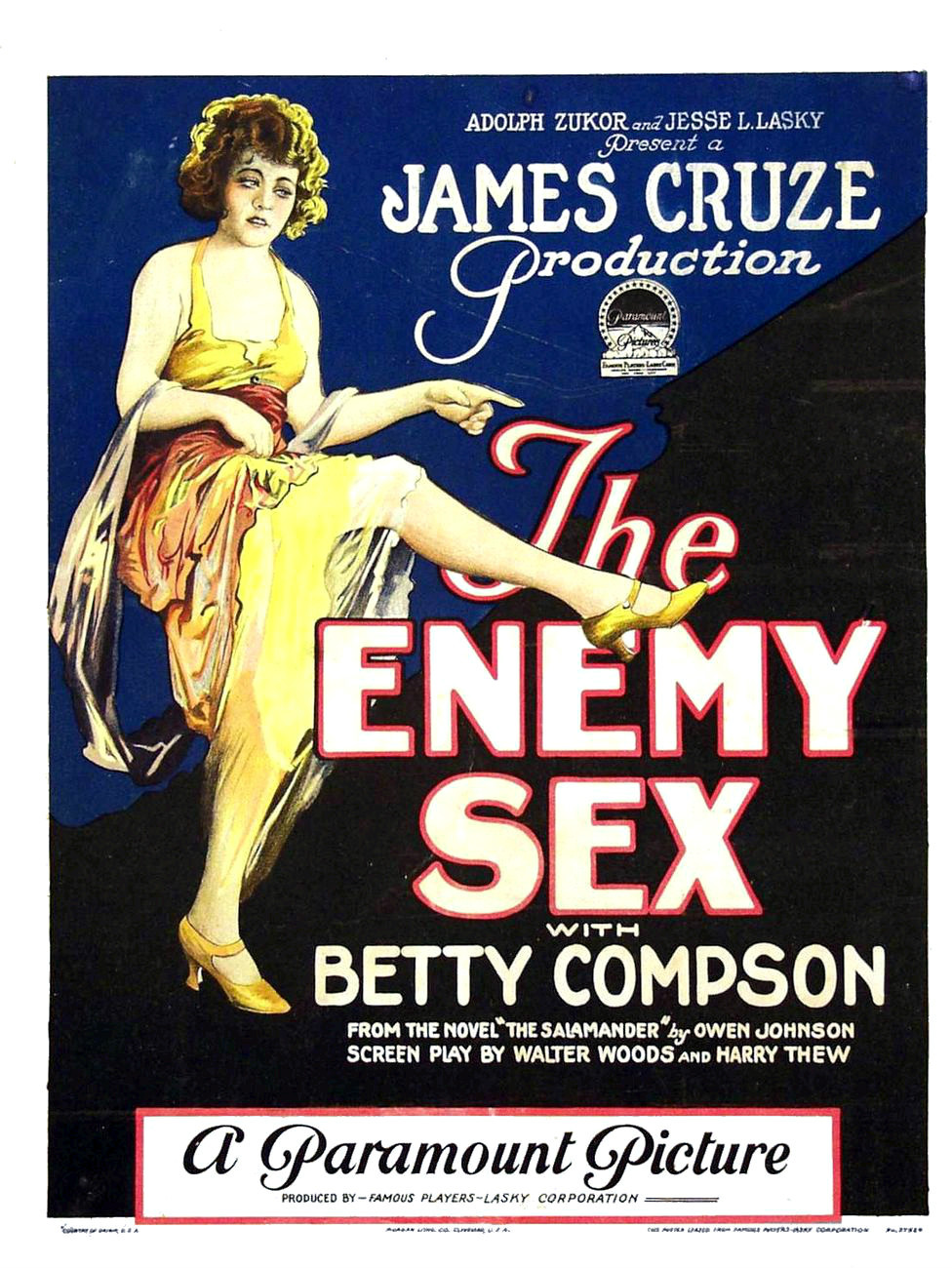
alternate poster.

The Enemy Sex is a 1924 American silent drama film starring Betty Compson and directed by her husband James Cruze. It was produced by Famous Players–Lasky and released by Paramount Pictures. It is taken from the 1914 novel The Salamander by Owen Johnson.

== Plot ==
When showgirl "Dodo" Baxter is invited to a party hosted by the millionaire Albert Sassoon, she meets five wealthy, worldly men who try every means to add her to their list of conquests; however, she eludes their attempts and declines their offers of riches and assistance with her show business career, choosing instead to dedicate herself to helping a drunkard, Gary Lindaberry, regain his health.

== Cast ==
- Betty Compson as "Dodo" Baxter
- Percy Marmont as Garry Lindaberry
- Sheldon Lewis as Albert Edward Sassoon
- Huntley Gordon as Judge Massingale
- Kathlyn Williams as Mrs. Massingale
- DeWitt Jennings as Harrigan Blood
- Edward Faust as Comte de Joncy (credited as Ed Faust)
- William H. Turner as Blaineey
- Pauline Bush as Miss Snyder
- Dot Farley as Ida Summers
- William Austin as Joe's Friend (uncredited)
- Dorothy Dwan as Showgirl (uncredited)
- Pauline French as Undetermined Secondary Role (uncredited)

== Censorship ==
Films during that period were subject to censorship by state and city censor boards. The Board of Motion Picture Review of Worcester, Massachusetts, banned the showing of The Enemy Sex and the novel upon which it was based was also removed from circulation in the city library.

== Preservation ==
A complete print of The Enemy Sex is held by the Library of Congress at its Packard Campus.
