= Thirty Days (1922 film) =

1922 film by James Cruze

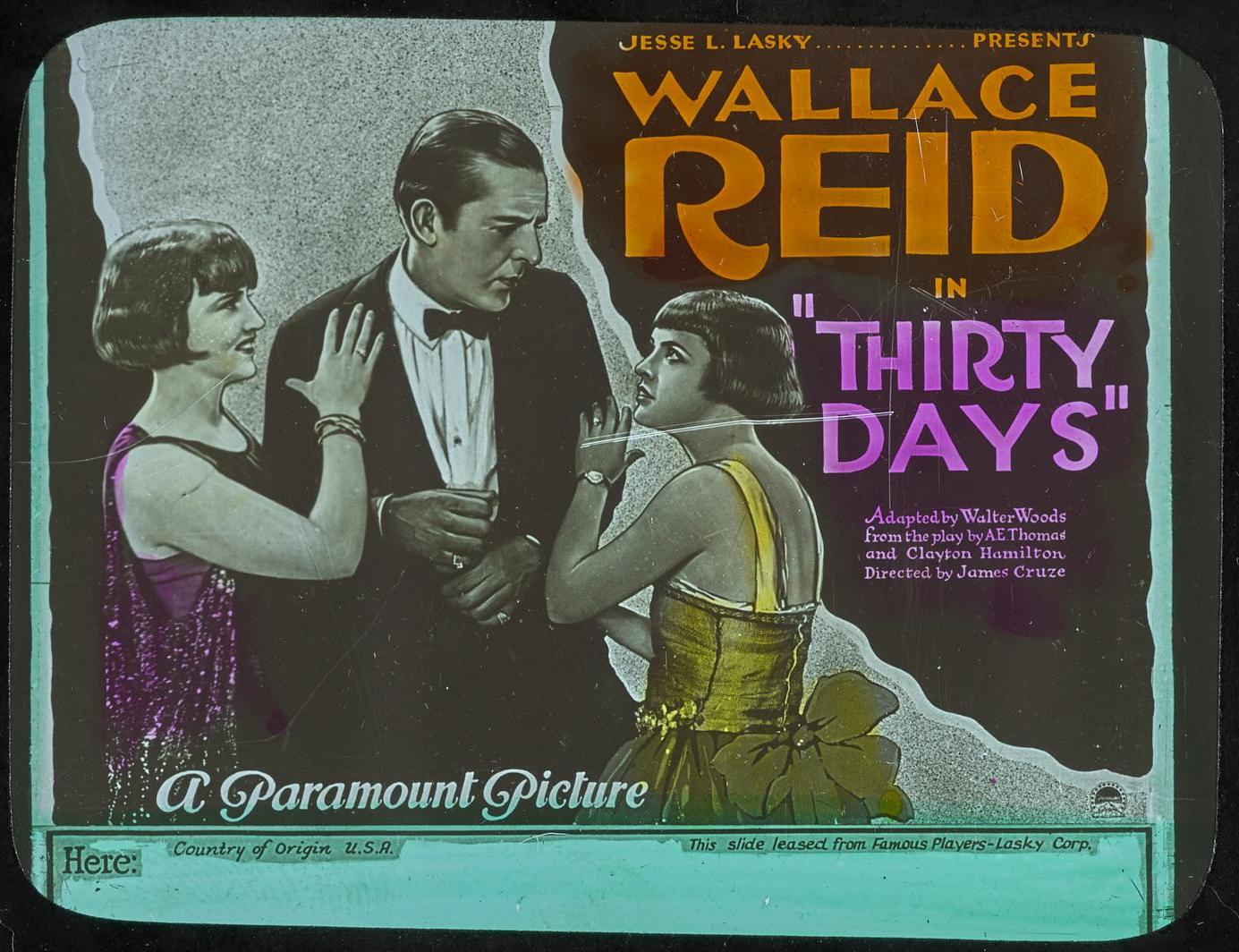
- Lantern slide
- Directed by: James Cruze
- Written by: Walter Woods (scenario)
- Based on: Thirty Days by A. E. Thomas and Clayton Hamilton
- Produced by: Adolph Zukor; Jesse L. Lasky
- Starring: Wallace Reid
- Cinematography: Karl Brown
- Production company: Famous Players–Lasky
- Distributed by: Paramount Pictures
- Release dates: December 10, 1922 (NYC); January 8, 1923 (US)
- Running time: 5 reels (4,930 feet)
- Country: United States
- Language: Silent (English intertitles)

Thirty Days is a 1922 American silent comedy film produced by Famous Players–Lasky and distributed by Paramount Pictures. The film is a farce based on the play Thirty Days by A. E. Thomas and Clayton Hamilton which did not make it to Broadway.

The film was directed by James Cruze and stars idol Wallace Reid in his last screen performance. Reviews of the film claimed Reid looked tired and haggard throughout the production and garnered generally bad reviews. This is now considered a lost film.

== Plot ==
As described in a film publication, because of his flirtatious tendencies, young and wealthy society man John Floyd is put on 30 days' probation by his sweetheart Lucille Ledyard. She gets him to assist her in settlement work. He ends up soothing Carlotta, a young woman in a tough Italian section, when her husband Giacomo Polenta comes home and chases John with a knife. John escapes, but Giacomo, who is wanted by the police, takes a job as a butler in the Floyd home until he has a chance to skip to Italy. Carlotta comes to warn John, but Giacomo sees her and chases her down the street with a carving knife until he is nabbed by a police officer. Judge Hooker, a friend of the Floyds', suggests that John seek safety in jail for 30 days until Giacomo leaves for Italy, so John goes and assaults a friend and rival, is arrested, and sent to jail by the judge. In jail he runs into Giacomo but is able to escape him. Giacomo is released, but waits for John outside the prison. Lucille and a friend visit John. When released, John is tied up by some criminals and put on a steamer headed for Italy. In the end, John and Lucille are reconciled.

== Cast ==
- Wallace Reid as John Floyd
- Wanda Hawley as Lucille Ledyard
- Charles Ogle as Judge Hooker
- Cyril Chadwick as Huntley Palmer
- Herschel Mayall as Giacomo Polenta
- Helen Dunbar as Mrs. Floyd
- Carmen Phillips as Carlotta
- Kalla Pasha as Warden
- Robert Brower as Professor Huxley

== See also ==
- Wallace Reid filmography
