= Stark Love =

1927 film

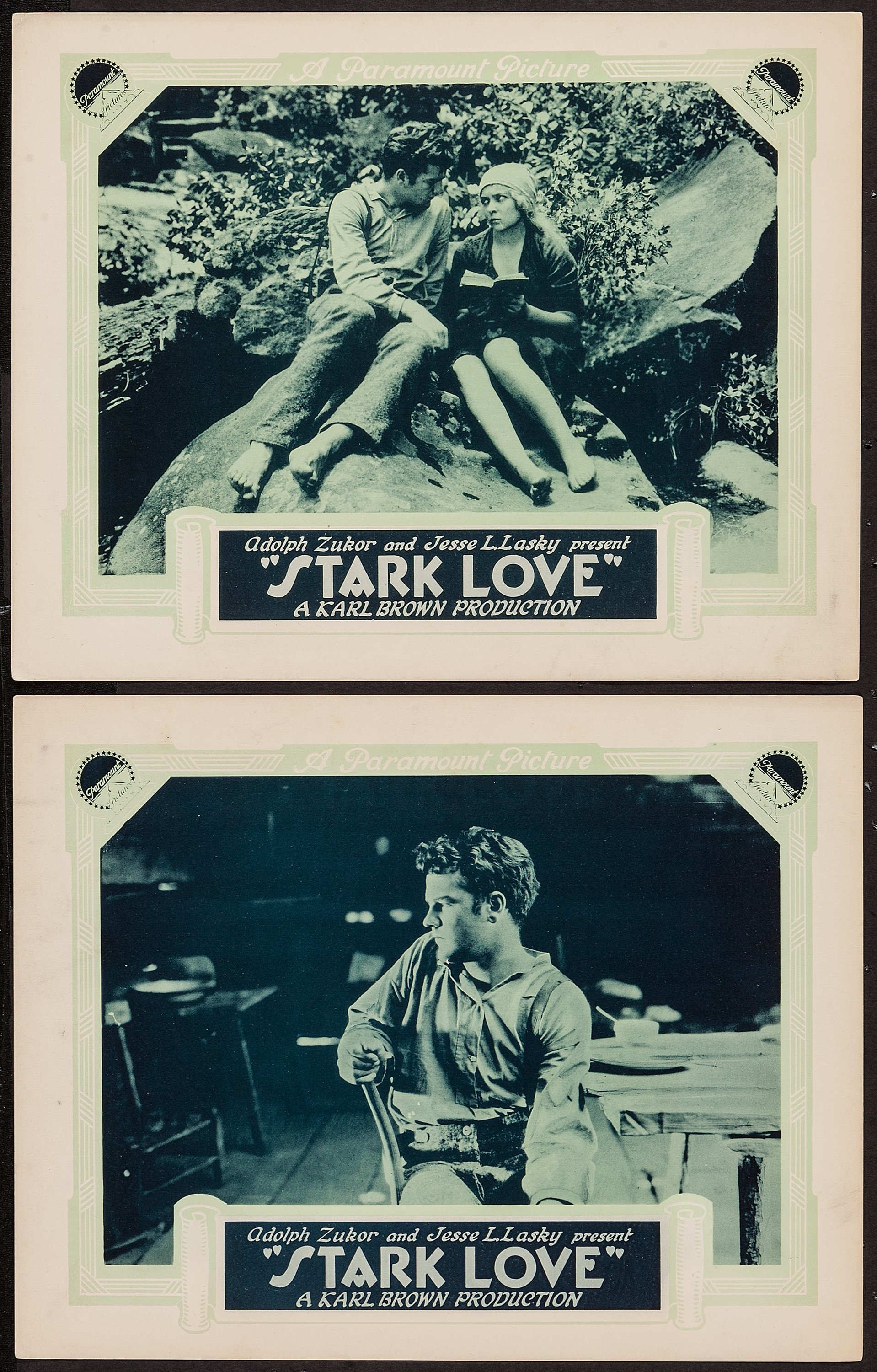
- Two lobby cards
- Directed by: Karl Brown; Paul Wing (asst. director)
- Written by: Karl Brown; Walter Woods
- Produced by: Karl Brown; William LeBaron; Adolph Zukor; Jesse L. Lasky
- Starring: Helen Mundy; Forrest James
- Cinematography: James Murray; Richard Pittack (asst. camera)
- Distributed by: Paramount Pictures
- Release date: February 28, 1927
- Running time: 70 minutes, 7 reels; 6,203 ft.
- Country: United States
- Languages: Silent (English intertitles)

Stark Love (1927) is an American silent feature film directed by Karl Brown and released by Paramount Famous Lasky Corporation, now known as Paramount Pictures. The film was cast almost exclusively with amateur actors and filmed entirely in the Great Smoky Mountains, near Robbinsville, North Carolina.

In 2009, it was selected for preservation in the National Film Registry by the Library of Congress for being "culturally, historically or aesthetically" significant.

An account of the movie's making, and its aftermath, can be found in the book Hillbillyland: What the Movies Did to the Mountains and What the Mountains Did to the Movies by J. W. Williamson.

The star of the film, Forrest James, is the father of Fob James, 48th governor of Alabama.

== Plot synopsis ==
"Amidst the primitive mountain culture of the Carolina hills lives young Rob Warwick. He, unlike his fellowmen, has learned to read and entertains ambitions of another life. He learns of another world, where woman is looked up to by man, who builds a home for her and protects and supports her, as opposed to the position of drudge that she maintains in his society. Fired with ambition to attend school, he tells young Barbara, whose parents are his nearest neighbors, of his plans. When the itinerant minister arrives to perform the yearly marriage and burial services, Rob goes with him to the settlement, sells his horse, pays the tuition for schooling, but enrolls Barbara in his place. He returns to find that his mother has died and that his father, left with a brood to care for, has selected Barbara to be his wife. Rob pleads with his father but is beaten; the girl is aroused to threaten Warwick with an ax, and she escapes with the boy, floating down the swollen stream to the settlement and freedom".

== Cast ==
- Helen Mundy – Barbara Allen
- Forrest James – Rob Warwick
- Reb Grogan – 'Quill' Allen
- Silas Miracle – Jason Warwick

== History of the film ==
Stark Love was released by Paramount Pictures on February 28, 1927. When the film was released it was praised for its documentary realism. Even with such praise, the film was not a commercial success. Paramount most likely burned the picture along with 1,014 other feature silent films, for the silver they contained. But in 1968 a single original copy of the film was found in the Czechoslovak film archives. The film was discovered by British film historian Kevin Brownlow. Brownlow found the picture while filming in Prague. After the picture was discovered copies were made for the Museum of Modern Art and the United States Library of Congress. The film was selected for screening at the 1969 New York Film Festival. After the film's short-lived revival, the film went back into obscurity. Besides scholars and those few who saw a screening, the film is still widely unknown.
