= Crazy to Marry =

1921 film directed by James Cruze

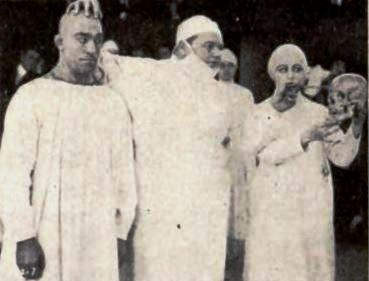
- Film still
- Directed by: James Cruze
- Written by: Frank Condon; Walter Woods
- Starring: Fatty Arbuckle
- Cinematography: Karl Brown
- Distributed by: Paramount Pictures
- Release date: August 28, 1921
- Running time: 5 reels
- Country: United States
- Language: Silent (English intertitles)

Crazy to Marry is a 1921 American silent comedy film directed by James Cruze and starring Fatty Arbuckle. Prints are held by Cinematheque Royale de Belgique, Brussels and Gosfilmofond, Russian State Archive, Moscow.

== Plot ==
Dr. Hobart Hupp, who thinks he can treat prisoners with surgery and tests, finds himself facing an unexpected and twisted challenge.

== Cast ==
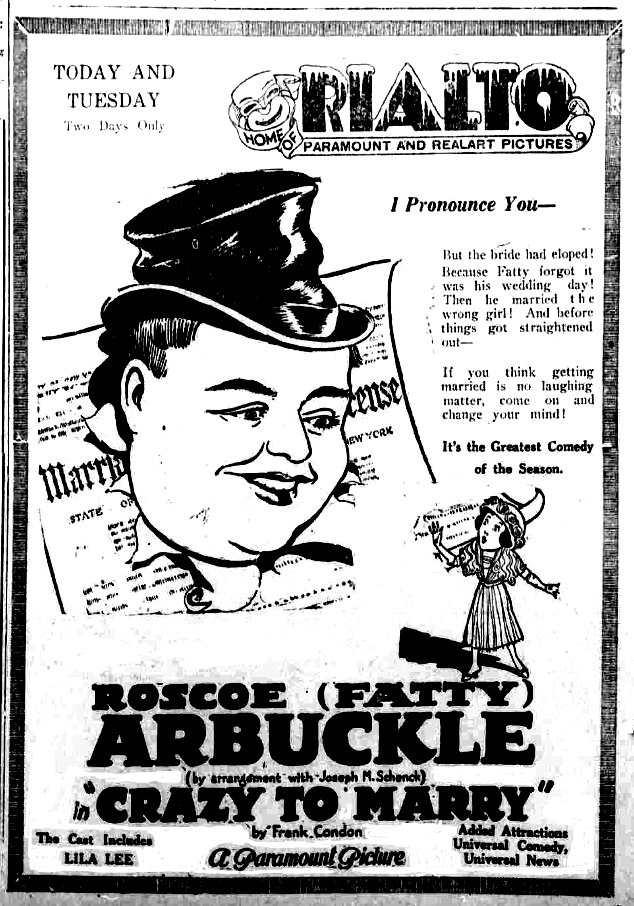
newspaper ad for the film

- Roscoe "Fatty" Arbuckle as Dr. Hobart Hupp
- Lila Lee as Annabelle Landis
- Laura Anson as Estrella De Morgan
- Edwin Stevens as Henry De Morgan
- Lillian Leighton as Sarah De Morgan
- Bull Montana as Dago Red (a crook)
- Allen Durnell as Arthur Simmons
- Sidney Bracey as Col. Landis
- Genevieve Blinn as Mrs. Landis
- Clarence Burton as Gregory Slade (a lawyer)
- Henry Johnson as Norman Gregory
- Charles Ogle as Cement man
- Jackie Young as Cupid
- Lucien Littlefield as Minister
