= Gasoline Gus =

1921 film directed by James Cruze

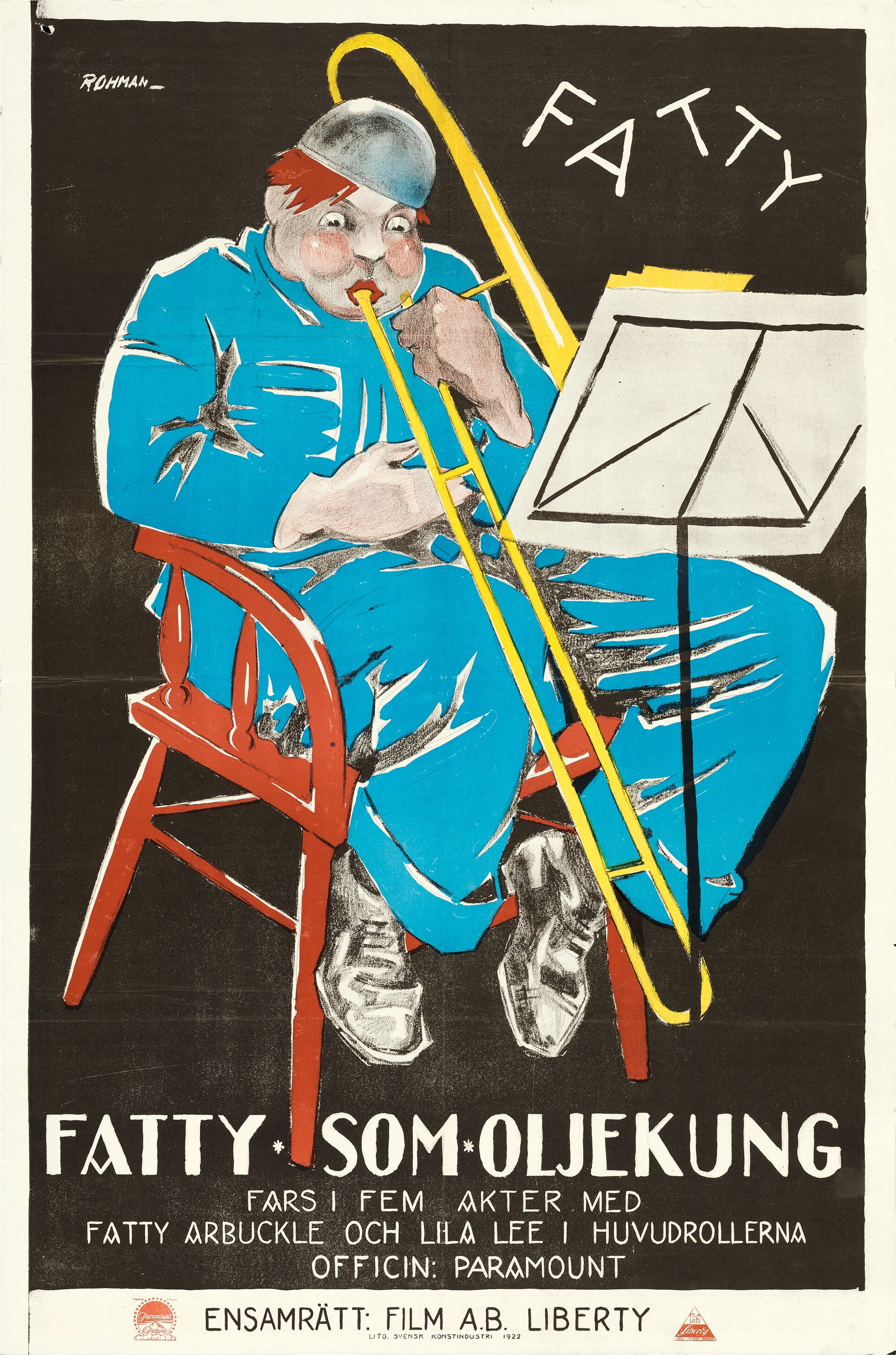
- Swedish theatrical release poster
- Directed by: James Cruze
- Written by: George Pattullo; Walter Woods
- Starring: Fatty Arbuckle
- Cinematography: Karl Brown
- Distributed by: Paramount Pictures
- Release date: August 20, 1921
- Running time: 5 reels
- Country: United States
- Language: Silent (English intertitles)

Gasoline Gus is a 1921 American comedy film directed by James Cruze and starring Fatty Arbuckle. Prints of Gasoline Gus are held at the Gosfilmofond archive in Russia and Cinematheque Belgique.

== Cast ==
- Roscoe "Fatty" Arbuckle as Gasoline Gus
- Lila Lee as Sal Jo Banty
- Charles Ogle as Nate Newberry
- Theodore Lorch as Dry Check Charlie
- Wilton Taylor as Judge Shortridge
- Knute Erickson as 'Scrap Iron' Swenson
- Fred Huntley

== Other media ==
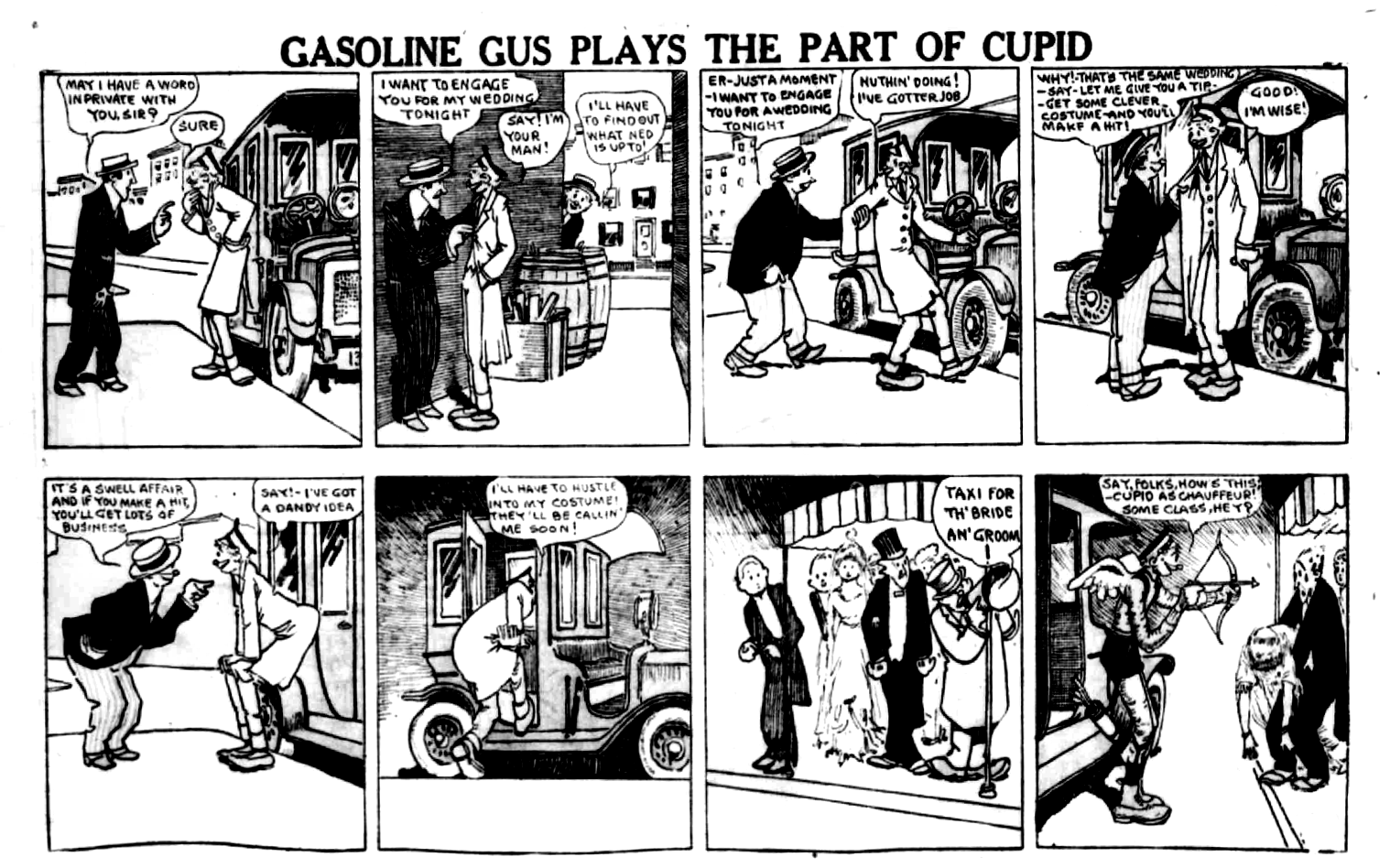
Typical Gasoline Gus cartoon, published in 1920.

Gasoline Gus is an early 20th century popular culture figure who also appeared in cartoon strips and a record single, both of which precede the film. The comic strip was written by O.P. Williams and was syndicated by the Philadelphia North American between 1913 and 1914. Gasoline Gus was a taxi driver and car fanatic who constantly wrecked his early automobile. Billy Murray and the American Quartet recorded the song "Gasoline Gus and his Jitney Bus" in 1915.

The petroleum scientist and Director of Universal Oil Products, Gustav Egloff, was nicknamed Gasoline Gus from 1915.

== See also ==
- Fatty Arbuckle filmography
