= Terror Island =

1920 film by James Cruze

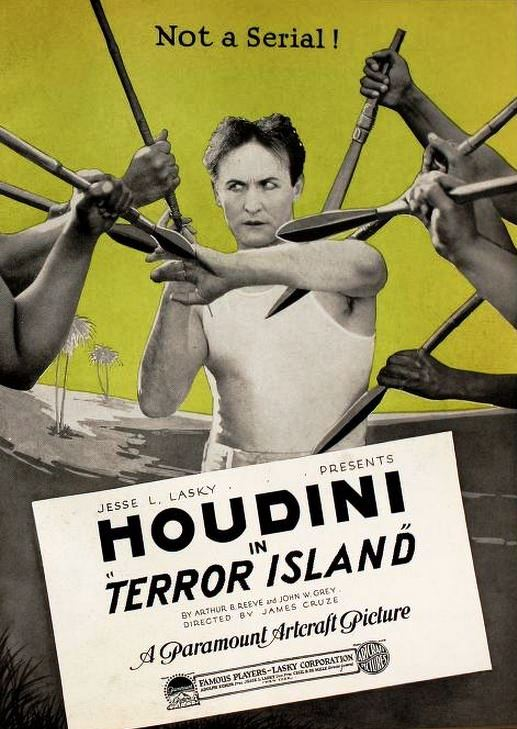
- Directed by: James Cruze
- Written by: Walter Woods (adaptation)
- Story by: Arthur B. Reeve; John W. Grey
- Produced by: Jesse Lasky
- Starring: Harry Houdini; Lila Lee
- Cinematography: William Marshall
- Production company: Realart Productions
- Distributed by: Paramount Pictures
- Release date: April 1920
- Running time: 5 reels; (originally 7 reels)
- Country: United States
- Language: Silent (English intertitles)

A 5-reel 1922 version of the film.

Terror Island is a 1920 American silent adventure film produced by Jesse Lasky and directed by James Cruze. It is a starring vehicle for illusionist Harry Houdini here costarring with Lila Lee. The film had the working title of Salvage.

== Plot ==
Beverly West appeals to Harry Harper, the inventor of a submarine device for salvaging sunken vessels, to help her rescue her father from the South Sea natives who are holding him as a ransom for the skull shaped pearl that Beverly possesses. Also desirous of the pearl is Job Mourdant, Beverly's guardian, who kidnaps his ward and heads out to sea. Harry follows and saves Beverly when Mourdant throws her overboard.

After the two parties arrive on the island, Harry is captured but escapes in time to see the natives thrust Beverly into an iron safe and throw her into the sea. Once again, Harry saves the girl, and finally procures the gems after struggling with a man in a diving suit. Harry then so impresses the natives with his magic that they release Beverly and her father and the three set sail for home.

== Cast ==
- Harry Houdini as Harry Harper
- Lila Lee as Beverly West, niece of Job Mordaunt
- Jack Brammall as Ensign Tom Starkey
- Wilton Taylor as Job Mordaunt
- Eugene Pallette as Guy Mordaunt
- Edward Brady as Captain Marsh
- Frank Bonner as Chief Bakaida
- Ted E. Duncan as First Officer Murphy
- Fred Turner as Mr. West
- Rosemary Theby as Sheila Mourdant, Guy Mordaunt's wife

== Preservation ==
The AFI lists Terror Island's length as 7 reels, but only 5 reels appear to survive. The Library of Congress' American Silent Feature Film Database lists the film as incomplete.
