= The Covered Wagon =

1923 American silent Western film

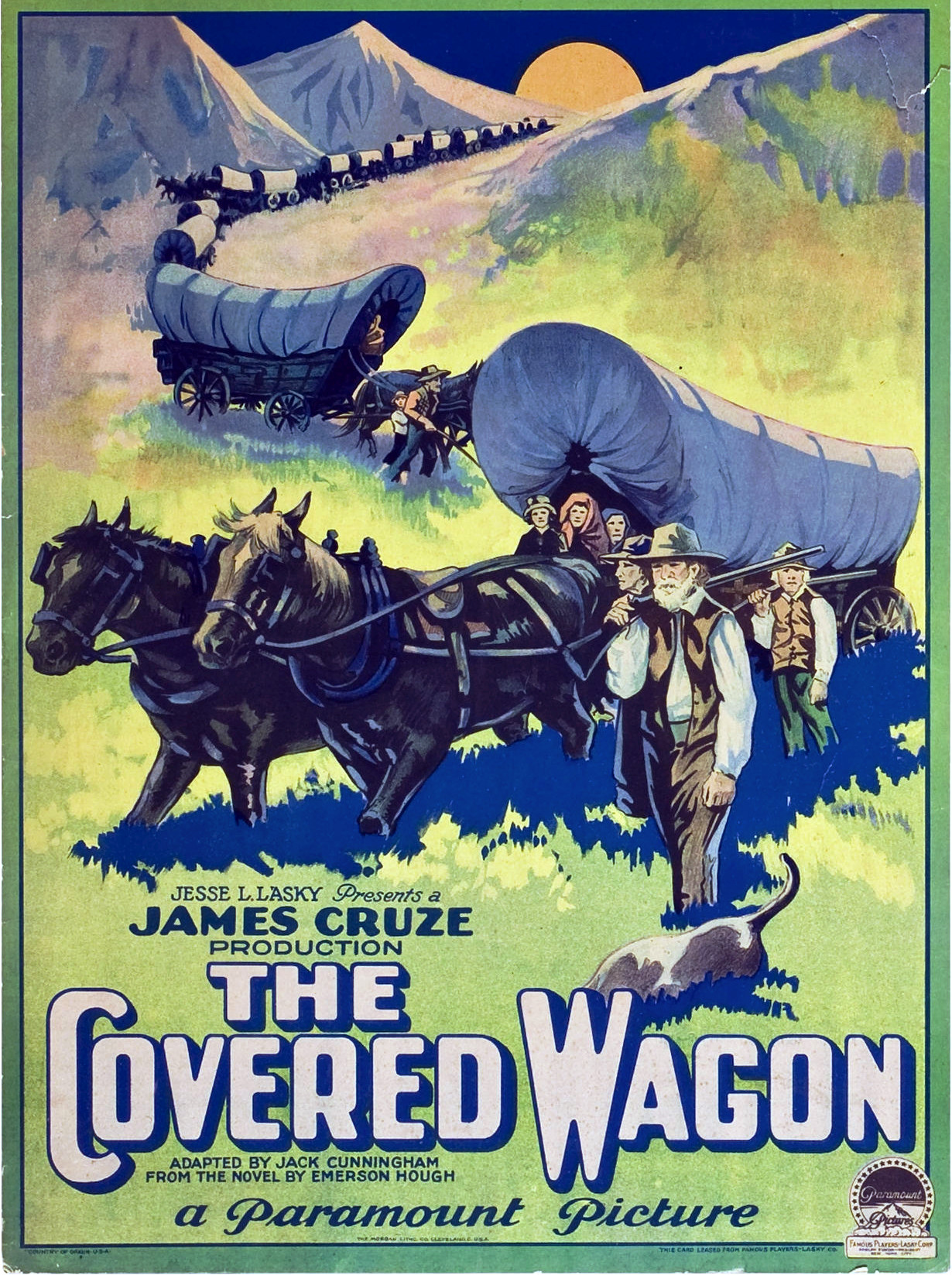
- Theatrical release poster
- Directed by: James Cruze
- Written by: Jack Cunningham (adaptation)
- Based on: The Covered Wagon by Emerson Hough
- Produced by: Jesse L. Lasky
- Starring: J. Warren Kerrigan; Lois Wilson
- Cinematography: Karl Brown
- Edited by: Dorothy Arzner
- Music by: Josiah Zuro; Hugo Riesenfeld
- Production company: Famous Players–Lasky Corporation
- Distributed by: Paramount Pictures
- Release date: March 16, 1923
- Running time: 98 minutes
- Country: United States
- Languages: Silent; English intertitles
- Budget: $782,000 or $336,000
- Box office: $4 million (U.S. and Canada rentals)

The Covered Wagon (full film)

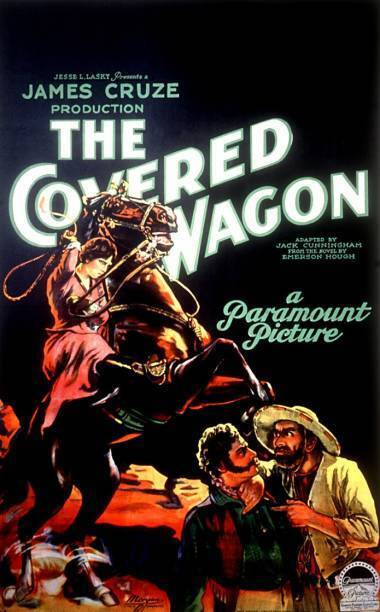
lobby poster

The Covered Wagon is a 1923 American silent epic Western film released by Paramount Pictures. The film was directed by James Cruze based on a 1922 novel of the same name by Emerson Hough about a group of pioneers traveling through the old West from Kansas to Oregon. J. Warren Kerrigan starred as Will Banion and Lois Wilson as Molly Wingate. On their quest they experience desert heat, mountain snow, hunger, and Indian attack.

The Covered Wagon is one of many films from 1923 that entered the public domain in the United States on January 1, 2019.

== Plot ==
The action is set in 1848. Two caravans of expatriates unite in Kansas and travel 2,000 miles west to start a new life in Oregon. The leader of the settlers is the elderly father and natural authority, Wingate. Scouts are the headstrong Sam Woodhull and the kind-hearted, talented Will Banion. Banion has a secret around a crime he is said to have committed in the army.

Along the way, the pioneers suffer a number of hardships such as hunger and bad weather. In addition, Sam Woodhull embroils the settlers in clashes with Indians, and later arouses "gold fever" in some of the pilgrims when news of gold discoveries in California reaches the settlers. A dispute ensues, and many families leave the caravan to go to California.

Time and again Sam Woodhull causes problems. He gets involved with Will Banion in a power struggle for the leadership of the wagon train, and also for the favors of the young Molly Wingate. Fortunately, Banion is succored by his old friend William Jackson, but in the end he leaves the train shortly before reaching Oregon to seek his fortune in California, as Molly's father forbids a connection with his daughter. Unlike many of the Forty-Niners who sought riches in the Golden State, Banion is successful and strikes it rich.

Woodhull, spurned by Molly because she loves Banion, wants to get rid of him in California. He plans to shoot Banion from ambush. Fortunately, Jackson watches the scene and in turn shoots Woodhull dead. With Jackson's news that Molly is expecting him in Oregon, Will Banion and his wealth head for Oregon, where he can finally take Molly into his arms.

== Cast ==
- J. Warren Kerrigan as Will Banion (hero)
- Lois Wilson as Molly Wingate (heroine)
- Alan Hale as Sam Woodhull (villain)
- Ernest Torrence as William Jackson
- Tully Marshall as Jim Bridger
- Ethel Wales as Mrs. Wingate
- Charles Ogle as Jesse Wingate
- Guy Oliver as Kit Carson
- Johnny Fox as Jed Wingate
- James Cruze as Indian (scenes deleted)
- Frank Albertson as Minor Role (uncredited)
- Chief Thunderbird as Indian (uncredited)

Cast notes

- Tim McCoy, as Technical Advisor, recruited the Native Americans who appeared in this movie which included Northern Arapaho Nation from the Wind River Reservation in Wyoming. As he was the only person in the production team who could talk to the Arapahoes, he unwittingly became the technical advisor for the film.

== Production ==
The film was a major production for its time, with an estimate budget of $782,000.

In his 1983 book Classics of the Silent Cinema, radio and TV host Joe Franklin claimed this film was "the first American epic not directed by Griffith".

In the 1980 documentary Hollywood: A Celebration of American Silent Cinema, Jesse L. Lasky Jr. maintained that the goal of director James Cruze was " ... to elevate the Western, which had always been sort of a potboiler kind of film, to the status of an epic".

The film required a large cast and film crew and many extras, and was filmed in various locations, including Palm Springs, California and several places in Nevada and Utah. The dramatic buffalo hunt and buffalo stampede scenes were filmed on Antelope Island, Great Salt Lake, Utah. During filming for the movie, seven bison from the Antelope Island Bison Herd were shot and killed.

The covered wagons gathered by Paramount from all over the Southwest were not replicas, but the real wagons that had brought the pioneers west. They were cherished heirlooms of the families who owned them. The producers offered the owners $2 a day (equal to $37.79 today) and feed for their stock if they would bring the wagons for the movie. Most of the extras seen on film are the families who owned the covered wagons and were perfectly at home driving them and living out of them during the production.

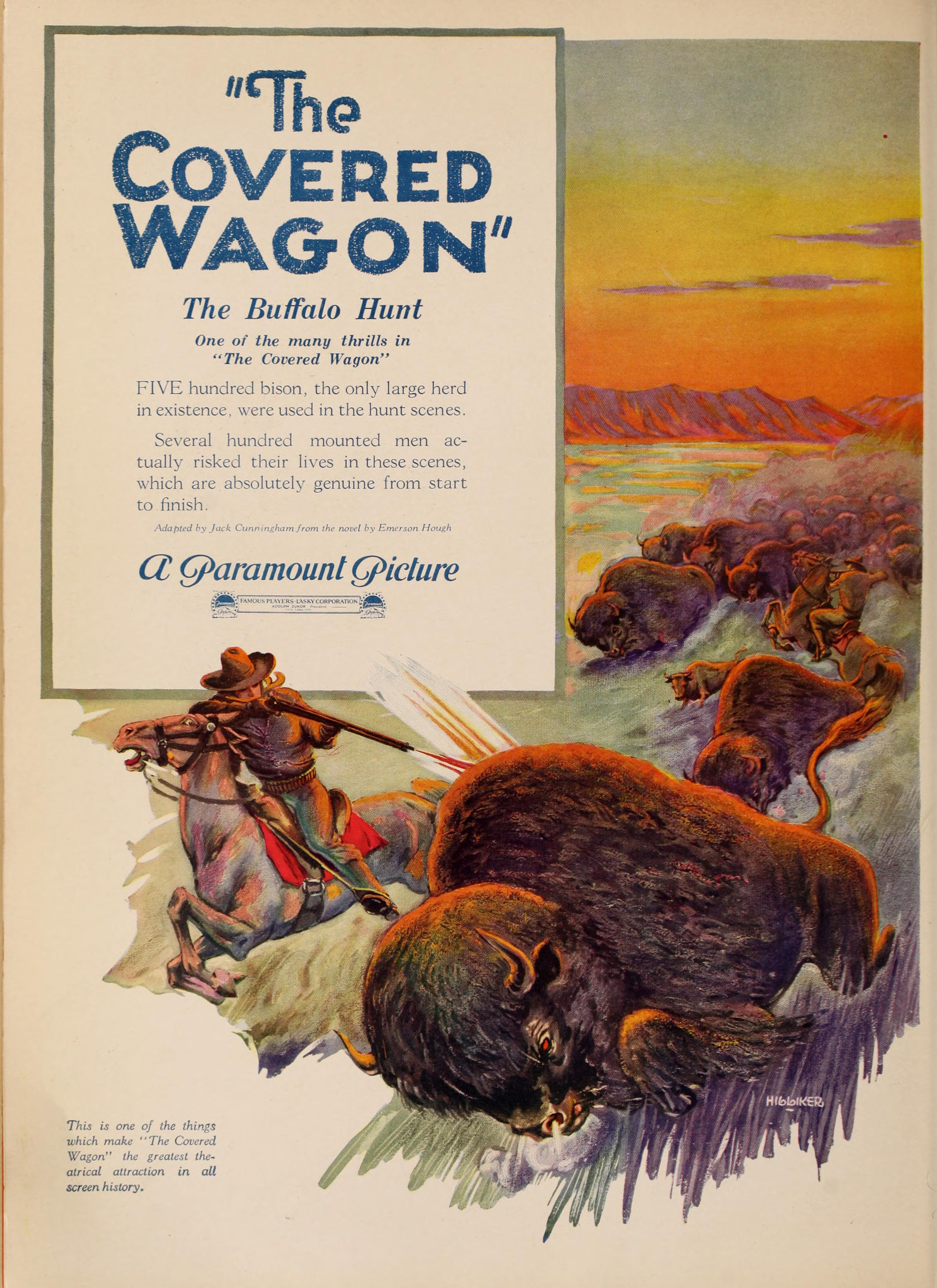
1923 trade magazine ad for The Covered Wagon

== Reception ==
The film premiered in New York City on March 16, 1923, and ran 98 minutes. A musical soundtrack was recorded in the short-lived DeForest Phonofilm sound-on-film process, but sources vary on whether this record soundtrack was of the entire score or about two reels worth of the film. The Phonofilm version of the film was only shown this way at the premiere at the Rivoli Theater in New York City. Paramount reportedly also released Bella Donna on April 1, 1923, with a Phonofilm soundtrack, also only at the premiere at the Rivoli.

The film was the second highest-grossing film of 1923. This was also President Warren G. Harding's favorite film as he showed it at a special screening at the White House during the summer of 1923.

The film is recognized by American Film Institute in these lists:

- 2001: AFI's 100 Years...100 Thrills – Nominated

== See also ==
- The House That Shadows Built (1931) promotional film released by Paramount with excerpt of The Covered Wagon
- Hollywood: A Celebration of the American Silent Film (1980) Episode 9, "Out West" includes a fair amount of footage from The Covered Wagon and interviews with the stars and surviving crew members
