= James Cruze =

American actor and director (1884–1942)

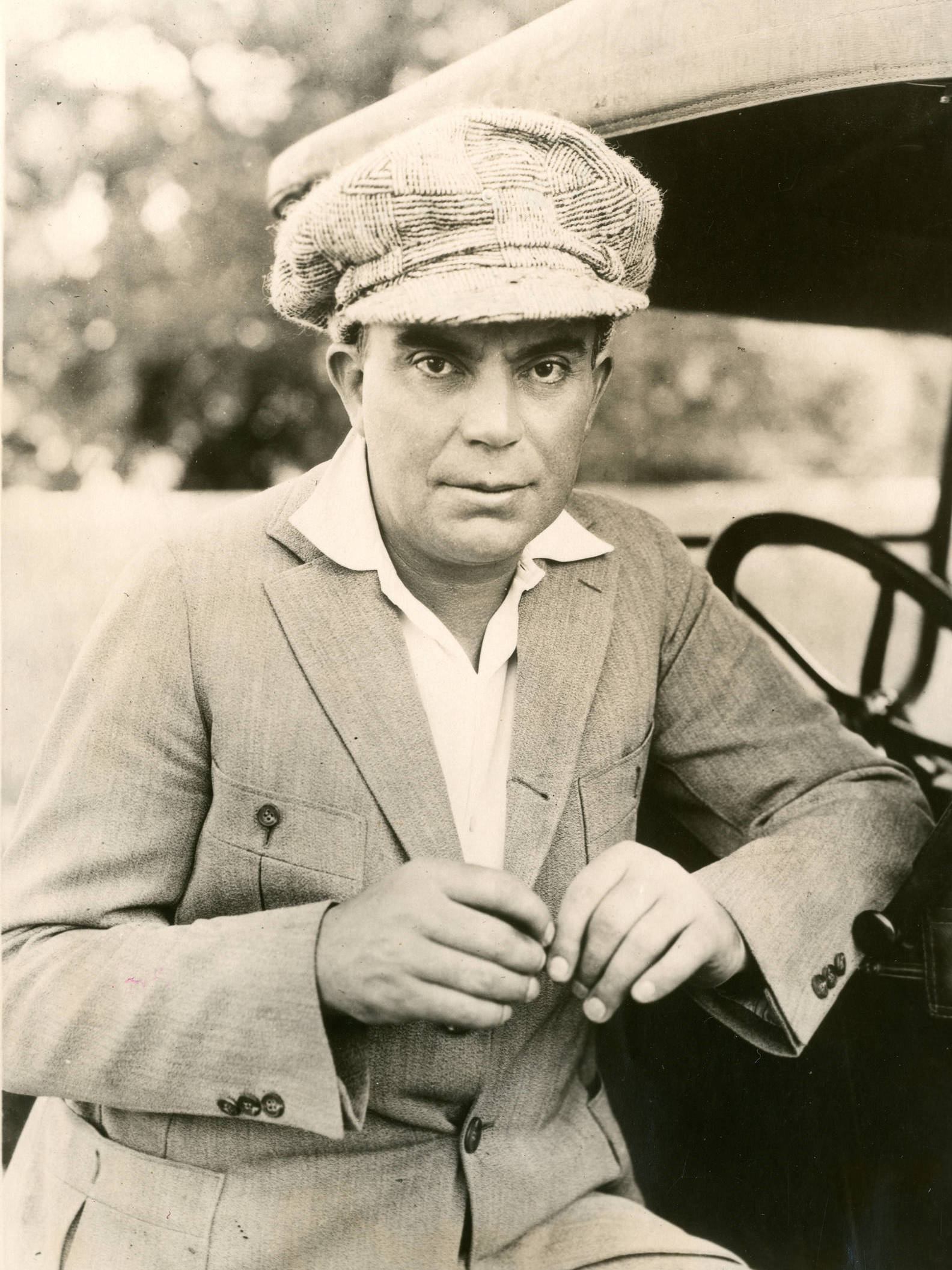
- Cruze in 1923
- Born: Jens Cruz Bosen; March 27, 1884; Ogden, Utah, U.S.
- Died: August 3, 1942 (aged 58); Los Angeles, California, U.S.
- Resting place: Hollywood Forever Cemetery
- Occupations: Actor, film director
- Years active: 1910–1938
- Spouses: ? (m. 1901; died 1907) Marguerite Snow (m. 1913; div. 1923) Betty Compson (m. 1924; div. 1930) Alberta Beatrice McCoy (m. 1941)
- Children: 6

James Cruze (born Jens Cruz Bosen; March 27, 1884 – August 3, 1942) was an American silent film actor and film director.

James Cruze is best known today among film buffs as the director of the epic silent Western The Covered Wagon.

== Personal life ==
Born Jens Cruz Bosen in Ogden, Utah, of Mormon parents, Cruze acquired his middle name solely by virtue of his birth date. As Cruze's longtime friend and colleague, actor Luke Cosgrave, explained in a 1930 interview:

Did you hear how Jimmy and I came together? I was playing in Boise with Charley Murray and we needed a young fellow for the good looking hero parts and I wired for Chester Stevens, who was in San Francisco, sending him a ticket to Boise. He got a job right then and handed the ticket to another young fellow. I met the train two days after I had expected Chester and thought how young he seemed. He soon informed me that he was not Chester but Jens Bosen of Ogden. You see, young Jens was born on March 27 and his mother wanted to name him after some famous man born on the same day, so she looked in the almanac, but no great man had a birthday on that date. But she did find it was the anniversary of the battle of Vera Cruze [sic], so she called him Jens Cruze Bosen.

Birth name notwithstanding, Bosen and/or his parents decided well before his professional stage debut to anglicize at least his given name, as evidenced by the impassioned 8th grade commencement speech he delivered, as James Bosen, at Ogden's Central School in June 1898.

Cruze was first married to a fellow Latter Day Saint, identity unknown, circa 1901 until her death in 1907; they had five children. By no later than 1914, he had married actress Marguerite Snow, and they had a daughter, Julie Jane. They divorced in 1923. He married actress Betty Compson on October 14, 1924; they were divorced in 1930. He married Alberta Beatrice McCoy in June 1941, and they were still wed when he died.

== Career ==
Cruze acted in, directed and or produced over 100 films, mainly during the silent era. His first known acting job was at Lubin Manufacturing Company in 1910. He started at Thanhouser Company in 1911 with She (1911), which is where the majority of his body of work was produced, much of it as the leading man.

After leaving Thanhouser in 1916, he worked for several other companies as director and producer. He became a major director when his 1923 Paramount Pictures production The Covered Wagon became a smash success. This expensive Western was filmed under rugged outdoor conditions, lending Cruze's scenes a realism and stature not seen in routine Saturday-matinee Westerns. Cruze became one of Paramount's top directors, and in 1926 he scored another success with the seagoing saga Old Ironsides, with large-scale action scenes filmed in an experimental widescreen process.

== Turning point ==
When the new sound films replaced silent films, Cruze—then an important enough name to command respect in the industry—became a partner in an ambitious independent film company, Sono Art-World Wide Pictures. Its first production, produced and directed by Cruze, was a musical, The Great Gabbo (1929). In typical Cruze fashion it was an epic musical, with elaborate musical pageants filmed in color. The storyline was much too heavy and macabre for a light musical, however: a crazed ventriloquist (Erich von Stroheim) falls in love with a dancer who loves another, and the ventriloquist's dummy takes on a life of its own, advising and taunting his master.

The Great Gabbo fell far short of expectations at the boxoffice and Cruze, now on the Sono Art staff, found himself directing the company's routine, low-budget melodramas.

Cruze left Sono Art when the company reorganized in 1932, and sought work at his former home studio, Paramount. He was given a chance to direct one sequence in the omnibus feature If I Had a Million (1932). Cruze was battling a problem with alcohol abuse, and the assignment did not lead to further employment. Will Rogers offered him work directing two of the Rogers features at Fox, and the association might have continued had Rogers not died in a plane crash in 1935.

Carl Laemmle, president of Universal Pictures, loved action Westerns and he wanted to make a big outdoor spectacle, along the lines of the well remembered The Covered Wagon. Laemmle hired Cruze (who directed that film) for a new film, Sutter's Gold (1936), chronicling the California gold rush of 1849. The studio assembled a "name" cast of popular character players including Edward Arnold, Lee Tracy, Harry Carey, and Binnie Barnes. Unfortunately neither the studio nor the film had any big "star" names to attract moviegoers, and—dooming the project—Laemmle had given director Cruze carte blanche to make the film and Cruze spent money lavishly, as was his custom in the silent days. The expenditure was too lavish for the budget-conscious Universal, and the no-star spectacle failed disastrously. Sutter's Gold damaged James Cruze's standing irreparably and it ruined Universal. A consortium of investors ousted Carl Laemmle and took over the company (now known as "the NEW Universal"). The only real benefit Universal derived from Sutter's Gold was its value as stock footage; Cruze's carefully staged outdoor scenes were often edited into the studio's low-budget adventures, Westerns, and serials.

Cruze, with the notoriety of the Sutter's Gold fiasco haunting his career, found work at Republic Pictures, a "budget" independent studio specializing in action and Western fare. Cruze directed four undistinguished features there in 1937 and 1938. His Republic contract was not renewed, which brought an end to James Cruze's career. During his decline he descended further into alcoholism, and he spent the last four years of his life unemployed. His fortunes had a temporary lift when he remarried in 1941, but his happiness was short-lived and he died by his own hand on August 3, 1942, at his home in Hollywood, California, aged 58. His cremated remains are interred at Hollywood Forever Cemetery.

== Filmography ==
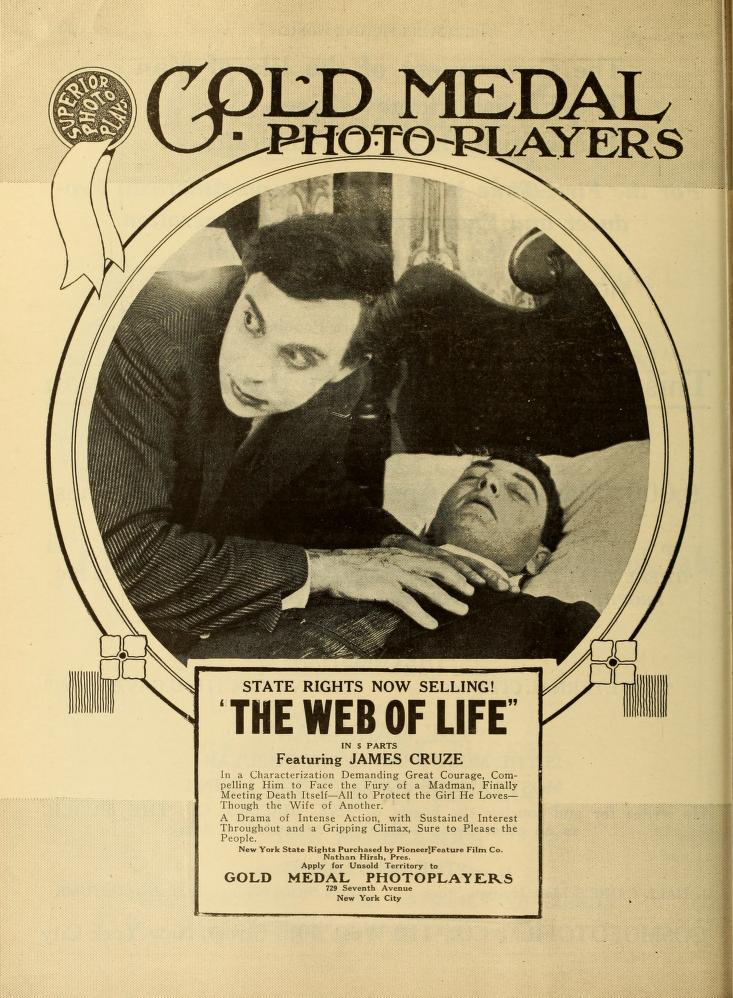
Cruze in The Web of Life (1917)

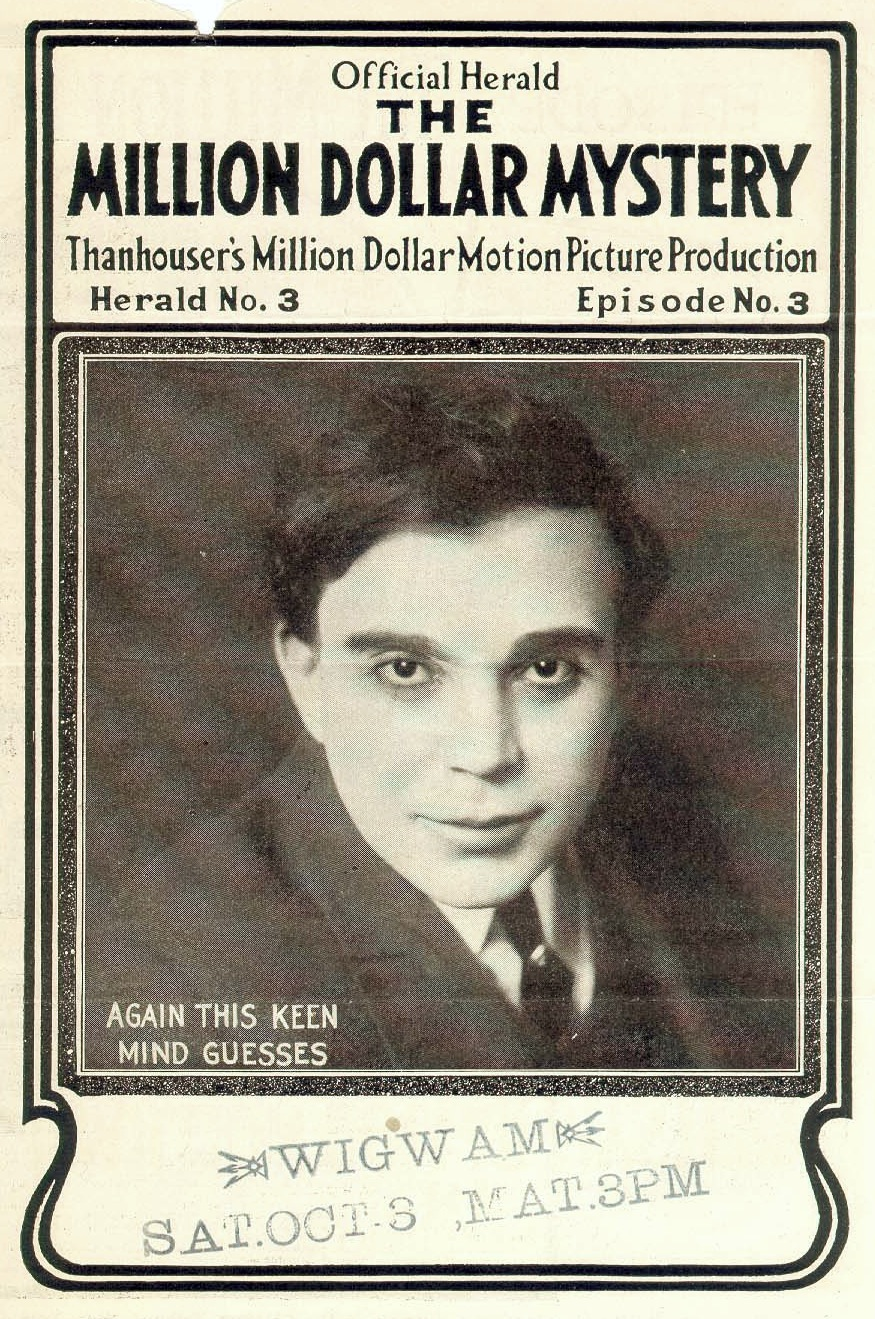
Cruze in The Million Dollar Mystery (1914)

=== As director ===
| Year | Films | Notes |
|---|---|---|
| 1914 | From Wash to Washington | Short Film |
| 1914 | The Cat's Paw | Short Film |
| 1918 | Too Many Millions | Lost Film |
| 1919 | The Dub | Lost Film |
| 1919 | Alias Mike Moran | Lost Film |
| 1919 | The Roaring Road | |
| 1919 | You're Fired | |
| 1919 | The Love Burglar | Lost Film |
| 1919 | The Valley of the Giants | Lost Film |
| 1919 | The Lottery Man | Lost Film |
| 1919 | Hawthorne of the U.S.A. | |
| 1919 | An Adventure in Hearts | Lost Film |
| 1920 | Terror Island | 5 of 7 reels are extant |
| 1920 | Mrs. Temple's Telegram | |
| 1920 | The Sins of St. Anthony | Lost Film |
| 1920 | What Happened to Jones | Lost Film |
| 1920 | Food for Scandal | Lost Film |
| 1920 | A Full House | Lost Film |
| 1920 | Always Audacious | Lost Film |
| 1921 | The Charm School | Lost Film |
| 1921 | The Dollar-a-Year Man | Lost Film |
| 1921 | Gasoline Gus | |
| 1921 | Crazy to Marry | |
| 1922 | One Glorious Day | Lost Film |
| 1922 | Is Matrimony a Failure? | Lost Film |
| 1922 | The Fast Freight | Lost Film |
| 1922 | The Dictator | Lost Film |
| 1922 | The Old Homestead | |
| 1922 | Thirty Days | Lost Film |
| 1923 | The Covered Wagon | |
| 1923 | Hollywood | Lost Film |
| 1923 | Ruggles of Red Gap | Lost Film |
| 1923 | To the Ladies | Lost Film |
| 1924 | Leap Year | |
| 1924 | The Fighting Coward | |
| 1924 | The Enemy Sex | |
| 1924 | Merton of the Movies | Lost Film based on the novel by Harry Leon Wilson and the play by George S. Kaufman and Marc Connelly |
| 1924 | The City That Never Sleeps | Lost Film |
| 1924 | The Garden of Weeds | Lost Film |
| 1925 | The Goose Hangs High | Lost Film |
| 1925 | Waking Up the Town | |
| 1925 | Welcome Home | based on a play by George S. Kaufman and Edna Ferber |
| 1925 | Beggar on Horseback | Only 3 of 7 reels are extant based on the play by George S. Kaufman and Marc Connelly |
| 1925 | Marry Me | Lost Film |
| 1925 | The Pony Express | |
| 1926 | Mannequin | |
| 1926 | Old Ironsides | partly filmed in experimental widescreen process called "Magnascope" |
| 1926 | The Waiter from the Ritz | unreleased |
| 1927 | We're All Gamblers | Lost Film |
| 1927 | The City Gone Wild | Lost Film |
| 1928 | On to Reno | |
| 1928 | The Mating Call | |
| 1928 | The Red Mark | |
| 1928 | Excess Baggage | Lost Film |
| 1929 | The Duke Steps Out | Lost Film |
| 1929 | A Man's Man | Lost Film |
| 1929 | The Great Gabbo | |
| 1930 | Once a Gentleman | |
| 1930 | She Got What She Wanted | |
| 1931 | Salvation Nell | based on the play by Edward Sheldon |
| 1932 | Washington Merry-Go-Round | |
| 1932 | If I Had a Million | segment "Death Cell" |
| 1933 | Best of Enemies | re-shoots and additional scenes |
| 1933 | Racetrack | |
| 1933 | Sailor Be Good | |
| 1933 | I Cover the Waterfront | |
| 1933 | Mr. Skitch | |
| 1934 | David Harum | |
| 1934 | Their Big Moment | |
| 1934 | Helldorado | |
| 1935 | Two-Fisted | |
| 1936 | Sutter's Gold | |
| 1937 | The Wrong Road | |
| 1938 | Prison Nurse | |
| 1938 | Gangs of New York | |
| 1938 | Come On, Leathernecks! | |

=== As actor ===
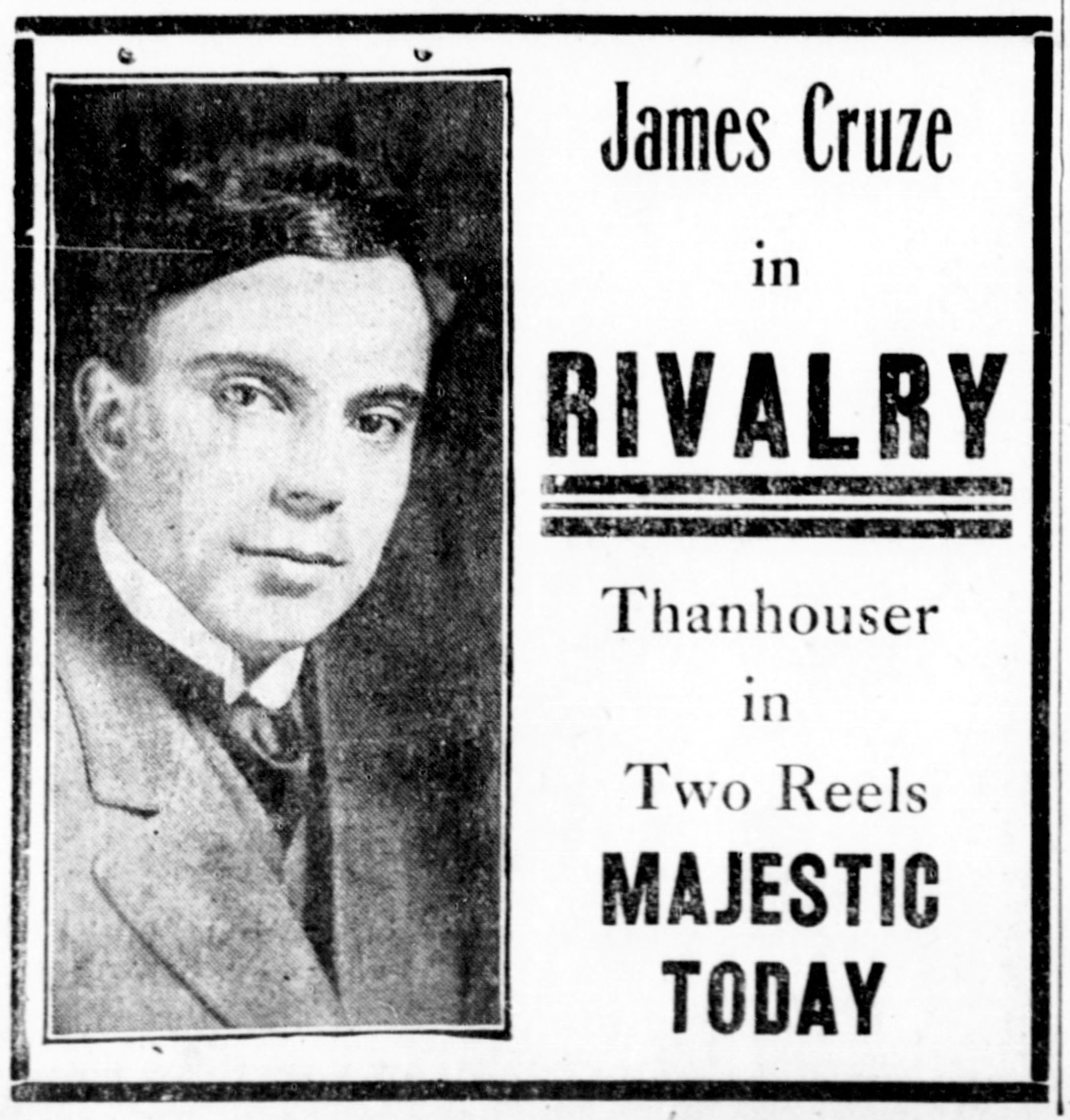
Newspaper advertisement for Rivalry (1914)

- Dr. Jekyll and Mr. Hyde (1912)
- The Covered Wagon (1923) (scenes deleted) .... Indian (Cruze was also director)
- The Slave Market (1921)
- Johnny Get Your Gun (1919) .... The Duke of Bullconia
- Under the Top (1919) .... 'Foxy' Stillmore
- The Source (1918) .... Langlois
- Less Than Kin (1918) .... Jinx
- The City of Dim Faces (1918) .... Wing Lung
- Believe Me, Xantippe (1918) .... Simp Calloway
- Wild Youth (1918) .... Li Choo
- The Hidden Pearls (1918) .... Koro Leon
- Nan of Music Mountain (1917) .... Gale Morgan
- The Call of the East (1917) .... Janzo
- On the Level (1917) .... Ozmun
- What Money Can't Buy (1917) .... Ferdinand Vaslof
- The Web of Life (1917) .... Tom Wilson
- Her Temptation (1917) .... Walton Maynard
- The Snowbird (1916) .... Bruce Mitchell
- Armstrong's Wife (1915) .... Harvey Arnold
- His Guardian Auto (1915)
- The Patriot and the Spy (1915) .... Pietro
- The Heart of the Princess Marsari (1915)
- Zudora (1914) .... Hassam Ali/Jim Baird, Reporter (film was retitled The Twenty Million Dollar Mystery)
- From Wash to Washington (1914)
- The Million Dollar Mystery (1914) .... Jim Norton
- Rivalry (1914)
- A Dog of Flanders (1914)
- A Debut in the Secret Service (1914)
- The Cat's Paw (1914)
- The Desert Tribesman (1914)
- Cardinal Richelieu's Ward (1914) .... Richelieu
- A Leak in the Foreign Office (1914)
- Joseph in the Land of Egypt (1914) .... Joseph
- Why Reginald Reformed (1914)
- The Woman Pays (1914)
- The Adventures of a Diplomatic Freelance (1914)
- Frou Frou (1914) .... Comte Paul de Valreas
- The Legend of Provence (1913) .... Sir Henry
- The Silver-Tongued Orator (1913)
- The Plot Against the Governor (1913)
- A Daughter Worth While (1913)
- Moths (1913) .... Undetermined Name, villain
- Robin Hood (1913) (uncredited)
- The Message to Headquarters (1913)
- The Ward of the King (1913)
- An Unromantic Maiden (1913)
- Tannhäuser (1913)
- The Lost Combination (1913)
- The Snare of Fate (1913)
- Marble Heart (1913) .... Raphael
- Her Sister's Secret (1913)
- Rosie's Revenge (1913)
- The Woman Who Did Not Care (1913)
- Cymbeline (1913) .... Leonatus
- For Her Boy's Sake (1913)
- Her Gallant Knights (1913)
- The Idol of the Hour (1913)
- Good Morning, Judge (1913)
- The Dove in the Eagle's Nest (1913) .... The Eagle
- The Tiniest of Stars (1913) .... The Musician
- A Poor Relation (1913)
- When Ghost Meets Ghost (1913)
- A Militant Suffragette (1912) .... John Strong, Mary's Fiancé
- The Star of Bethlehem (1912) .... Micah, Joseph
- The Other Half (1912) .... The Father
- The Forest Rose (1912) .... Albert as an Older Man, Rose's Lover
- The Thunderbolt (1912) .... The Dishonest Broker
- Cross Your Heart (1912) .... The Little Boy Grown Up
- The Ladder of Life (1912)
- Put Yourself in His Place (1912) .... Edith's Husband
- In a Garden (1912) .... Jack, as an Adult
- The Woman in White (1912) .... Sir Percival
- When Mercy Tempers Justice (1912) .... The Impoverished Father
- Miss Robinson Crusoe (1912) .... Miss Crusoe's Rescuer and Lover
- Letters of a Lifetime (1912) .... A Dying Bachelor
- But the Greatest of These Is Charity (1912) .... The Rich Father
- Undine (1912) .... Huldbrand, the Knight
- Lucile (1912) .... Lord Alfred
- Baby Hands (1912) .... The Husband
- The Finger of Scorn (1912) .... The Minister
- Nursie and the Knight (1912) .... The Father
- Pa's Medicine (1912) .... The Doctor
- Under Two Flags (1912)
- Called Back (1912) .... Gilbert Vaughn
- Whom God Hath Joined (1912) .... The Husband
- The Ring of a Spanish Grandee (1912)
- Jess (1912) .... Captain John Neil
- Love's Miracle (1912) .... The Convict/Lover
- Miss Arabella Snaith (1912) .... Harry Hargreaves, Novelist
- The Cry of the Children (1912) .... The working father
- Rejuvenation (1912) .... The Millionaire
- Into the Desert (1912) .... The Arab
- A Love of Long Ago (1912)
- The Girl of the Grove (1912)
- For Sale—A Life (1912) .... The Wealthy Young Clubman
- he Golf Caddie's Dog (1912) .... The Lover
- Flying to Fortune (1912) .... The Daughter's Sweetheart
- The Arab's Bride (1912) .... The Wealthy Moor
- On Probation (1912)
- East Lynne (1912) .... Archibald Carlyle
- Dr. Jekyll and Mr. Hyde (1912) .... Dr. Jekyll / Mr. Hyde
- She (1911) .... Leo Vincey / Kallikrates
- Brother Bob's Baby (1911) .... Bob's Brother
- Beneath the Veil (1911) .... The Artist
- A Mother's Faith (1911) .... The Errant Son
- The Last of the Mohicans (1911) .... Uncas
- The Higher Law (1911)
- A Boy of the Revolution (1911)
- Back to Nature (1911)
- The Pied Piper of Hamelin (1911)

== Bibliography ==
- Ray Starman, "James Cruze: Cinema's Forgotten Director", Films In Review (October 1985), p. 460-465
