= Karl Brown (cinematographer) =

American cinematographer, screenwriter, and film director

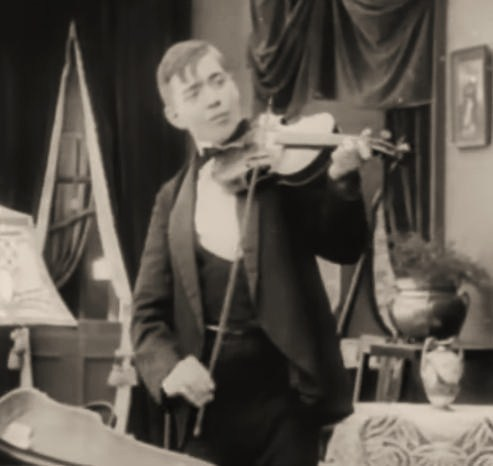
- Brown in the film Home, Sweet Home (1914)
- Born: December 26, 1896; McKeesport, Pennsylvania, U.S.
- Died: March 25, 1990 (aged 93); Woodland Hills, Los Angeles, California, U.S.
- Occupations: Cinematographer; Screenwriter; Film director
- Years active: 1914–1960
- Spouse: Edna Mae Cooper (m. 1922; died 1986)

Karl Brown (December 26, 1896 – March 25, 1990) was an American cinematographer, screenwriter, and film director. He was also a member of the American Society of Cinematographers and served as vice president from 1924 to 1925.

== Early life ==
Brown was the son of comedian and character actor William H. Brown. His mother was silent film actress Lucille Brown, who served as chaperone and guardian to actresses at the Fine Arts Studio and made some film appearances.

== Career ==
Brown's first entertainment-related job, while still in his teens, was working at a development lab for the Kinemacolor Company of America, which produced films in Kinemacolor, in Los Angeles. Brown was 17 when renowned film director D. W. Griffith and his crew came to take over the Kinemacolor Film Company in 1913. Brown got in touch with camera man G. W. Bitzer and soon after became his assistant. Brown assisted Bitzer during the filming of The Birth of a Nation (1915) and Intolerance (1916). His duties consisted of loading the camera with film, carrying the camera, and operating a second camera during the Ride of the Clan and the Fall of Babylon scenes. After the collapse of Kinemacolor, he worked as a still photographer on The Spoilers (1914), having become enamored with Griffith's work, especially The Battle at Elderbush Gulch (1913),

The most successful film Brown worked on as cinematographer was the James Cruze film The Covered Wagon (1923). Brown's first directorial effort, Stark Love (1927), is today considered a rural cinematic masterpiece.

Brown was cinematographer on Wallace Reid's last film, Thirty Days (1922). In the 1970s, Brown was one of the Hollywood pioneers interviewed by Kevin Brownlow for Brownlow's television series Hollywood (1980). In the series, Brown talked at length about Reid's addiction and death.

== Personal life ==
He was married to Edna Mae Cooper from 1922 until her death in 1986.

== Partial filmography ==
- Stage Struck (1917)
- Her Official Fathers (1917)
- Gasoline Gus (1921)
- Crazy to Marry (1921)
- Is Matrimony a Failure? (1922)
- The Dictator (1922)
- Thirty Days (1922)
- The Covered Wagon (1923)
- Hollywood (1923)
- To the Ladies (1923)
- Leap Year (1924)
- The Fighting Coward (1924)
- The Enemy Sex (1924)
- Merton of the Movies (1924)
- Welcome Home (1925)
- The Pony Express (1925)
- Beggar on Horseback (1925)
- Mannequin (1926)
- Stark Love (1927) (as director)
- The Mississippi Gambler (1929)
- Prince of Diamonds (1930)
- Flames (1932)
- In His Steps (1936)
- Federal Bullets (1937)
- Under the Big Top (1938) (as director)
- Numbered Woman (1938) (as director)
- The Man They Could Not Hang (1939) (screenplay)
