= Walter Woods (screenwriter) =

American screenwriter

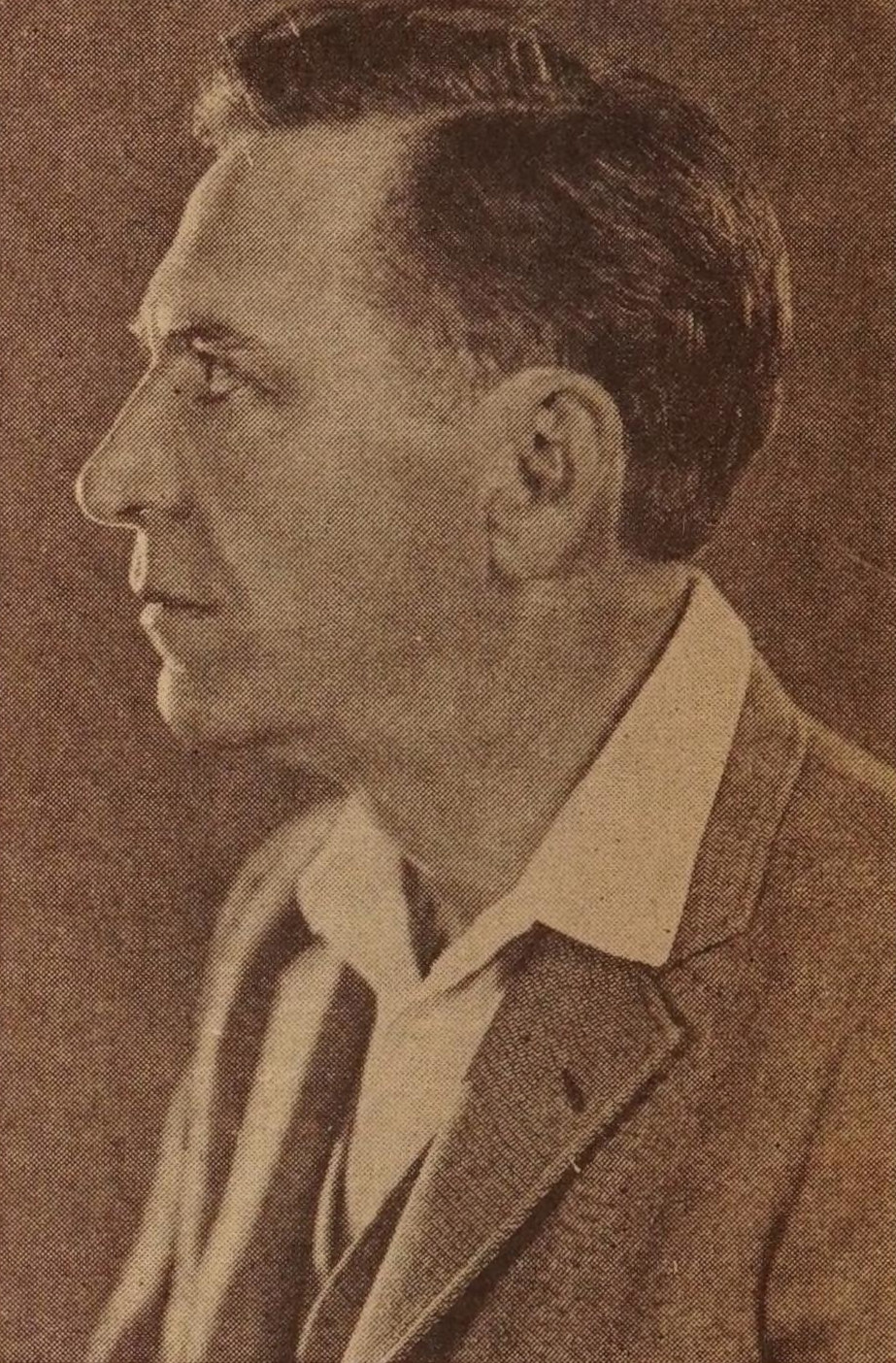
- Born: January 14, 1881; Erie, Pennsylvania, USA
- Died: December 7, 1942 (aged 61); Glendale, California, USA
- Years active: 1915-1938

Walter Woods (January 14, 1881 – December 7, 1942) was an American screenwriter of the silent era. He wrote for 76 films between 1915 and 1938. He was born in Erie, Pennsylvania and died in Glendale, California.

== Selected filmography ==
- Graft (1915)
- Undine (1916)
- Behind the Lines (1916)
- The Book Agent (1917)
- Even As You and I (1917)
- The Flame of Youth (1917)
- The Brass Bullet (1918)
- Smashing Through (1918)
- The Grim Game (1919)
- Hawthorne of the U.S.A. (1919)
- Terror Island (1920)
- The City of Masks (1920)
- Life of the Party (1920)
- Leap Year (1921)
- Brewster's Millions (1921)
- The Dollar-a-Year Man (1921)
- Travelling Salesman (1921)
- Gasoline Gus (1921)
- Crazy to Marry (1921)
- Thirty Days (1922) last film of Wallace Reid
- The Enemy Sex (1924)
- Reckless Romance (1924)
- The City That Never Sleeps (1924)
- Welcome Home (1925)
- The Pony Express (1925)
- Old Ironsides (1926)
- Stark Love (1927)
- The Night Flyer (1928)
- The Voice of the Storm (1929)
- The Big Fight (1930)
