= Beggars of Life =

1928 film by William A. Wellman

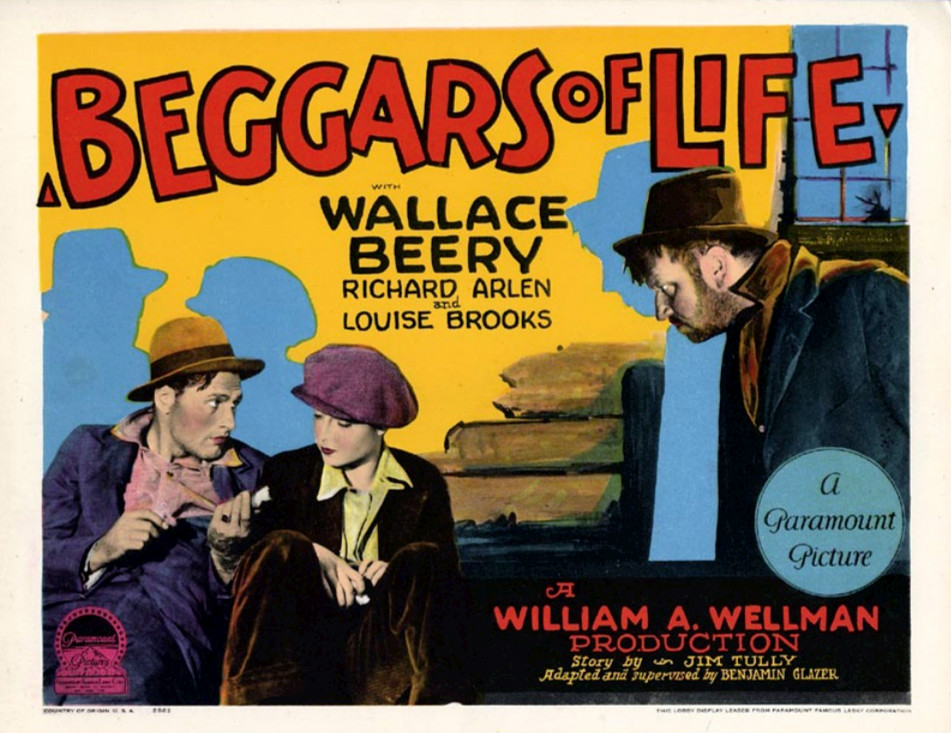
- 1928 lobby card
- Directed by: William A. Wellman
- Written by: Jim Tully (autobiography); Maxwell Anderson (play); Benjamin Glazer (screenplay)
- Produced by: Jesse L. Lasky; Adolph Zukor
- Starring: Wallace Beery; Louise Brooks; Richard Arlen
- Cinematography: Henry W. Gerrard
- Edited by: Alyson Shaffer
- Music by: Karl Hajos
- Distributed by: Paramount Pictures
- Release date: September 22, 1928
- Running time: 74 minutes (9 reels)
- Country: United States
- Languages: Sound (Part-Talkie); English Intertitles

Beggars of Life is a 1928 American part-talkie sound film that was directed by William Wellman. The film stars Wallace Beery and Richard Arlen as homeless men, and Louise Brooks as a young woman who dresses as a young man and flees the law.

Although the film featured sequences with audible dialogue, the majority of the film had a synchronized musical score with sound effects. The film was released on both sound-on-disc and sound-on-film formats. Currently circulating are mute prints from the sound-on-disc version. The majority of the sound discs (except for the first reel) are believed to be lost.

Brooks recounted her memories of working on the film in her 1982 book, Lulu in Hollywood. The film is regarded as Brooks's best American movie.

== Plot ==
Nancy is a teenage orphan living with an abusive foster father. One day Nancy kills him accidentally while resisting an attack. Jim, a young drifter and hobo, stumbles upon the murder scene. Though initially reluctant, Jim agrees to help Nancy escape. She disguises herself as a boy to escape notice.

Nancy and Jim hop a freight train, but the brakeman discovers them and physically throws them off, injuring Nancy. The pair finds refuge in a homeless camp. Two men, Arkansaw Snake and Oklahoma Red, are rivals for control of the camp.

Snake quickly suspects Nancy is a girl. Jim shows the group a police handbill with her photograph, showing the camp that she is wanted for murder. He warns the men not to touch her. Snake wants Jim and Nancy to leave the camp, but Red overrules him, allowing the pair to remain.

A police raid breaks up the homeless camp, causing the residents to scatter. Jim, Nancy, Snake, Red and several others—including Black Mose, a gentle giant, and Lame Hoppy, a sick man —hop a train. While in the boxcar, Red tries to dispose of Jim, seeing him as a rival. However, Nancy intervenes and sparks fight between Red and Snake. In the melee, Jim seizes Red's revolver and holds him off. When the train stops, the police arrive to force everyone out of the boxcar.

Jim, Nancy, Mose, and Hoppy take refuge in a remote shack. Red appears at the shack in car, bearing women's clothing. Nancy changes from the boy's clothing and she and Jim flee in the car. Back at the shack, Hoppy dies. Red dresses Hoppy's corpse in Nancy's discarded garments, hides the body in a lumber car, and sets it aflame. When detectives arrive at the shack, they assume Nancy is dead. Having saved Nancy and Jim, Red dies in a final act of sacrifice. As the story ends, Nancy and Jim ride atop a moving Pullman car, headed toward Canada and freedom.

== Cast ==
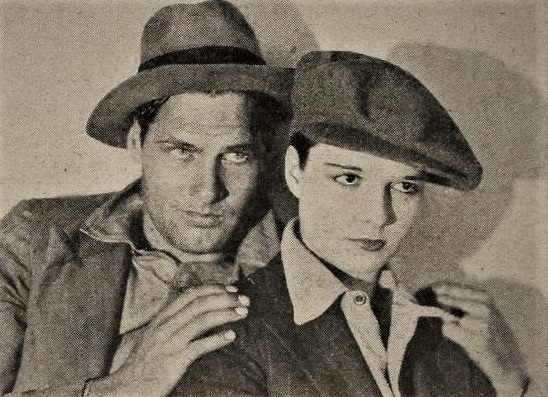
Richard Arlen and Louise Brooks

- Wallace Beery as Oklahoma Red
- Louise Brooks as The Girl (Nancy)
- Richard Arlen as The Boy (Jim)
- Robert (Bob) Perry as The Arkansaw Snake
- Blue Washington as Black Mose
- Roscoe Karns as Lame Hoppy
- Robert Brower as Blind Sims (uncredited)
- Frank Brownlee as the Farmer (uncredited)
- Jacques (Jack) Chapin as Ukie (uncredited)
- Andy Clark as Skelly (uncredited)
- Mike Donlin as Bill (uncredited)
- George Kotsonaros as Baldy (uncredited)
- Kewpie Morgan as Skinny (uncredited)
- Guinn "Big Boy" Williams as Baker's Cart Driver (uncredited)

== Music ==
The film features a theme song entitled "Beggars of Life" which was composed by J. Keirn Brennan and Karl Hajos.

== Overview ==
Beggars of Life (1928)

Beggars of Life was released as a sound film with a few talking sequences in September 1928. The majority of the film featured synchronized music and sound effects. The sound discs (with the exception of the first out of nine reels), which included recordings of train noises and of Beery singing a song, are now considered lost. This was Paramount's second feature with spoken dialogue and the first time Beery's voice was recorded for a film, although Beery's spoken dialogue was limited. Today, only the mute print version of Beggars of Life is known to survive.

The film is based on Outside Looking In, a stage play by Maxwell Anderson that was adapted from Jim Tully’s 1924 autobiographical book, Beggars of Life. The play debuted on September 7, 1925 at the Greenwich Village Theater in New York City. The premiere was attended by Charlie Chaplin, accompanied by Brooks. Paramount purchased the rights to Tully's book and Anderson's play in early 1928.

Arlen and Brooks had appeared together the previous year in Rolled Stockings, which is considered a lost film. Beery and Brooks had appeared together the previous year in Now We're in the Air, which was considered a lost film until 2016 when an incomplete copy was found in Czech Republic.

In 2017, the best surviving copy of Beggars of Life was released on DVD and Blu-ray by Kino Lorber. Commentaries on the Kino release are by William Wellman Jr. and Thomas Gladysz.

== Critical reception ==
Film critic Richard Brody wrote,

"Brooks looks right at home in a man's suit; Wellman makes good sport of her incongruity in a woman's finery; he has an eye for the physical and moral degradation of the persecuted and the despised; though the sentimental spark of love may conquer all, Wellman leaves a sour air of disgust on the dusty trail."

Critic Neil Brand said the

"film is astonishing on several fronts, not least in appearing to be Depression-era before the Depression, life on the road being depicted with an eye for detail and a harsh flat realism, and its view of human relationships is no more romantic."

Jerry Vermilye commented that,

"Wellman was in top form directing this grimly naturalistic material, and drew exceptional performances from Arlen, Beery, and Brooks, whose natural beauty was scarcely enhanced by her costuming."

Critic Mordaunt Hall was not impressed with the film, opining that

"Tully's chronicle of tramps is a monotone effort despite the fact that people are thrown off trains and a girl shoots a man; not even Wallace Beery who has proved more than once that he can handle a role and makes the action stirring, does anything that accelerates the movement in this picture."

== See also ==
- List of early sound feature films (1926–1929)
- Miss Nobody (1926)
- Wild Boys of the Road (1933)
