= Deering Davis =

American designer, author and aviator (1897–1965)

- Born: March 9, 1897; Chicago, Illinois, U.S.
- Died: July 29, 1965 (aged 68); Los Angeles, California, U.S.
- Spouses: Louise Brooks (m. 1933; div. 1934); Etti Plesch (m. 1949; div. 1951)
- Father: Nathan Smith Davis Jr.
- Relatives: Charles Boissevain (brother-in-law); Nathan Smith Davis (grandfather); James C. Hopkins (grandfather)

William Deering Davis (March 9, 1897 – July 29, 1965) was an American designer and author who was one of the first American aviators to serve in Italy in World War I. In addition to his romantic pursuit of Chicago socialite Ginevra King, he married film star Louise Brooks and racehorse owner Etti Plesch.

== Biography ==
William Deering Davis (known by his middle name) was born in Chicago, Illinois, the son of physician Nathan Smith Davis, Jr. and Jessie B. Hopkins, who was the daughter of lawyer James C. Hopkins. During his idle youth in Lake Forest, Illinois, Davis competed with future writer F. Scott Fitzgerald for the affections of Chicago socialite Ginevra King who inspired the character of Daisy Buchanan in The Great Gatsby.

Davis graduated from the University of Chicago. Enlisting in the Aviation Section of the U.S. Signal Corps in 1917, he was sent to Italy, where he flew scouting missions. He was sent home after an accident put him in hospital in Rome for many weeks, ending his service as a war pilot.

In 1933, he married movie star Louise Brooks, but Brooks abruptly left him in March 1934 after only five months of marriage, "without a good-bye ... and leaving only a note of her intentions" behind her. According to film historian James Card, Davis was just "another elegant, well-heeled admirer", nothing more. The couple officially divorced in 1938. He later married racehorse owner Etti Plesch for two years (1949–51).

A member of the American Institute of Designers, Davis designed both interiors and furniture such as chairs and lamps, some of it influenced by styles prevalent in the southwestern United States. He wrote or coauthored books on related subjects, including the illustrated volumes Georgetown Houses of the Federal Period (1944), Alexandria Houses, 1750-1830 (1946), and Annapolis Houses: 1700-1775 (1947).

Davis was also a polo player and wrote an illustrated guidebook, The American Cow Pony: The Background, Training, Equipment and Use of the Western Horse (1962), about a small type of stock horse. It covers training and equipment and has a large bibliography.
