= Nathan Davis =

Nathan Davis may refer to:

- Nathan Davis (traveller) (1812–1882), British missionary and amateur excavator at Carthage
- Nathan Davis (actor) (1917–2008), American actor
- Nathan Davis (saxophonist) (1937–2018), American jazz saxophonist
- Nathan Davis (gridiron football) (born 1974), defensive lineman
- Nathan Smith Davis (1817–1904), physician instrumental in founding Northwestern University
- Nathan Smith Davis Jr. (1858–1920), physician and dean of Northwestern University Medical College
- Nathan Davis (basketball) (born 1974), American college basketball coach
- Nathan Davis (rugby league) (born 1995), Australian rugby league player
- Nathan Davis (ice hockey) (born 1986), American ice hockey coach and player

== See also ==
- Nate Davis (disambiguation)
- Nathaniel Davis (disambiguation)
