= Jim Tully =

American writer (1886–1947)

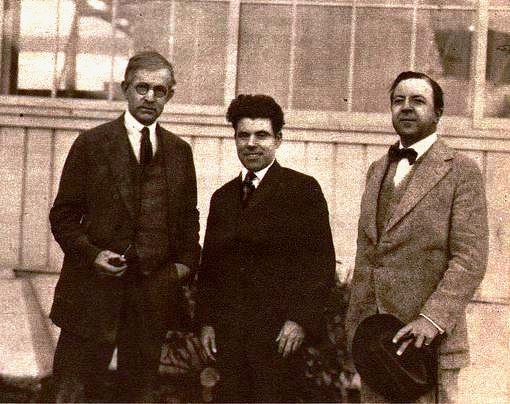
- Eugene Manlove Rhodes, Jim Tully, and Rupert Hughes in 1922
- Born: June 3, 1886
- Died: June 22, 1947 (aged 61)
- Spouses: Florence May Bushnell (m. 1910; div. 1921); Margaret Rider Myers (m. 1925; div. 1930); Myrtle Zwetow (m. 1933)
- Writing career
- Period: 1922–1943
- Subjects: Hollywood; American underclass; boxing

Jim Tully (June 3, 1886 – June 22, 1947) was an American vagabond, pugilist, and writer. He enjoyed critical and commercial success as a writer in the 1920s and 1930s.

== Biography ==
Born near St. Marys, Ohio, to James Dennis and Bridget Marie Lawler Tully, an Irish immigrant ditch-digger and his wife, Tully enjoyed a relatively happy but impoverished childhood until the death of his mother in 1892. Unable to care for him, his father sent him to an orphanage in Cincinnati. He remained there for six years. What further education he acquired came in the hobo camps, boxcars, railroad yards, and public libraries scattered across the country. Finally, weary of the road, he arrived in Kent, Ohio, where he worked as a chain maker, professional boxer, and tree surgeon. He also began to write, mostly poetry published in the local newspapers.

He moved to Hollywood in 1912, when he began writing in earnest. His literary career took two distinct paths. He became one of the first reporters to cover Hollywood. As a free-lancer he was not constrained by the studios and wrote about Hollywood celebrities (including Charlie Chaplin, for whom he had worked) in ways that they did not always find agreeable. For these pieces, rather tame by current standards, he became known as the most-hated man in Hollywood—a title he relished. Less lucrative but closer to his heart were the books he wrote about his life on the road and the American underclass. He also wrote an affectionate memoir of his childhood with his extended Irish family, as well as novels on prostitution, boxing, Hollywood, and a travel book. While some of the more graphic books ran afoul of the censors, they also garnered both commercial success and critical acclaim from, among others, H. L. Mencken, George Jean Nathan, and Rupert Hughes, who wrote that Tully "has fathered the school of hard-boiled writing so zealously cultivated by Ernest Hemingway and lesser luminaries."

Beggars of Life, a silent film starring Louise Brooks based on Tully's memoir of the same name and its play adaptation, Outside Looking In, by Maxwell Anderson, was released in 1928.

== Marriage and children ==
Tully married Florence May Bushnell on October 14, 1910, in Kent, Ohio. They had two children together: T. Alton Tully, born August 3, 1911, in Kent and daughter Trilby Jean Tully born November 13, 1918, in California. Tully later had two additional marriages, to Marna, Margaret Rider Myers in 1925, and finally to Myrtle Zwetow on June 28, 1933, in Ventura, California.

== Works ==
=== Autobiography ===
- Beggars of Life (1924) (New York: Albert & Charles Boni)
- Circus Parade (1927) (New York: Albert & Charles Boni)
- A Man of the New School (1931) (Cincinnati: Greater Hotel Gibson in Cincinnati)

=== Novels ===
- Emmett Lawler (1922) (New York: Harcourt, Brace and Company, Inc.)
- Jarnegan (1926) (New York: Albert & Charles Boni)
- Shanty Irish (1928) (New York: Albert & Charles Boni)
- Shadows of Men (1930) (New York: Doubleday, Doran and Company)
- Blood on the Moon (1931) (New York: Coward-McCann, Inc.)
- Laughter in Hell (1932) (New York: Albert & Charles Boni)
- Ladies in the Parlor (1935) (New York: Greenberg: Publisher)
- The Bruiser (1936) (New York: Greenberg: Publisher)
- Biddy Brogan’s Boy (1942) (New York: Charles Scribner's Sons)

=== Travel ===
- Beggars Abroad (1930) (New York: Doubleday, Doran and Company)

=== Story Collections ===
- Many Lies Were Told... Collected Stories (2021) (Baltimore: Underworld Amusements)

=== Profiles ===
- A Dozen and One (1943) (Hollywood: Murray & Gee). CONTENTS: Introduction / Damon Runyon. -- Charlie Chaplin—Clark Gable—Jack Dempsey—Diego Rivera—George Jean Nathan—Wilson Mizner—Jim Cruze—Arnold Bennett—Tod Sloan—Paul Bern—Walter Winchell—Henry Armstrong—H.L. Mencken.

=== Plays ===
- Black Boy w/ Frank Dazey (1926) play
- Twenty Below w/ Robert Nichols (1927) play (London: Robert Holden & Co. Ltd.)

=== Articles ===
- "Are Americans People?" The Story World and Photodramatist, May 1923.
- "Speaking of Men—! Bill Hart, Sid Grauman & Sig Haugdahl," Triple-X Magazine, October 1924.
- "Whales to Starboard!" Triple-X Magazine, January 1925.
- "The Three Gamblers," Photoplay, January 1925.
- "The Man Who Found Himself," Photoplay, February 1925.
- "On the Banks of the Wabash," Photoplay, May 1925.
- "The Extra Pirate," Photoplay, August 1925.
- "The Girl with the Broken Ankle," Photoplay, August 1925.
- "Can Dempsey Still Fight?" Liberty, August 22, 1925.
- "The Lad Who Ran Away," Photoplay, September 1925.
- "The Girl Who Kept Step," Photoplay, January 1926.
- "A Top Rider," Photoplay, January 1926.
- "Passing Strangers," Liberty, September 11, 1926.
- "Owen, Tom, Matt and Joe," Photoplay, October 1925.
- "A Modern Samaritan," Photoplay, November 1925.
- "Writers I Have Known," Markets and Methods for Writers, April 1927.
- "Aimee Semple McPherson," Liberty, January 12, 1929.
- "The Failure of Jack London," Markets and Methods for Writers, March 1929.
- "Two Thousand Rejection Slips," Markets and Methods for Writers, March 1930.
- "My Writing Creed," Writer’s 1931 Year Book.
- "Ex-Follies Girl," The Illustrated Love Magazine, March 1932.
- "The Girl Who Lied," The Illustrated Love Magazine, August 1932.
- "The Clown Who Juggled Apples" (W. C. Fields), Photoplay, January 1934.
- "Warner Baxter—And Women," Movie Classic, January 1936.
- "Today’s Greatest Prizefighter," Liberty, April 2, 1938.
- "The Bruiser," Jack Dempsey’s Sports Magazine, May 1938.

=== Poetry ===
- "The Dying Hobo," Esquire, April 1937.
