= Nathaniel Davis (disambiguation) =

Nathaniel Davis (1925–2011) was U.S. Assistant Secretary of State for African Affairs, 1975; U.S. Ambassador to Chile, 1971–1973.

Nathaniel Davis may also refer to:

- Nathaniel P. Davis (1895–1973), U.S. Ambassador to Costa Rica, 1948–1949, United States Ambassador to Hungary, 1949–1951
- Nathaniel Newnham Davis (bishop) (1903–1966), bishop
- Nathaniel Newnham-Davis (journalist) (1854–1917), lieutenant-colonel
- Nathaniel Cleophas Davis (1888–1972), African American musician, composer and educator

== See also ==
- Nathan Davis (disambiguation)
- Nate Davis (disambiguation)
