= Prix de beauté =

1930 film directed by Augusto Genina

Miss Europe
- original French film poster
- Directed by: Augusto Genina
- Written by: René Clair; G. W. Pabst
- Produced by: G. W. Pabst; Augusto Genina
- Starring: Louise Brooks; Georges Charlia; Augusto Bandini
- Music by: Wolfgang Zeller (sound version, 1930)
- Release date: 1 August 1930 (France)
- Running time: 93 min. (France, US); 108 min. (Germany)
- Country: France
- Language: French

Prix de Beauté ("Beauty Prize", UK title: Miss Europe) is a 1930 film directed by Augusto Genina. The film is notable for being the first sound film made by star Louise Brooks, although all of her dialogue and singing were dubbed. This film is an early example of sound film in France, along with L'Age d'Or and Under the Roofs of Paris.

== Plot ==
Prix de beauté (1930)

Despite knowing of her jealous fiancé Andre's strong contempt for beauty contests, typist Lucienne "Lulu" Garnier (along with many other hopefuls) mails two photographs of herself to enter the Miss France contest sponsored by the Globe newspaper. Upon further consideration, she tries to withdraw, but it is too late: she has already been chosen as a finalist. When she wins, she has to travel to Spain immediately to compete for the crown of Miss Europe without having an opportunity to break the news to Andre. When he finds out, he rushes to the train station too late.

Lucienne is selected by audience applause to be Miss Europe. She attracts numerous ardent admirers, among them a maharajah and Prince Adolphe de Grabovsky. Andre shows up and gives her an ultimatum: return to France with him within the hour or they are through. She is torn, but chooses him.

However, she is miserable in their apartment. When Grabovsky tracks her down to offer her a film contract with Sound Films International, she tears up the contract, but later that night, reconsiders and sneaks away to accept, leaving only a letter of explanation for Andre.

She makes a short film, which the studio executives decide to premiere. By chance, newspaper worker Andre is given the item to typeset. He goes to see Lucienne, but is told that she is viewing the film and cannot be disturbed. He sneaks in anyway and shoots her as she watches herself on screen, killing her instantly. Andre drops the gun and makes no resistance when apprehended. The film shows Lucienne singing a song about a woman imploring her lover not to be jealous of other men's attentions.

== Cast ==
- Louise Brooks as Lucienne Garnier
- Georges Charlia as Andre
- Augusto Bandini as Antonin, Lucienne and Andre's friend and co-worker
- Andre Nicolle as Le secretaire du journal, to whom Lucienne appeals to try to withdraw from the contest
- Marc Ziboulsky as Le manager
- Yves Glad as Le maharajah
- Alex Bernard as Le photographe, who takes a picture of Lucienne and Andre before her fame
- Gaston Jacquet as Le Duc
- Jean Bradin as Prince de Grabovsky

== Production ==
The original drafts of the screenplay was written by René Clair; however, because of a dispute between Clair and La Sociétédes Films Artistiques (SOFAR), the script was given to the Italian director Augusto Genina. Prix de beauté was shot in and around Paris between August 29 and September 27, 1929, including at the Studios Joinville, Joinville-le-pont, Val-de-Marne. The scenes of the Miss Europe beauty pageant (an actual event held in San Sebastian, Spain) were filmed in Paris at the Jardin d’ Acclimatation, where thousands of spectators had gathered.

== Preservation status ==
The unsynchronized sound version has been in circulation for many years. However, on 18 July 2013, the San Francisco Silent Film Festival presented a restoration of the original silent version completed by the Cineteca di Bologna.
