= Now We're in the Air =

1927 film

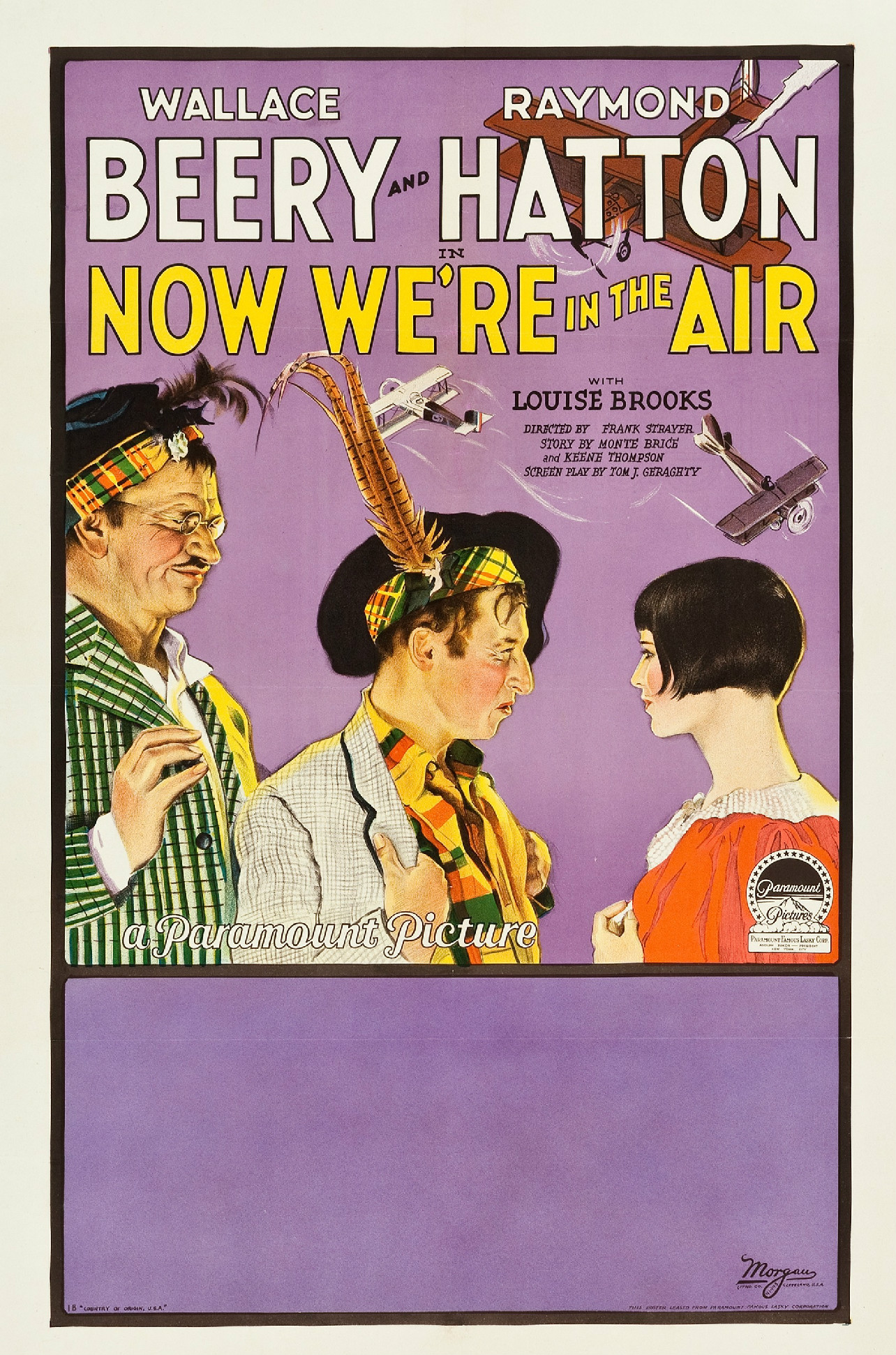
- Theatrical release poster
- Directed by: Frank R. Strayer
- Written by: Monte Brice; Keene Thompson; Thomas J. Geraghty
- Produced by: Adolph Zukor; Jesse L. Lasky
- Starring: Wallace Beery; Raymond Hatton; Louise Brooks
- Cinematography: Harry Perry
- Music by: James C. Bradford (music compiler) (uncredited)
- Production company: Paramount Pictures
- Distributed by: Paramount Pictures
- Release date: October 22, 1927
- Running time: 60 minutes
- Country: United States
- Language: Silent (English intertitles)

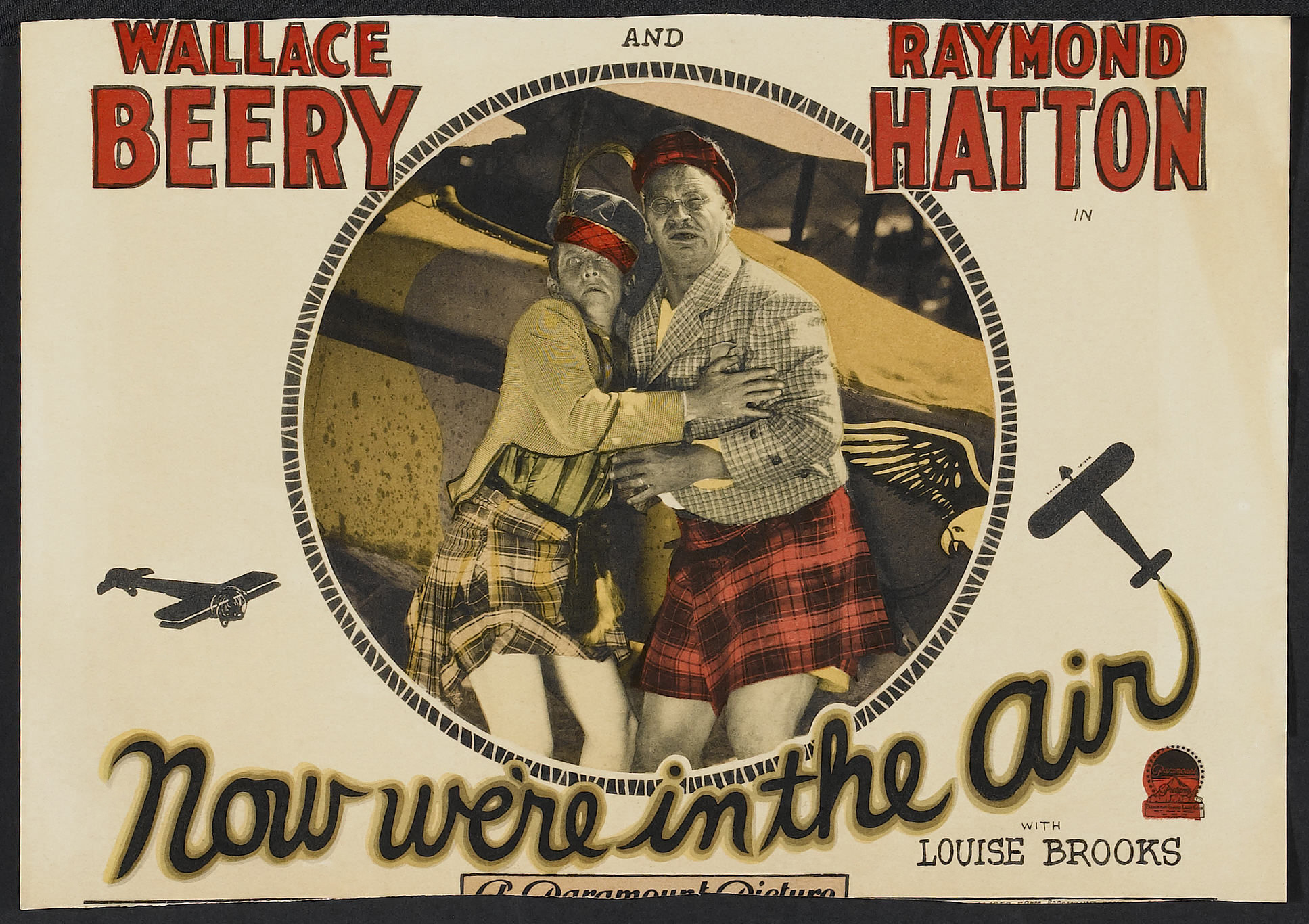
Lobby card with Beery at right

Now We're in the Air is a 1927 American silent comedy film directed by Frank R. Strayer, starring the late-1920s intermittent comedy team of Wallace Beery and Raymond Hatton. In a supporting role, Louise Brooks plays twins, one raised French and the other raised German.

Wallace Beery and Louise Brooks worked together the following year in the taut drama Beggars of Life, a well-received early sound film. Hatton also sometimes appeared paired in films with Beery's older brother Noah Beery.

== Plot ==
Surviving footage from Now We're in the Air

Wally and Ray are cousins. Their grandfather, Lord Abercrombie McTavish, is a wealthy aviation enthusiast who had wanted to enlist as a pilot for the United States Army Air Service during World War I, but was rejected, The boys are eager to impress McTavish so they can get his inheritance.

Wally and Ray enlist in the Air Service and are caught up in the aerial battles over the front lines in France. By mistake, Wally and Ray fly over the front lines in a runaway balloon. When the balloon touches down in German territory, the German troops think they are defectors and praise them as heroes. While there, Wally and Ray fall in love with twin French sisters, Grisette and Griselle (both played by Louise Brooks). One sister is loyal to the French, the other to the Germans.

The Germans send Wally and Ray over the front lines of the American Expeditionary Force to spy for Germany. They are captured and almost shot by American troops, but after convincing everyone that they were loyal Americans, the film ends on a happy note.

== Cast ==
- Wallace Beery as Wally
- Raymond Hatton as Ray
- Russell Simpson as Lord Abercrombie McTavish
- Louise Brooks as Griselle and as Grisette
- Emile Chautard as Monsieur Chelaine
- Malcolm Waite as Prof. Saenger
- Duke Martin as Top Sargeant
- Richard Alexander as German officer (uncredited)
- Theodore von Eltz as German officer (uncredited)
- Fred Kohler (uncredited)
- Charles Stevens as Knife Thrower (uncredited)
- Mattie Witting as Madame Chelaine, mother of the twins (uncredited)

== Production ==
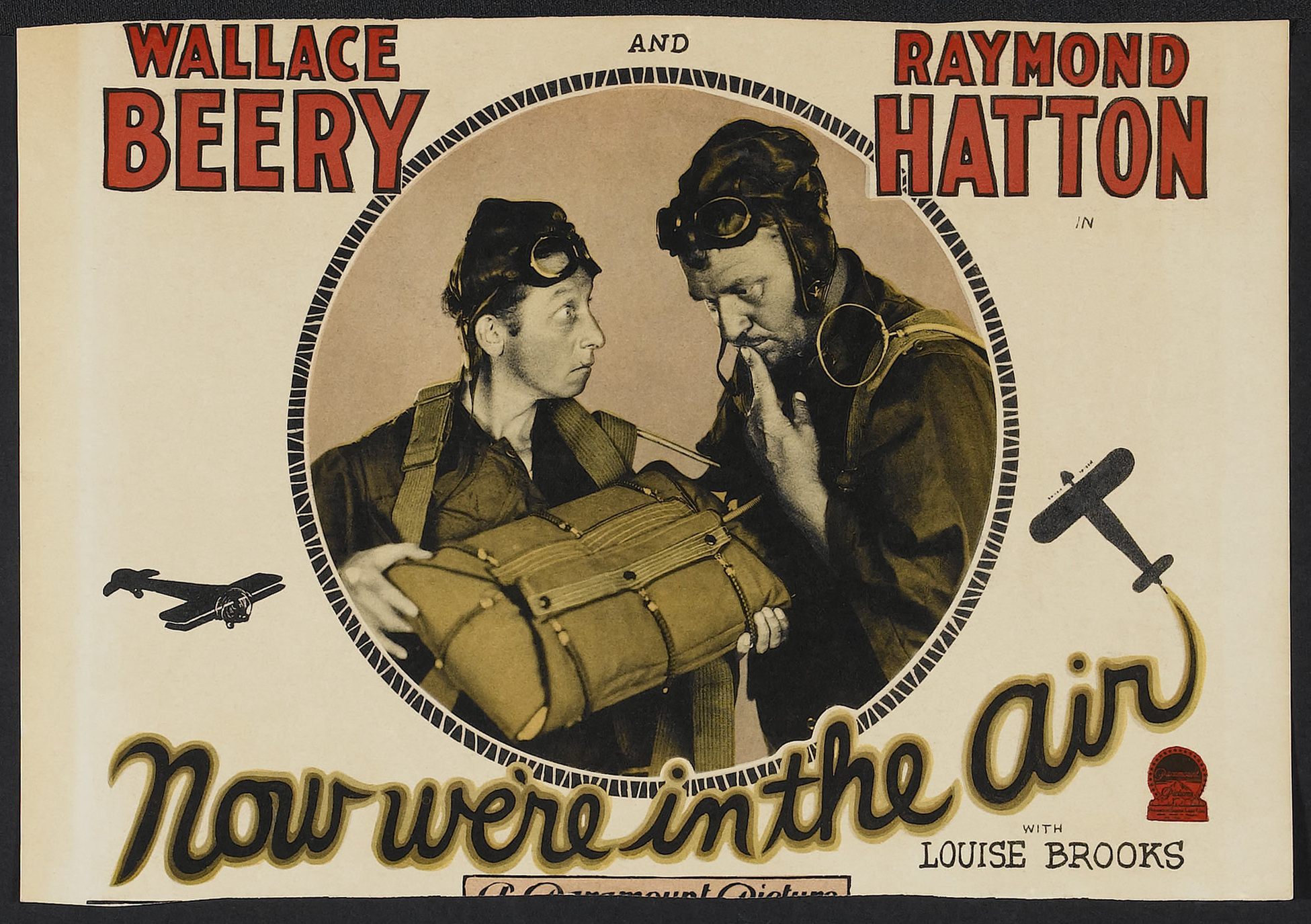
Beery (right) and Hatton

With the working title of We're Up in the Air Now , Now We're in the Air was the third in a series of war comedies starring Wallace Beery and Raymond Hatton. It followed the popular Behind the Front and We're in the Navy Now (both released in 1926).

Most of the footage in Now We're in the Air features Beery and Hatton creating mayhem around a World War I airfield. Along with original aerial scenes, aerial battle footage from the film Wings (1927) was intercut into the action. Frank Tomick was hired as the stunt pilot to create additional scenes. He operated out of Griffith Park Aerodrome, which Paramount leased along with the California National Guard Curtiss JN-4 "Jennies" stationed there. (Note: Tomick tricked a camera operator who wanted a parachute by giving him one that was packed with a "pillow".)

== Reception ==
Now We're in the Air was widely reviewed and performed well at the box office across the United States. At a time when most new releases played only one week, it enjoyed an extended run in New York City and ran for a month in San Francisco. It also opened simultaneously in five theaters in Boston, where one reviewer wrote that the audience “was so moved by mirth that they were close to tears.” Writing in the New York American, critic Regina Canon stated

“Miss Brooks is the brightest spot in Now We’re in the Air, for she may be always depended upon to be interesting, trig and snappy.”

Now We're in the Air was popular in its time, although not as well received as the earlier military farces from the Beery/Hatton team. In a modern re-appraisal, however, reviewer Janiss Garza commented:

"In spite of a dual role, Brooks doesn't have much to do; Moving Picture World felt that 'any intelligent extra girl' could have handled the part."

== Preservation: 23 Minutes ==
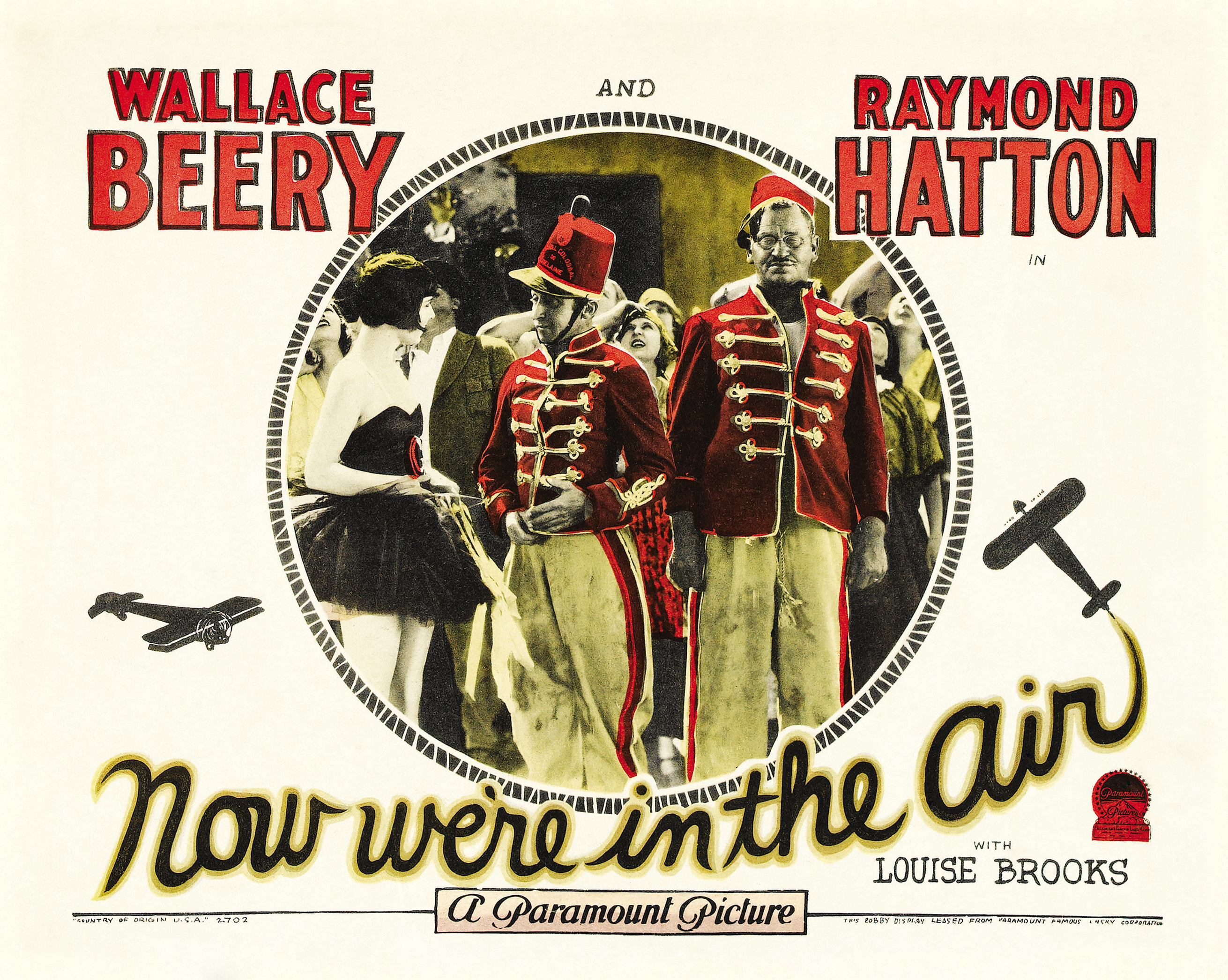
Louise Brooks (in black tutu), Raymond Hatton and Wallace Beery

Now We're in the Air was long believed to be a lost film. Three fragments were discovered in 2016 in a Czech archive: most of the surviving material was incomplete and badly deteriorated. However, approximately 23 minutes of the original six-reel film was able to be preserved to the point of crystalline clarity, including a lengthy sequence in which Louise Brooks wears a black tutu. The print was found in Prague at the Národní filmový archiv (the Czech Republic's National Film Archive) by film preservationist Robert Byrne.

"When Byrne inspected the elements for Rif a Raf, piloti (the Czech title for Now We’re in the Air), he found the film had only partially survived in a state which also showed nitrate decomposition. Additionally, the surviving scenes were found to be out of order, and there were Czech-language titles in place of the original American titles. Byrne spent more than eight months reconstructing the surviving material, including restoring the film’s original English-language intertitles and original tinting."

The preserved print of the restored fragment of Now We're in the Air was shown at the San Francisco Silent Film Festival on June 2, 2017. In 2026, Flicker Alley released Focus on Louise Brooks. It contained all surviving sequences from Now We're in the Air.

== See also ==
- List of incomplete or partially lost films
