= Memories of Berlin: The Twilight of Weimar Culture =

- Directed by: Gary Conklin
- Produced by: Gary Conklin
- Starring: Louise Brooks; Gary Conklin; Christopher Isherwood
- Cinematography: Gary Conklin
- Edited by: Gary Conklin
- Release date: 1976
- Running time: 72 minutes
- Countries: United States; Canada
- Language: English

Memories of Berlin: The Twilight of Weimar Culture is a documentary film produced and directed by Gary Conklin, and released in 1976.

The film tells the cultural story of Berlin during the Weimar Republic through interviews with a number of persons who were involved in literature, film, art, and music during the period. It includes interviews with Christopher Isherwood, Louise Brooks, Lotte Eisner, Elisabeth Bergner, Francis Lederer, Carl Zuckmayer, Gregor Piatigorsky, Claudio Arrau, Rudolf Kolisch, Mischa Spoliansky, Herbert Bayer, Mrs. Walter Gropius, and Arthur Koestler.
