= Nate Davis =

Nate Davis may refer to:

- Nate Davis (quarterback) (born 1987), American football quarterback
- Nate Davis (offensive lineman) (born 1996), American football offensive lineman
- Nathan Davis (gridiron football) (born 1974), American football defensive tackle

== See also ==
- Nathan Davis (disambiguation)
- Nathaniel Davis (disambiguation)
