= Gore Vidal: The Man Who Said No =

- Directed by: Gary Conklin
- Produced by: Gary Conklin
- Starring: Gore Vidal; Jerry Brown
- Edited by: Gary Conklin
- Release date: 1983
- Country: United States
- Language: English

Gore Vidal: The Man Who Said No (1983) is a documentary film directed, produced, and edited by Gary Conklin. The film follows famed American writer and political gadfly Gore Vidal in his quixotic campaign against incumbent California Governor Jerry Brown for the Democratic nomination for the United States Senate in 1982. Vidal and State Sen. Paul B. Carpenter each won the support of 15.1% of voters in the primary election, but were easily outdistanced by Brown, who racked up 50.7% of the vote.

== See also ==
- United States Senate election in California, 1982
