= Gary Conklin =

American filmmaker (1931 or 1932 – 2024)

- Born: December 23, 1932; Fresno, California, U.S.
- Died: December 26, 2024 (aged 92)
- Occupations: Film director and producer

Gary Conklin (December 23, 1932 – December 26, 2024) was an American independent filmmaker based in Los Angeles, California.

== Life and career ==
Conklin worked predominantly in the documentary genre. His films focussed on cultural icons of the 20th century. Subjects included the late American writer and composer Paul Bowles, in Paul Bowles in Morocco, which is as much about the North African country as it is about Bowles; Gore Vidal while running for U.S. Senate in 1982; the American painter Edward Ruscha, and the Mexican painter Rufino Tamayo.

Conklin produced and directed Memories of Berlin: The Twilight of Weimar Culture. The film features interviews with Christopher Isherwood, Louise Brooks, and Arthur Koestler, among others, discussing the culturally significant period of the 1920s in Berlin, during the Weimar Republic. He also has produced and directed a documentary about English literary society during the period after World War I until World War II, which includes Stephen Spender, Anthony Powell, Harold Acton, James Lees-Milne, Peter Quennell, Christopher Isherwood, and Diana Mosley. Conklin also made Notes from Under the Volcano about John Huston's making of the film Under the Volcano.

Conklin died on December 26, 2024, at the age of 92.

== Filmography ==
As Producer & Director:

- Paul Bowles in Morocco (1970)
- Rufino Tamayo: The Sources of his Art (1972)
- Memories of Berlin: The Twilight of Weimar Culture (1976)
- L.A. Suggested by the Art of Ed Ruscha (1981)
- Gore Vidal: The Man Who Said No (1983)
- Notes from Under the Volcano (1984)
- A Question of Class (1992)
- Veracruz, El Espíritu Jarocho (1998)
