= James Card =

American art historian (1915–2000)

- Born: October 25, 1915; Shaker Heights, Ohio, U.S.
- Died: January 16, 2000 (aged 84); Syracuse, New York, U.S.
- Education: Case Western Reserve University
- Scientific career
- Fields: Film preservation, film archiving, film history. cinephilia
- Workplaces: George Eastman House, International Museum of Photography & Film

James Card (October 25, 1915 – January 16, 2000) was an American film preservationist who established the motion picture collection at George Eastman House, one of the major moving image archives in the United States.

In November 1948, Card joined the staff of the newly created George Eastman House with the initial title of "assistant to the curator", who was Beaumont Newhall. In 1955, Card discovered Louise Brooks living as a recluse in New York City and persuaded her to move to Rochester, New York, to be near the George Eastman House. From the museum's inception until his retirement in 1977, Card built the collection and gave it an international identity.
