= Nathan Smith Davis Jr. =

American physician

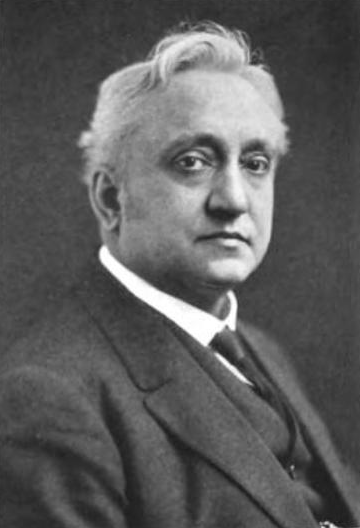
- Born: September 5, 1858; Chicago, Illinois
- Died: December 22, 1920 (aged 62); Pasadena, California
- Burial place: Rosehill Cemetery
- Education: Chicago Medical College
- Occupations: Physician, professor
- Spouse: Jessie B. Hopkins (m. 1884)
- Children: 3, including Deering Davis
- Father: Nathan Smith Davis

Nathan Smith Davis Jr. (September 5, 1858 – December 22, 1920) was an American physician and professor. The son of prominent physician and professor Nathan Smith Davis, the younger Davis followed his father into the medical profession. He taught at Northwestern University, where he rose to become dean of the Medical College.

== Education ==
Nathan Smith Davis Jr. was born September 5, 1858, in Chicago, Illinois. He was the son of Nathan Smith Davis, a founder of Northwestern University. The younger Davis attended that university, graduating in 1880 with a B.A. degree and then earning a master's degree. He studied medicine under his father in Chicago, graduating from the Chicago Medical College in 1883.

== Medical career ==
Davis opened a medical office in Chicago. In 1884, he was named an Associate Professor of Pathology at Northwestern University. Two years later, he was promoted to Professor of the Principles and Practice of Medicine and Professor of Clinical Medicine. In 1901, he was named Dean of the Northwestern University Medical College. He was also a trustee of Northwestern.

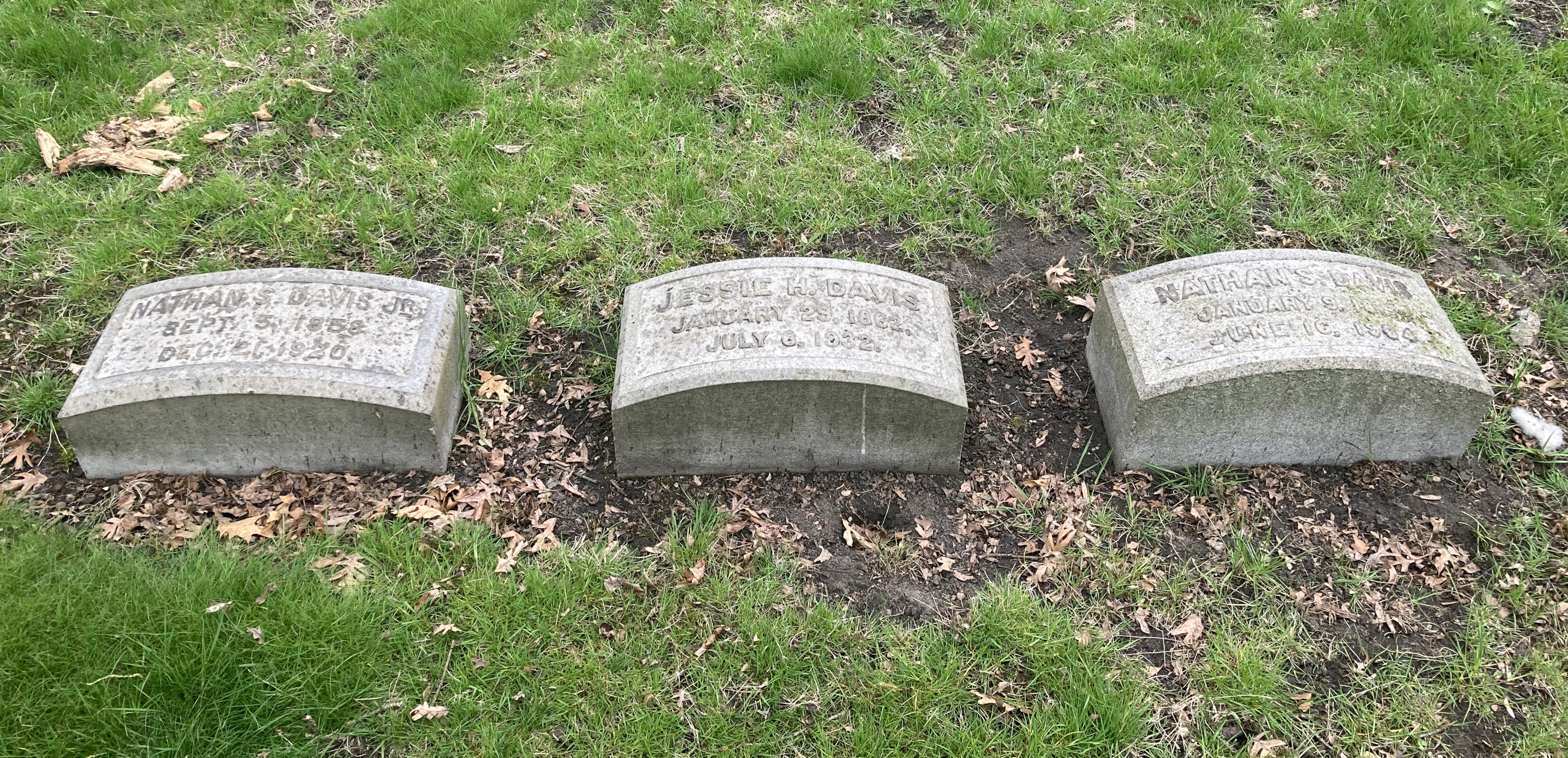
Graves of Nathan Smith Davis Jr. (left) and Sr. (right) at Rosehill Cemetery

In 1893, he was named chairman of the Section of Practice in the Illinois State Medical Society. He also served on the council and judicial council of the American Medical Association, and he served as a member of the General Board of Management of the YMCA of Chicago. Davis was a member of the Chicago Academy of Sciences, Art Institute of Chicago, and Chicago Historical Society.

Davis died on December 22, 1920, in Pasadena, California. He was buried at Rosehill Cemetery in Chicago.

== Personal life ==
Davis married Jessie B. Hopkins, the daughter of James Campbell Hopkins, in Madison, Wisconsin, on April 16, 1884. They had three children: Nathan Smith III, Ruth (who married biochemist Charles H. Boissevain), and William Deering, a designer (who was briefly married to actress Louise Brooks).

Howard Van Doren Shaw designed a house for Davis in Lake Forest, Illinois, in 1898.

== Selected publications ==
- Dietotherapy and Food in Health (1909)
- Food in Health and Disease (1912)
