= Rolled Stockings =

1927 film by Richard Rosson

- Film poster
- Directed by: Richard Rosson
- Written by: Percy Heath (scenario)
- Story by: Frederica Sagor
- Produced by: Adolph Zukor; Jesse L. Lasky; B. P. Schulberg (associate producer)
- Starring: Louise Brooks
- Cinematography: Victor Milner
- Edited by: Julian Johnson
- Distributed by: Paramount Pictures
- Release date: June 18, 1927
- Running time: 7 reels (6,249 feet)
- Country: United States
- Language: Silent (English intertitles)

Rolled Stockings is a 1927 American silent comedy film produced and distributed by Paramount Pictures, directed by Richard Rosson, and starring Louise Brooks.

== Cast ==
- James Hall as Jim Treadway
- Louise Brooks as Carol Fleming
- Richard Arlen as Ralph Treadway
- Nancy Phillips as The Vamp
- El Brendel as Rudolph
- David Torrence as Mr. Treadway
- Chance Ward as The Coach
- Sally Blane
- Dean Harrell

== Preservation ==
With no prints of Rolled Stockings located in any film archives, it is a lost film.
