= Lulu in Hollywood =

Collection of essays by Louise Brooks

- Author: Louise Brooks
- Language: English
- Publication date: 1982

Lulu in Hollywood is a collection of essays by the silent film actress Louise Brooks. First published in 1982, the book brings together seven previously published autobiographical essays, namely “Kansas to New York”, “On Location with Billy Wellman”, “Marion Davies’ Niece”, “Humphrey and Bogey”, “The Other Face of W. C. Fields”, “Gish and Garbo” and “Pabst and Lulu”.

Each of the pieces collected in Lulu in Hollywood were published in magazines and film journals beginning in the late 1950s. The copyright page states, "Portions of this book appeared in different form in Film Culture, London Magazine, Image, and Sight and Sound". The first edition includes an introduction by New Yorker editor William Shawn, an afterword, "A Witness Speaks," by film historian Lotte H. Eisner, as well as a condensed filmography and illustrations.

== Publication history ==
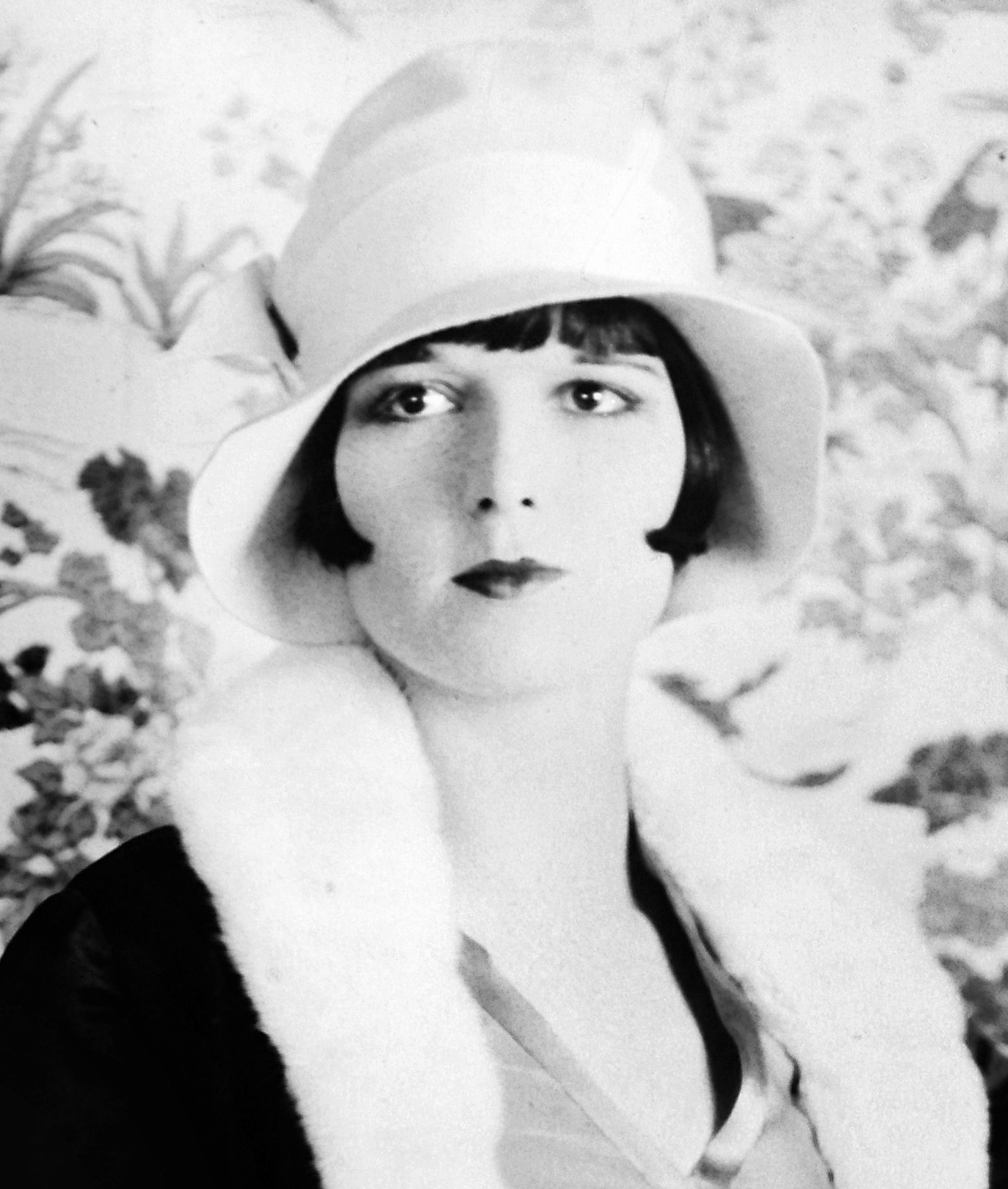
Louise Brooks

Lulu in Hollywood was first published by Alfred A. Knopf in hardback in May, 1982. The following year, Knopf issued the book in softcover. Limelight Editions reprinted the book in paperback in 1989. Lulu in Hollywood was also published in England, and in translation in France (as Louise Brooks, and later as Loulou a Hollywood), Germany (Lulu in Berlin und Hollywood), Italy (Lulu a Hollywood), The Netherlands (Loulou in Hollywood), and Spain (Lulu en Hollywood). A Japanese edition of Lulu in Hollywood, published in 1984, is radically different in its design and selection of text. The Japanese edition, titled Ruizu Burukkusu to "Ruru" (Louise Brooks to "Lulu") contains Brooks’ essays, “Gish and Garbo” and “Pabst and Lulu”, along with the filmography and images contained in Lulu in Hollywood.

In the late 1990s, Lulu in Hollywood went out-of-print in the United States. In the year 2000, aided in part by a grass-roots campaign led by the Louise Brooks Society, Lulu in Hollywood was republished in an expanded edition by the University of Minnesota Press. The University of Minnesota edition was given a new look, with redesigned front and back covers. It was expanded to include an eighth essay by Brooks, "Why I Will Never Write My Memoirs,” while Shawn's introduction was replaced by Kenneth Tynan's 1979 New Yorker profile, “The Girl in the Black Helmet”. The University of Minnesota edition was later published in Russia as Лулу в Голливуде.

In 2026, the book was issued as an e-book by the University of Minnesota Press.

== Reception ==
Lulu in Hollywood was widely and positively reviewed following its initial publication. Writing in Esquire magazine, James Wolcott described Lulu in Hollywood as "A tart, fleet, gossipy book, a whip-flicking display of wit and spite," adding "In Lulu in Hollywood, Brooks writes about her contemporaries with a darting precision and down-to-earth compassion that make the mythologizing of most movie commentators sound like so much hot wheeze. . . . Louise Brooks emerges not as a white goddess wreathed in incense, but as a sassy companion, wisecracking, knowledgeable, completely free of cant and coy sentiment."

Writing in Sight and Sound, the English critic John Russell Taylor stated, "Louise Brooks is a woman of ideas. Her writings — and this, for an actor, is really extraordinary — are about something more than just herself. She has ideas about Hollywood, she has ideas about life, and she does not necessarily confuse the two. . . . If Brooks has an Achilles heel, it is her own intelligence: she tends to attribute to others as much self-awareness and analytical power as she has herself."

Other largely positive reviews were written by William K. Everson, Herman G. Weinberg, Stanley Kauffmann, David Thomson, John Lahr, Michael Dirda, and John Updike.

One of the few negative reviews the book received was authored by Auberon Waugh, son of the novelist Evelyn Waugh. The younger Waugh wrote in the London Daily Mail that Brooks had been "hanging around" since the end of her film career in 1938. "It sounds rather a miserable life, and she sounds rather a miserable woman" Waugh noted, adding "Her book may not teach us much about the cinema, but it provides a gloomy little object lesson in sexual morals: Don't let your daughter on the stage.". One other especially negative review was written by Lawrence J. Quirk, nephew of Photoplay magazine editor James R. Quirk. Its title, "Lulu in Hollywood: A Weird Case of Media Super-Hype, Whitewash and Cover-Up Galore," speaks to the tone of his review.

"Appendix: Errata in Lulu in Hollywood" was published in the 1989 biography of the actress by Barry Paris. It points to nearly a dozen errors in Lulu in Hollywood. The appendix states: "The major and minor errors in Lulu in Hollywood cited here have been identified by Kevin Brownlow, William K. Everson, Jane Sherman Lehac, George Pratt, Lawrence Quirk, Anthony Slide, Alexander Walker, and the author, among others."

== Legacy ==
Lulu in Hollywood continues to be read and cited. In 2012, Janet Maslin wrote in the New York Times, "These eight essays are selective, nostalgic, poison-tipped and fearlessly smart. They're sharp about Hollywood's definitions of success and failure, about how actors are manipulated by their employers and pigeonholed by the press.... Brooks still shimmers as a rare loner who traveled down that road, her life in ruins -- and then came back. This book is as idiosyncratic and magnetic as its author."

In 2023, the Hollywood Reporter published an article listing the 100 best film books of all time". Lulu in Hollywood ranked number 44. In 2024, the Los Angeles Times ranked Lulu in Hollywood number 28 among its list of the 50 best Hollywood books of all time. The newspaper noted, "Brooks was best known for G.W. Pabst’s 1929 drama Pandora’s Box, in which her Lulu, a ferocious flapper with a pageboy haircut, seduced and abandoned all men who dared stand in her path. But she was also an astute observer of show business customs and personalities, and, as it turned out, a very good writer."
