= Outside Looking In (play) =

- Written by: Maxwell Anderson
- Original language: English
- Genre: Comedy
- Setting: Williston, North Dakota and Montana

Premiere
- Date premiered: September 7, 1925
- Place premiered: Greenwich Village Theatre, 39th Street Theatre; New York City, New York

Outside Looking In is a 1925 Broadway three-act comedy written by Maxwell Anderson, produced by Kenneth Macgowan, Robert Edmond Jones and Eugene O'Neill and directed by Augustin Duncan.

== Background ==
Cleon Throckmorton created the scenic design. The play was adapted from Jim Tully's autobiography Beggars of Life: A Hobo Autobiography. The show ran for 113 performances from September 7, 1925 to November 1925 at the Greenwich Village Theatre and continuing from November 1925 to December 1925 at the 39th Street Theatre. This was Jimmy Cagney's legitimate stage debut playing the hobo Little Red.

== Cast ==
- Reginald Barlow as Baldy
- Charles A. Bickford as Oklahoma Red
- James Cagney as Little Red
- Blythe Daly as Edna
- David A. Leonard as Arkansas Snake
- Harry D. Blakemore as Mose
- Raphael Byrnes as Bill
- Wallace House as Skelly
- Sidney Machat as Ukie
- Barry Macollum as Hopper
- James Martin as Rubin
- Richard Sullivan as Blind Sims
