= Louise Brooks =

American actress (1906–1985)

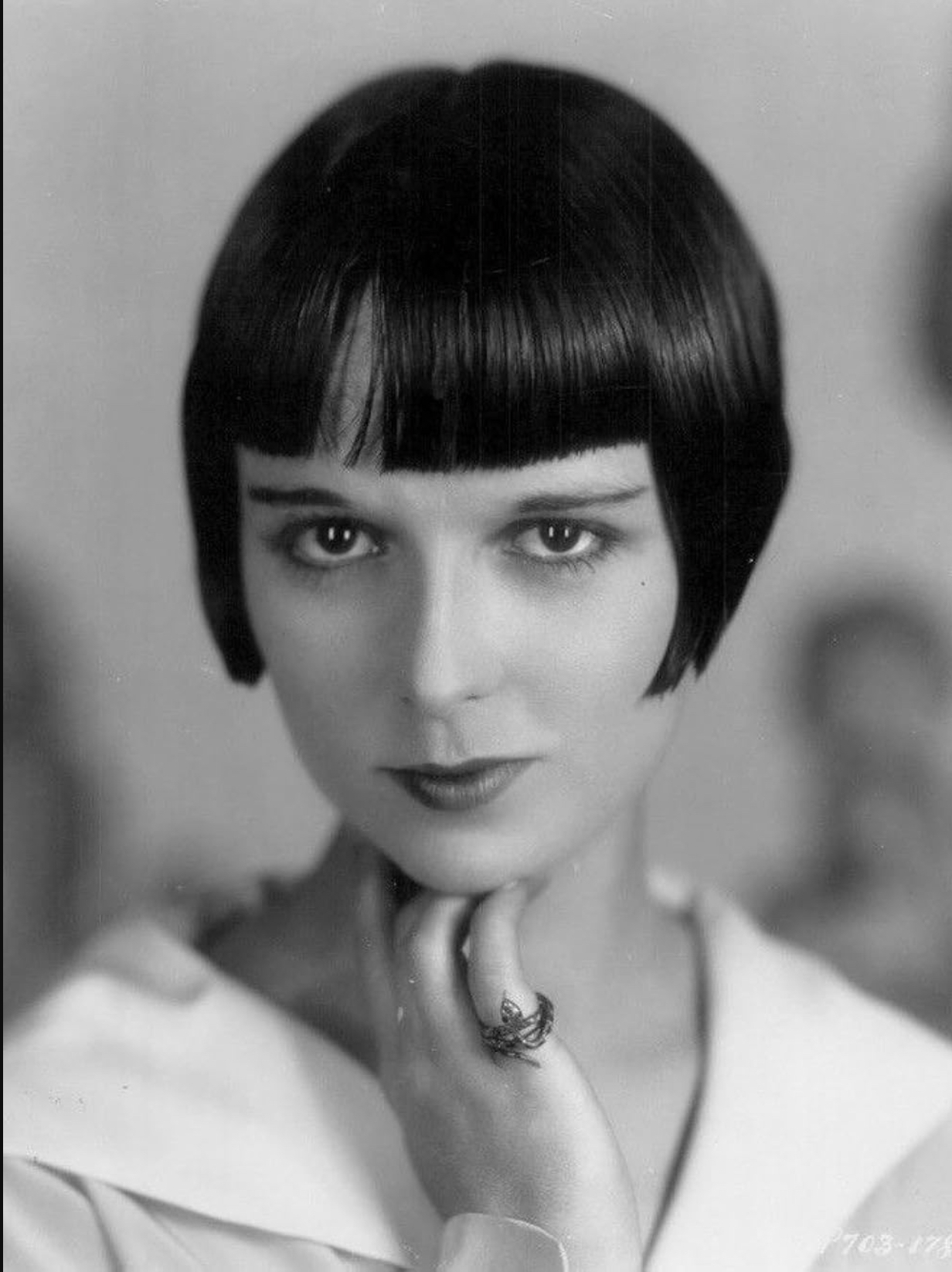
- Brooks c. 1926
- Born: Mary Louise Brooks; November 14, 1906; Cherryvale, Kansas, U.S.
- Died: August 8, 1985 (aged 78); Rochester, New York, U.S.
- Resting place: Holy Sepulchre Cemetery (Rochester, New York)
- Other names: Lulu, Brooksie, The Girl in the Black Helmet
- Occupations: Actress; dancer; writer
- Years active: 1925–1938
- Known for: Pandora's Box (1929); Diary of a Lost Girl (1929)
- Spouses: A. Edward Sutherland (m. 1926; div. 1928) Deering Davis (m. 1933; div. 1938)

Mary Louise Brooks (November 14, 1906 – August 8, 1985) was an American film actress during the 1920s and 1930s, and later an essayist. She is regarded today as an icon of the flapper culture, in part due to the bob hairstyle that she helped popularize during the prime of her career.

Aged 15, Brooks began her career as a dancer and toured with the Denishawn School of Dancing and Related Arts where she performed opposite Ted Shawn. After being fired, she found employment as a chorus girl in George White's Scandals and as a semi-nude dancer in the Ziegfeld Follies in New York City. While dancing in the Follies, Brooks came to the attention of Walter Wanger, a producer at Paramount Pictures, and signed a five-year contract with the studio. She appeared in supporting roles in various Paramount films before taking the heroine's role in Beggars of Life (1928). During this time, she became an intimate friend of actress Marion Davies and joined the elite social circle of press baron William Randolph Hearst at Hearst Castle in San Simeon.

Dissatisfied with her mediocre roles in Hollywood films, Brooks went to Germany in 1929 and starred in three feature films that launched her to international stardom: Pandora's Box (1929), Diary of a Lost Girl (1929), and Miss Europe (Prix de Beauté) (1930); the first two were directed by G. W. Pabst. By 1938, she had starred in 14 silent films and 10 sound films. After retiring from acting, she fell upon financial hardship and became what she termed "a kept woman" to three wealthy men. For the next two decades, she was alcoholic and suicidal. Following the rediscovery of her films by cinephiles in the 1950s, a reclusive Brooks began writing articles about her film career; her insightful essays drew considerable acclaim. She published her memoir, Lulu in Hollywood, in 1982. Three years later, she died of a heart attack at age 78.

== Early life ==
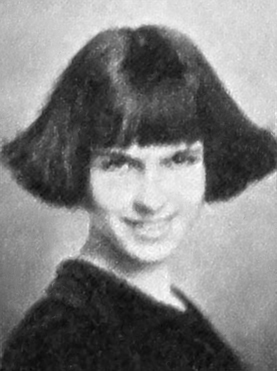
Brooks as a sophomore in high school, 1922. She had worn bobbed hair since childhood.

Brooks was born November 14, 1906, in Cherryvale, Kansas, the daughter of Leonard Porter Brooks, a lawyer, who was usually preoccupied with his legal practice, and Myra Rude, an artistic mother who said that any "squalling brats she produced could take care of themselves". Rude was a talented pianist who played the latest Debussy and Ravel for her children, inspiring them with a love of books and music.

Brooks described the hometown of her childhood as a typical Midwestern community where the inhabitants "prayed in the parlor and practiced incest in the barn." When Louise was nine years old, a neighborhood man sexually abused her. Beyond the physical trauma at the time, the event continued to have damaging psychological effects on her personal life as an adult and on her career. That early abuse caused her later to acknowledge that she was incapable of real love, explaining that this man: "must have had a great deal to do with forming my attitude toward sexual pleasure ... For me, nice, soft, easy men were never enough — there had to be an element of domination." When Brooks at last told her mother of the incident, many years later, her mother suggested that it must have been Louise's fault for "leading him on". In 1919, Brooks and her family moved to Independence, Kansas, before relocating to Wichita in 1920.

Brooks began her entertainment career as a dancer, joining the Denishawn School of Dancing and Related Arts modern dance company in New York at the age of 15 in 1922. The company included founders Ruth St. Denis and Ted Shawn, as well as a young Martha Graham. As a member of the globe-trotting troupe, Brooks spent a season abroad in London and in Paris. In her second season with the Denishawn company, she advanced to a starring role in one work opposite Shawn. But one day, a long-simmering personal conflict between Brooks and St. Denis boiled over, and St. Denis abruptly fired Brooks from the troupe in the spring of 1924, telling her in front of the other members: "I am dismissing you from the company because you want life handed to you on a silver salver." These words made a strong impression on Brooks; when she drew up an outline for a planned autobiographical novel in 1949, "The Silver Salver" was the title she gave the tenth and final chapter. Brooks was 17 years old at the time of her dismissal. Thanks to her friend Barbara Bennett, the sister of Constance and Joan Bennett, Brooks almost immediately found employment as a chorus girl in George White's Scandals, followed by an appearance as a semi-nude dancer in the 1925 edition of the Ziegfeld Follies at the Amsterdam Theater on 42nd Street.

As a result of her work in the Follies, Brooks came to the attention of Walter Wanger, a producer at Paramount Pictures. An infatuated Wanger signed her to a five-year contract with the studio in 1925. Soon after, Brooks met movie star Charlie Chaplin at a cocktail party given by Wanger. Chaplin was in town for the premiere of his film The Gold Rush (1925) at the Strand Theatre on Broadway. Chaplin and Brooks had a two-month affair (Note: In 1979, Brooks recalled her liaison with Charlie Chaplin: "I was eighteen in 1925, when Chaplin came to New York for the opening of The Gold Rush. He was just twice my age, and I had an affair with him for two happy summer months. Ever since he died, my mind has gone back fifty years, trying to define that lovely being from another world.") that summer while Chaplin was married to Lita Grey. When their affair ended, Chaplin sent her a check; she declined to write him a thank-you note.

== Career ==
=== Paramount films ===
Test footage from The American Venus, 1926

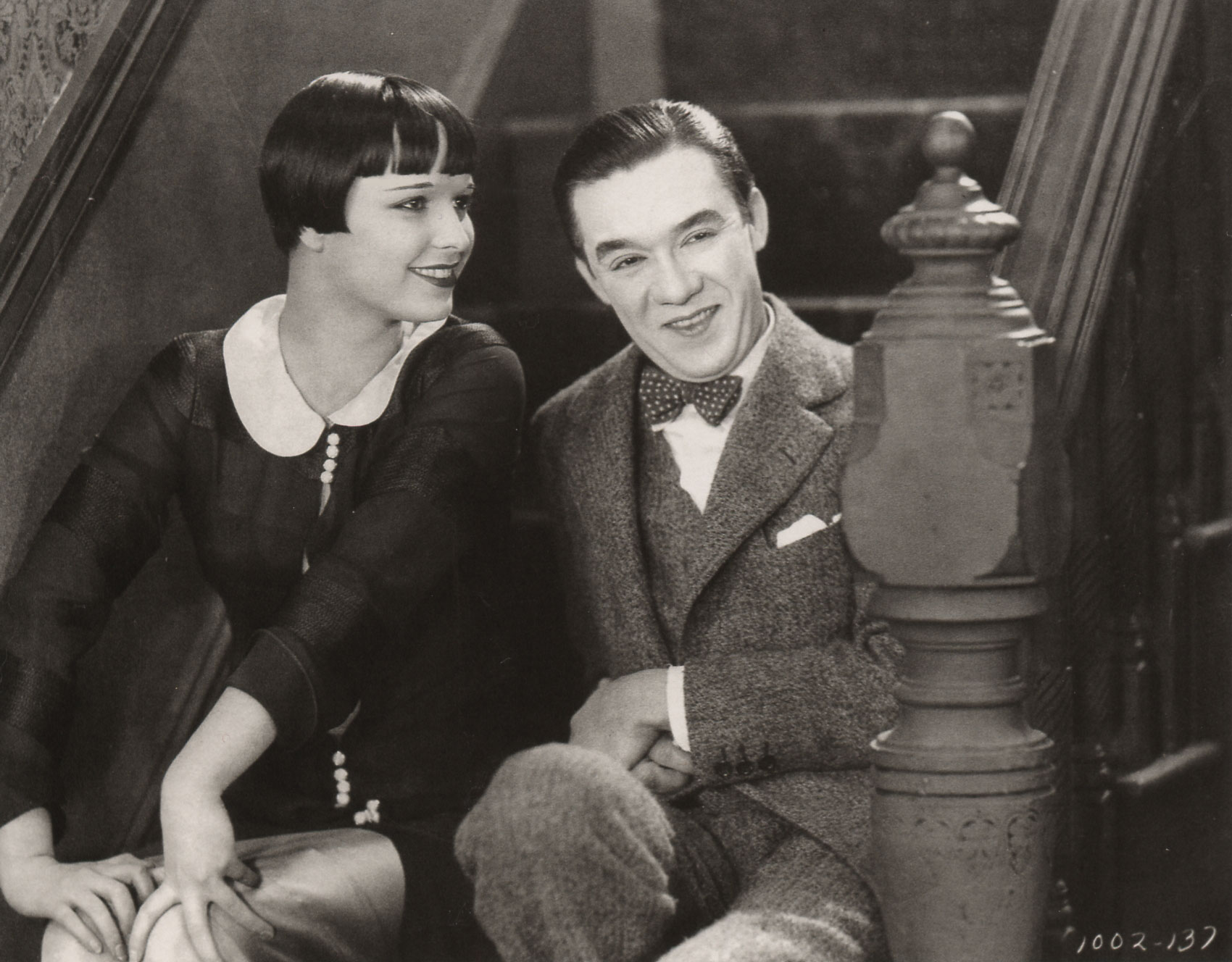
Brooks and Gregory Kelly in The Show-Off (1926)

Brooks made her screen debut in the silent The Street of Forgotten Men, in an uncredited role in 1925. Soon she was playing the female lead in a number of silent light comedies and flapper films over the next few years, starring with Adolphe Menjou and W. C. Fields, among others.

After her small roles in 1925, both Paramount and MGM offered her contracts. At the time, Brooks had an on-and-off affair with Walter Wanger, head of Paramount Pictures and husband of actress Justine Johnstone. Wanger tried to persuade her to take the MGM contract to avoid rumors that she only obtained the Paramount contract because of her intimate relationship with him. Despite his advice, she accepted Paramount's offer. During this time, Brooks gained a cult following in Europe for her pivotal vamp role in the 1928 Howard Hawks silent buddy film A Girl in Every Port. Her distinctive bob haircut helped start a trend, and many women styled their hair in imitation of both her and fellow film star Colleen Moore.

In the early sound film drama Beggars of Life (1928), Brooks plays an abused country girl who kills her foster father when he "attempts, one sunny morning, to rape her." A hobo (Richard Arlen) happens on the murder scene and convinces Brooks to disguise herself as a young boy and escape the law by "riding the rails" with him. In a hobo encampment, or "jungle," they meet another hobo (Wallace Beery). Brooks's disguise is soon uncovered and she finds herself the only female in a world of brutal, sex-hungry men. Much of this film was shot on location in the Jacumba Mountains near the Mexican border, and the boom microphone was invented for this film by the director William Wellman, who needed it for one of the first experimental talking scenes in the movies.

The filming of Beggars of Life proved to be an ordeal for Brooks. During the production, she had a one-night stand with a stuntman who, the next day, spread a false rumor on the set that Brooks had contracted syphilis during a previous weekend stay with a producer, ostensibly Jack Pickford. (Note: Brooks later wrote: "By Monday morning, everybody in Hollywood, including Eddie [Sutherland] and Jack's girlfriend, Bebe Daniels, knew that I had spent the night with Jack Pickford.) Concurrently, Brooks's interactions with her co-star Richard Arlen deteriorated, as Arlen was a close friend of Brooks's then-husband Eddie Sutherland and, according to Brooks, Arlen took a dim view of her casual liaisons with crew members. Amid these tensions, Brooks repeatedly clashed with Wellman, whose risk-taking directing style nearly killed her in a scene where she recklessly (Note: "[The crew] were dismayed when Billy [Wellman] persuaded me to take the place of my double, Harvey, and hop a fast-moving boxcar, which nearly sucked me under its wheels.") climbs aboard a moving train.

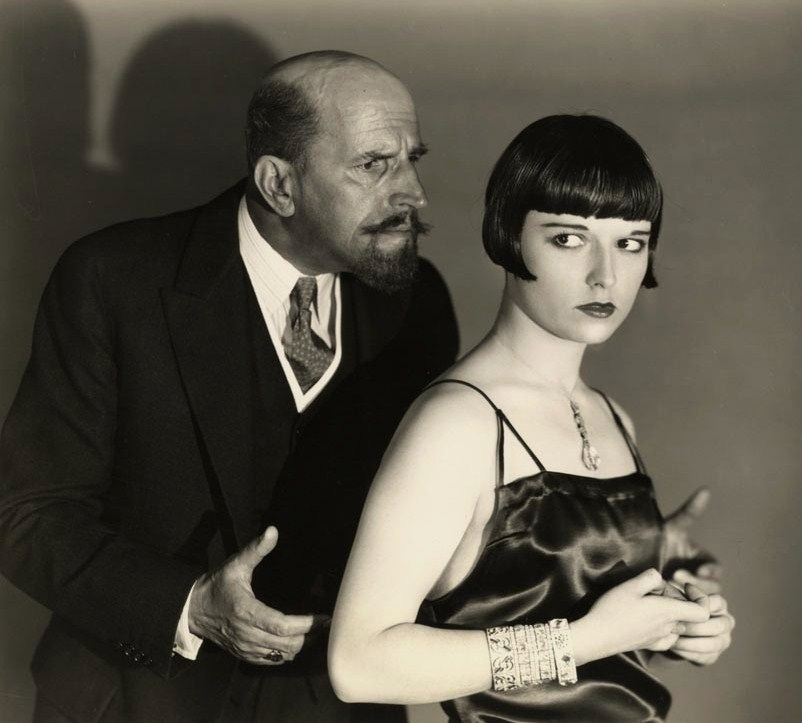
Brooks and Gustav von Seyffertitz in The Canary Murder Case (1929)

Soon after the production of Beggars of Life was completed, Brooks began filming the pre-Code crime-mystery film The Canary Murder Case (1929). By this time she was socializing with wealthy and famous persons. She was a frequent house guest of media magnate William Randolph Hearst and his mistress Marion Davies at Hearst Castle in San Simeon, being intimate friends with Davies's lesbian niece, Pepi Lederer. While partying with Lederer, Brooks had a brief sexual liaison with her. At some point in their friendship, Hearst and Davies were made aware of Lederer's lesbianism. Hearst arranged for Lederer to be committed to a mental institution for drug addiction. Several days after her arrival at the institution, Lederer — Brooks's closest friend and companion — committed suicide by jumping to her death from a hospital window. This event traumatized Brooks and likely led to her further dissatisfaction with Hollywood and the West Coast.

Brooks, who loathed the Hollywood "scene", refused to stay on at Paramount after being denied a promised raise. (Note: Brooks claimed she departed Hollywood as soon as circumstances permitted: "It pleased me on the day I finished the silent version of The Canary Murder Case for Paramount to leave Hollywood for Berlin to work for [G. W.] Pabst.") Learning of her refusal, her friend and lover George Preston Marshall counseled (Note: Brooks credited George Preston Marshall for her decision to star in Pandora's Box: "I'd never heard of Mr. Pabst when he offered me the part [in Pandora's Box]. It was George who insisted that I should accept it. He was passionately fond of the theater and films, and he slept with every pretty show-business girl he could find, including all my best friends. George took me to Berlin with his English valet.") her to sail with him to Europe in order to make films with director G. W. Pabst, the prominent Austrian director. On the last day of filming The Canary Murder Case Brooks departed Paramount Pictures to leave Hollywood for Berlin to work for Pabst. Thirty years later this decision would come to be seen as highly beneficial to her career, securing her reputation as a silent film legend and independent spirit.

While her snubbing of Paramount alone would not have finished her altogether in Hollywood, her subsequent refusal, after returning from Germany, to come back to Paramount for sound retakes of The Canary Murder Case (1929) irrevocably placed her on an unofficial blacklist. Angered by her refusal, the studio allegedly claimed that Brooks's voice was unsuitable for sound pictures (Note: Brooks asserted her career was sabotaged by Paramount when she refused to record her dialogue for The Canary Murder Case. "Goaded to fury, Paramount planted in the columns a petty but damaging little story to the effect that it had been compelled to replace Brooks because her voice was unusable in talkies.") and another actress, Margaret Livingston, (Note: According to Brooks: "When I got back to New York after finishing Pandora's Box, Paramount's New York office called to order me to get on the train at once for Hollywood. They were making The Canary Murder Case into a talkie and needed me for retakes. [...] I said I wouldn't go [...] In the end, after they were finally convinced that nothing would induce me to do the retakes, I signed a release (gratis) for all my pictures, and they dubbed in Margaret Livingston's voice.") was hired to dub Brooks's voice for the film.

=== European films ===
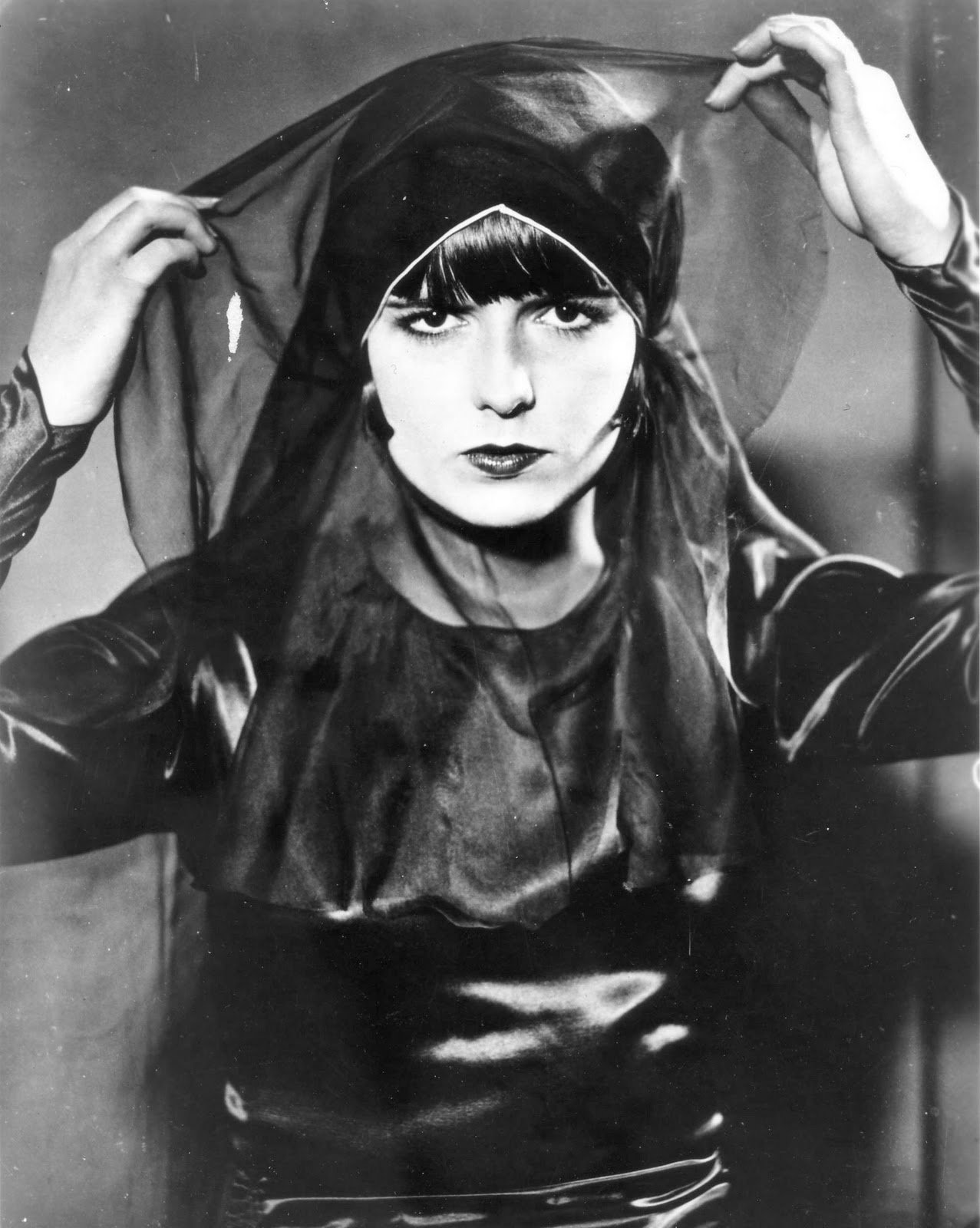
Brooks in her famous role as Lulu in the German film Pandora's Box (1929), directed by G. W. Pabst.

Brooks traveled to Europe accompanied by Marshall and his English valet. The German film industry was Hollywood's only major rival at the time, and the film industry based in Berlin was known as the Filmwelt ("film world"), reflecting its self-image as a highly glamorous "exclusive club". After their arrival in Weimar Germany, she starred in the 1929 silent film Pandora's Box, directed by Pabst in his New Objectivity period. Pabst was one of the leading directors of the filmwelt, known for his refined, elegant films that represented the filmwelt "at the height of its creative powers". The film Pandora's Box is based on two plays by Frank Wedekind (Erdgeist and Die Büchse der Pandora), and Brooks plays the central figure, Lulu. This film is notable for its frank treatment of modern sexual mores, including one of the first overt on-screen portrayals of a lesbian.

Brooks's performance in Pandora's Box made her a star. In looking for the right actress to play Lulu, Pabst had rejected Marlene Dietrich as "too old and too obvious". In choosing Brooks, a relative unknown who had only appeared — not to very great effect — in secondary roles, Pabst was going against the advice of those around him. Brooks recalled that "when we made Pandora's Box, Mr. Pabst was a man of 43 who astonished me with his knowledge on practically any subject. I, who astonished him because I knew practically nothing on every subject, celebrated my twenty-second birthday with a beer party on a London street." Brooks claimed her experience shooting Pandora's Box in Germany was a pleasant one:

In Hollywood, I was a pretty flibbertigibbet whose charm for the executive department decreased with every increase in my fan mail. In Berlin I stepped to the station platform to meet Mr. Pabst and became an actress. And his attitude was the pattern for all. Nobody offered me humorous or instructive comments on my acting. Everywhere I was treated with a kind of decency and respect unknown to me in Hollywood. It was just as if Mr. Pabst had sat in on my whole life and career and knew exactly where I needed assurance and protection.

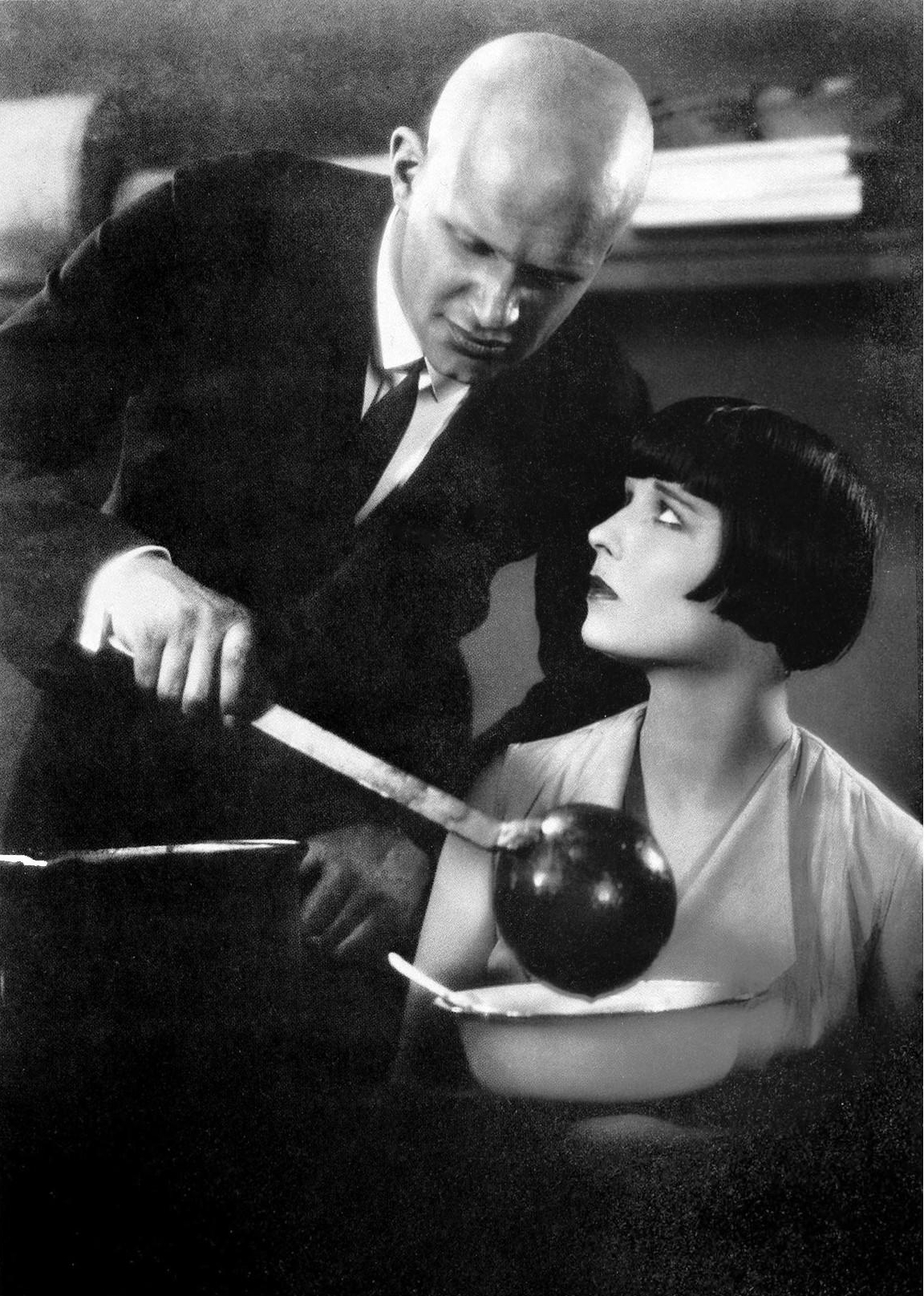
Louise Brooks and Andrews Engelmann in Diary of a Lost Girl (1929).

After the filming of Pandora's Box concluded, Brooks had a one-night stand (Note: Brooks insisted her affair with Pabst was brief. "In 1929, though, when he was in Paris trying to set up Prix de Beauté, we went out to dinner at a restaurant and I behaved rather outrageously. [...] I slapped a close friend of mine across the face with a bouquet of roses. Mr. Pabst was horrified. He hustled me out of the place and took me back to my hotel [...], so I decided to banish his disgust by giving the best sexual performance of my career. [...] He wanted the affair to continue. But I didn't.") with Pabst, and the director cast Brooks again in his controversial social drama Diary of a Lost Girl (1929), based on the book by Margarete Böhme. In performing Diary of a Lost Girl, Brooks drew upon her memories of being molested as a 9-year-old and then being blamed by her mother for her own molestation, later recalling on that day she became one of the "lost". On the final day of shooting Diary of a Lost Girl, Pabst counseled Brooks not to return to Hollywood and instead to stay in Germany and to continue her career as a serious actress. Pabst expressed concern that Brooks's carefree approach towards her career would end in dire poverty "exactly like Lulu's". He further cautioned Brooks that Marshall and her "rich American friends" would likely shun her when her career stalled.

When audiences and critics first viewed Brooks's German films, they were bewildered by her naturalistic acting style. Viewers purportedly exited the theatre vocally complaining, "She doesn't act! She does nothing!" In the late 1920s, cinemagoers were habituated to stage-style acting with exaggerated body language and facial expressions. Brooks's acting style was subtle because she understood that the close-up images of the actors' bodies and faces made such exaggerations unnecessary. Explaining her method, Brooks said that acting "does not consist of descriptive movement of face and body but in the movements of thought and soul transmitted in a kind of intense isolation." This innovative style continues to be used by contemporary film actors but, at the time, it was surprising to viewers who assumed she wasn't acting at all. Film critic Roger Ebert later wrote that, by employing this method, "Brooks became one of the most modern and effective of actors, projecting a presence that could be startling."

Her appearances in Pabst's two films made Brooks an international star. According to film critic and historian Molly Haskell, the films "expos[ed] her animal sensuality and turn[ed] her into one of the most erotic figures on the screen — the bold, black-helmeted young girl who, with only a shy grin to acknowledge her 'fall,' became a prostitute in Diary of a Lost Girl and who, with no more sense of sin than a baby, drives men out of their minds in Pandora's Box."

Brooks in Miss Europe (1930)

Near the end of 1929, English film critic and journalist Cedric Belfrage interviewed Pabst for an article about Brooks's film work in Europe that was published in the February 1930 issue of the American monthly Motion Picture. According to Belfrage, Pabst attributed Brooks's acting success outside the U.S. to her seemingly inherent or instinctive "European" sensibilities:

the eminent Herr Pabst described it to me over a cocktail in the Bristol Bar, Berlin. "Louise,'" said Herr Pabst, "has a European soul. You can't get away from it. When she described Hollywood to me — I have never been there — I cry out against the absurd fate that ever put her there at all. She belongs to Europe and to Europeans. She has been a sensational hit in her German pictures. I do not have her play silly little cuties. She plays real women, and plays them marvelously."

Belfarge elaborated on Brooks's opinion of Hollywood, and referred to Pabst's firsthand knowledge of that opinion. "The very mention of the place," he stated, "gives her a sensation of nausea." He continued, "The pettiness of it, the dullness, the monotony, the stupidity — no, no, that is no place for Louise Brooks."

After the success of her German films, Brooks appeared in one more European film, Miss Europe (1930), a French film by Italian director Augusto Genina.

=== Return to America ===
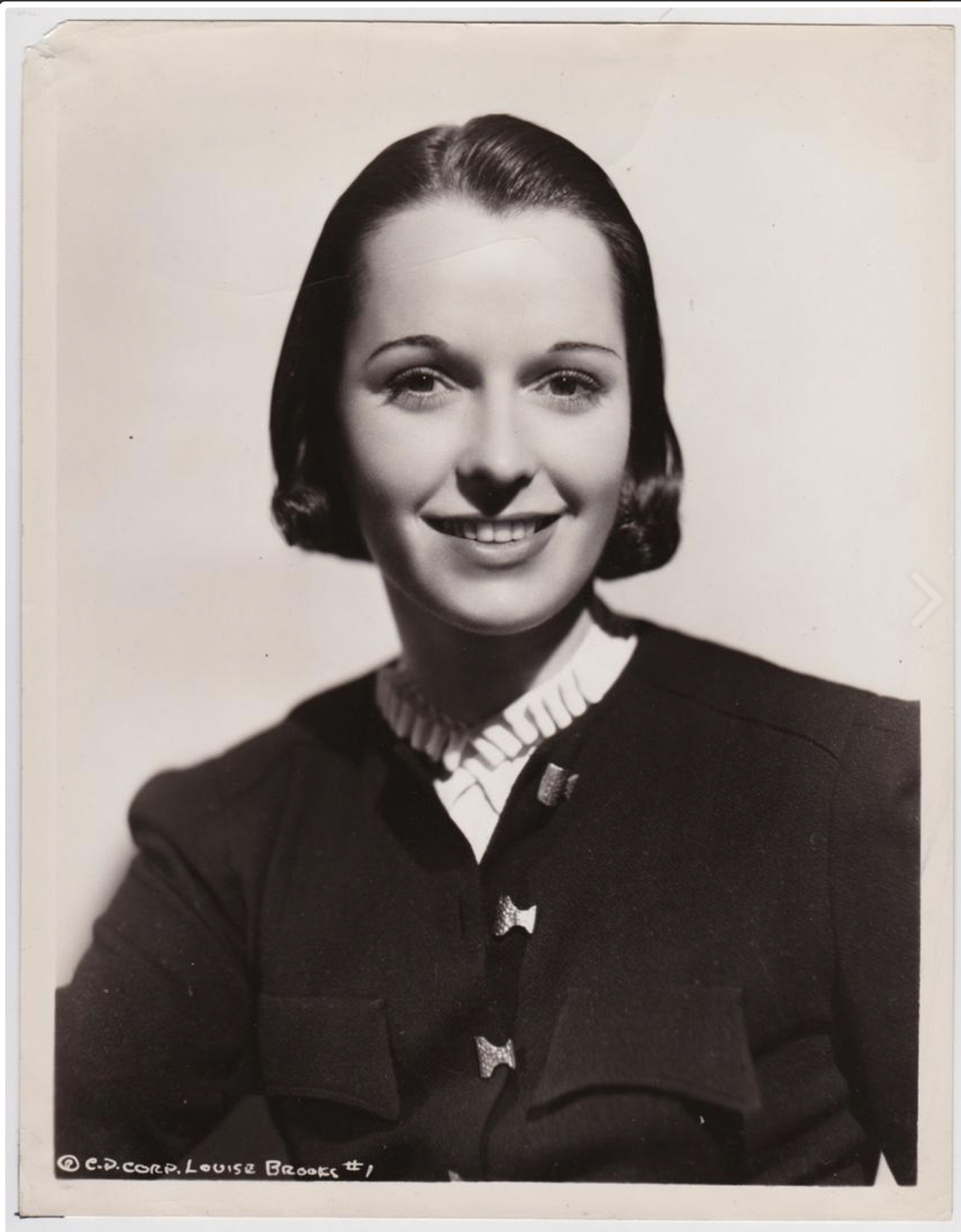
Publicity still of Brooks from Windy Riley Goes Hollywood (1931) featuring her new hairstyle without bangs.

Dissatisfied with Europe, Brooks returned to New York in December 1929. When she returned to Hollywood in 1931, she was cast in two mainstream films, God's Gift to Women (1931) and It Pays to Advertise (1931), but her performances were largely ignored by critics, and few other job offers were forthcoming due to her informal "blacklisting". As the sole member of the cast who had refused to return to make the talkie version of The Canary Murder Case, Brooks became convinced that "no major studio would hire [her] to make a film."

Purportedly, Wellman — despite their previous acrimonious relationship on Beggars of Life — offered Brooks the female lead in his new picture The Public Enemy, starring James Cagney. Brooks turned down Wellman's offer in order to visit Marshall in New York City, and the coveted role instead went to Jean Harlow, who then began her own rise to stardom. Brooks later claimed she declined the role because she "hated Hollywood," but film historian James Card, who came to know Brooks intimately later in her life, said that Brooks "just wasn't interested ... She was more interested in Marshall". In the opinion of biographer Barry Paris, "turning down Public Enemy marked the real end of Louise Brooks's film career".

She returned to Hollywood after being offered of a $500 weekly salary from Columbia Pictures but, after refusing to do a screen test for a Buck Jones Western film, the contract offer was withdrawn. She made one more film at that time, a two-reel comedy short, Windy Riley Goes Hollywood (1931), directed by disgraced Hollywood outcast Fatty Arbuckle, who worked under the pseudonym "William Goodrich".

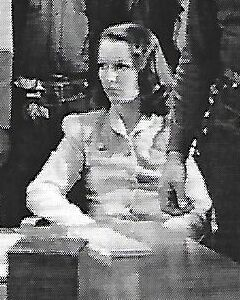
Brooks in Overland Stage Raiders (1938), her final film. Note her long hairstyle, drastically different from her trademark bob haircut

Brooks declared bankruptcy in 1932, and began dancing in nightclubs to earn a living. She attempted a film comeback in 1936 and did a bit part in Empty Saddles, a Western that led Columbia to offer her a screen test, contingent on appearing in the 1937 musical When You're in Love, uncredited, as a specialty ballerina in the chorus. In 1937, Brooks obtained a bit part in the film King of Gamblers after a private interview on a Paramount set with director Robert Florey, who "specialised in giving jobs to destitute and sufficiently grateful actresses." Unfortunately, after filming, Brooks's scenes were deleted.

Brooks made two more films after that, including the 1938 Western Overland Stage Raiders in which she played the romantic lead opposite John Wayne, with a long hairstyle that rendered her all but unrecognizable from her Lulu days. In contemporary reviews of the film in newspapers and trade publications, Brooks received little attention from critics. The review by The Film Daily in September 1938 provides one example, barely mentioning her, saying only, "Louise Brooks makes an appearance as a female attraction." Variety, the nation's leading entertainment publication, also devoted very little ink to her in its review. "Louise Brooks is the femme appeal with nothing much to do", it reports, "except look glamorous in a shoulder-length straight-bang coiffure."

== Life after film ==
=== Economic hardship ===
Brooks's career prospects as a film actress had significantly declined by 1940. According to the federal census in May that year, she was living in a $55-a-month apartment at 1317 North Fairfax Avenue in West Hollywood and was working as a copywriter for a magazine. Soon, however, Brooks found herself unemployed and increasingly desperate for a steady income. She also realized during this time that "the only people who wanted to see me were men who wanted to sleep with me." That realization was underscored by Brooks's longtime friend, Paramount executive Walter Wanger, who warned her that she would likely "become a call girl" if she remained in Hollywood. Upon hearing Wanger's warning, Brooks purportedly also remembered Pabst's earlier predictions about the dire circumstances to which she would be driven if her career stalled in Hollywood: "I heard his [Pabst's] words again — hissing back to me. And listening this time, I packed my trunks and went home to Kansas."

Brooks briefly returned to Wichita, where she was raised, but this undesired return "turned out to be another kind of hell". "I retired first to my father's home in Wichita," she later recalled, "but there I found that the citizens could not decide whether they despised me for having once been a success away from home or for now being a failure in their midst". For her part, Brooks admitted that "I wasn't exactly enchanted with them," and "I must confess to a lifelong curse: My own failure as a social creature."

After an unsuccessful attempt at operating a dance studio, she returned to New York City. Following brief stints there as a radio actor in soap operas and a gossip columnist, she worked as a salesgirl in a Saks Fifth Avenue store in Manhattan. Between 1948 and 1953, Brooks embarked upon a career as a courtesan with a few select wealthy men as clients. As her finances eroded, an impoverished Brooks began working regularly for an escort agency in New York. Recalling this difficult period in her memoirs, Brooks wrote that she frequently pondered suicide:

I found that the only well-paying career open to me, as an unsuccessful actress of thirty-six, was that of a call girl ... and (I) began to flirt with the fancies related to little bottles filled with yellow sleeping pills.

Brooks spent subsequent years "drinking and escorting" while subsisting in obscurity and poverty in a small New York apartment. By this time, "all of her rich and famous friends had forgotten her." Angered by this ostracism, she attempted to write a tell-all memoir titled Naked on My Goat, a title drawn from Goethe's epic play, Faust. After working on that autobiography for years, Brooks destroyed the entire manuscript by throwing it into an incinerator. As time passed, she increasingly drank more and continued to suffer from suicidal tendencies.

=== Rediscovery ===
There is no Garbo! There is no Dietrich! There is only Louise Brooks! (Note: According to critic Roger Ebert, Brooks visited Paris "for a retrospective at the Cinémathèque Française, where rumpled old Henri Langlois declared, 'There is no Garbo! There is no Dietrich! There is only Louise Brooks!' Brooks must have smiled to hear her name linked with two of her reputed lovers.")

— Henri Langlois, 1953

In 1955, French film historians such as Henri Langlois rediscovered Brooks's films, proclaiming her an unparalleled actress who surpassed even Marlene Dietrich and Greta Garbo as a film icon, much to her purported amusement. This rediscovery led to a Louise Brooks film festival in 1957 and rehabilitated her reputation in her home country.

During this time, James Card, the film curator for the George Eastman House in Rochester, New York, discovered Brooks "living as a recluse" in New York City. He persuaded her in 1956 to move to be near the George Eastman House film collection where she could study cinema and write about her past career. With Card's assistance, she became a noted film writer. Although Brooks had been a heavy drinker since the age of 14, she remained relatively sober to begin writing perceptive essays on cinema in film magazines, which became her second career. A collection of her writings, titled Lulu in Hollywood, published in 1982 and still in print, was heralded by film critic Roger Ebert as "one of the few film books that can be called indispensable."

In her later years, Brooks rarely granted interviews, yet had special relationships with film historians John Kobal and Kevin Brownlow. In the 1970s, she was interviewed extensively on film for the documentaries Memories of Berlin: The Twilight of Weimar Culture (1976), produced and directed by Gary Conklin, and Hollywood (1980), by Brownlow and David Gill. Lulu in Berlin (1984) is another rare filmed interview, produced by Richard Leacock and Susan Woll, released a year before her death but filmed a decade earlier. In 1979, she was profiled by the film writer Kenneth Tynan in his essay "The Girl in the Black Helmet", the title an allusion to her bobbed hair, worn since childhood. In 1982, writer Tom Graves was allowed into Brooks's small apartment for an interview, and later wrote about the often awkward and tense conversation in his article "My Afternoon with Louise Brooks".

== Personal life ==
=== Marriages and relationships ===
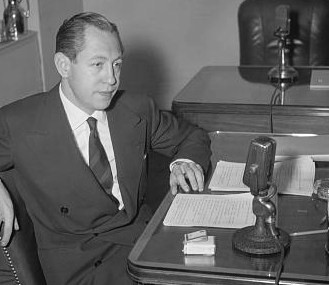
In her later years, Brooks's friend and one-time youthful lover, William Paley, later founder of CBS, gave her a check every month until her death.

In the summer of 1926, Brooks married Eddie Sutherland, the director of the film she made with W. C. Fields, but by 1927 had become infatuated with George Preston Marshall, owner of a chain of laundries and future owner of the Washington Redskins football team, following a chance meeting with him that she later referred to as "the most fateful encounter of my life". She divorced Sutherland, mainly due to her budding relationship with Marshall, in June 1928. Sutherland was purportedly extremely distraught when Brooks divorced him and, on the first night after their separation, he attempted to take his life with an overdose of sleeping pills.

Throughout the late 1920s and early 1930s, Brooks continued her on-again, off-again relationship with George Preston Marshall, which she later described as abusive. Marshall was purportedly "her frequent bedfellow and constant adviser between 1927 and 1933." Marshall repeatedly asked her to marry him but, after learning that she had had many affairs while they were together and believing her to be incapable of fidelity, he married film actress Corinne Griffith instead.

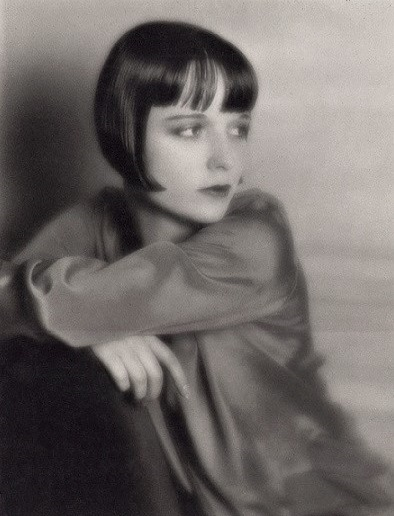
Studio portrait by Russell Ball, 1920s

In 1933, she married Chicago millionaire Deering Davis, a son of Nathan Smith Davis Jr., but abruptly left him in March 1934 after only five months of marriage, "without a good-bye ... and leaving only a note of her intentions" behind her. According to Card, Davis was just "another elegant, well-heeled admirer", nothing more. The couple officially divorced in 1938.

In her later years, Brooks insisted that both her previous marriages were loveless and that she had never loved anyone in her lifetime: "As a matter of fact, I've never been in love. And if I had loved a man, could I have been faithful to him? Could he have trusted me beyond a closed door? I doubt it." Despite her two marriages, she never had children, referring to herself as "Barren Brooks." Her many paramours from years before had included a young William S. Paley, the founder of CBS. Paley provided a small monthly stipend to Brooks for the remainder of her life, and this stipend kept her from committing suicide at one point.

Sometime in September 1953, Brooks converted to Roman Catholicism, but she left the church in 1964.

=== Sexuality ===
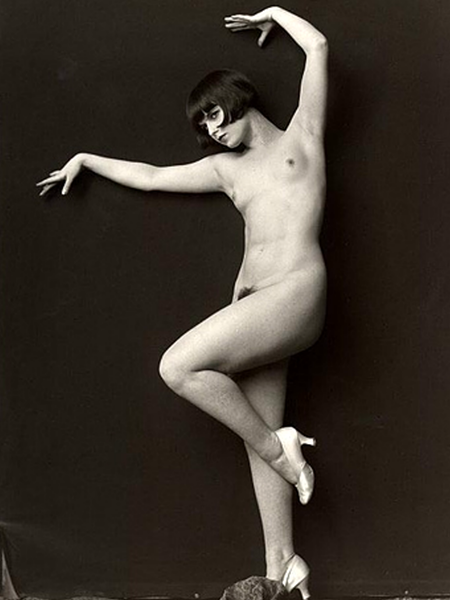
Brooks sued the glamour photographer John de Mirjian to prevent him from distributing his nude portraits of her.

By her own admission, Brooks was a sexually liberated woman, unafraid to experiment, even posing nude for art photography. In 1925, Brooks sued the New York glamour photographer John de Mirjian to prevent publication of his risqué studio portraits of her; the lawsuit made him notorious.

Brooks enjoyed fostering speculation about her sexuality, cultivating friendships with lesbian and bisexual women including Pepi Lederer and Peggy Fears, but eschewing relationships. She admitted to some lesbian dalliances, including a one-night stand with Greta Garbo. She later described Garbo as masculine but a "charming and tender lover". Despite all this, she considered herself neither lesbian nor bisexual:

I had a lot of fun writing "Marion Davies' Niece" [an article about Pepi Lederer], leaving the lesbian theme in question marks. All my life it has been fun for me. ... When I am dead, I believe that film writers will fasten on the story that I am a lesbian ... I have done lots to make it believable ... All my women friends have been lesbians. But that is one point upon which I agree positively with Christopher Isherwood: There is no such thing as bisexuality. Ordinary people, although they may accommodate themselves, for reasons of whoring or marriage, are one-sexed. Out of curiosity, I had two affairs with girls — they did nothing for me.

According to biographer Barry Paris, Brooks had a "clear preference for men", but she did not discourage the rumors that she was a lesbian, both because she relished their shock value, which enhanced her aura, and because she personally valued feminine beauty. Paris thinks Brooks "loved women as a homosexual man, rather than as a lesbian, would love them. ... The operative rule with Louise was neither heterosexuality, homosexuality, or bisexuality. It was just sexuality ...".

== Death ==
On August 8, 1985, after suffering from degenerative osteoarthritis of the hip and emphysema for many years, Brooks died of a heart attack in her apartment in Rochester, New York.

== Legacy ==
Since her death in 1985, significant allusions to Brooks have appeared in novels, comics, music, and film.

=== Film ===
I went to my father [film director Vincente Minnelli], and asked him, what can you tell me about Thirties glamour? Should I be emulating Marlene Dietrich or something? And he said no, I should study everything I can about Louise Brooks.

— Liza Minnelli, Inside the Actors Studio,
on her portrayal of "Sally Bowles" in Cabaret (1972)

Brooks has inspired cinematic characters such as Sally Bowles in Bob Fosse's 1972 film Cabaret. For her portrayal of Bowles, Liza Minnelli reinvented the character with "Lulu makeup and helmet-like coiffure" based on Brooks's 1920s persona. Similarly, films such as Jonathan Demme's Something Wild features a reckless femme fatale (Melanie Griffith) who calls herself "Lulu" and wears a bob, and in the 1992 film Death Becomes Her, Isabella Rossellini plays Lisle von Rhoman, a character inspired by Brooks. In Nora Ephron's 1994 film Mixed Nuts, Liev Schreiber portrays a character with a strong resemblance to Ms. Brooks for the cut of her hair, her mannerisms and facial expressions. More recently, in 2018, the PBS film The Chaperone was released, which depicts Brooks's initial arrival in New York and alludes to her career decline as an actress. The film stars Haley Lu Richardson and Elizabeth McGovern.

=== Literature ===
Brooks's film persona served as the literary inspiration for Adolfo Bioy Casares's science fiction novel The Invention of Morel (1940). This concerns a man attracted to Faustine, a woman who is only a projected 3-D image. In a 1995 interview, Casares explained that Faustine is directly based on his love for Louise Brooks who "vanished too early from the movies". Elements of his novel, minus the science fiction elements, served as a basis for Alain Resnais's 1961 film Last Year at Marienbad.

Brooks plays a role in Dutch writer Willem Frederik Hermans's 1987 novel The Saint of the Clockmakers.

In Neil Gaiman's 2001 novel American Gods, the character Czernobog refers to Brooks as the greatest movie star of all time.

In Ali Smith's 2011 novel There But For The, the character Brooke Bayoude is revealed at a dinner party to have been named after Louise Brooks, though in a play on Brooks's name the dinner guests apparently mistake Brooks for Debbie Flood or Louise Woodward.

In her supernatural horror novel Houdini Heart (2011), author Ki Longfellow uses Brooks as a character in the leading character's visions.

Brooks appears as a central character in the 2012 novel The Chaperone by Laura Moriarty. In Gayle Forman's novels Just One Day and Just One Year, the protagonist is called "Lulu" because her bobbed hair resembles Brooks'.

In the German novel The Director (2023) by Daniel Kehlmann, Brooks, as well as G.W.Pabst, appears as a character.

=== Comics ===
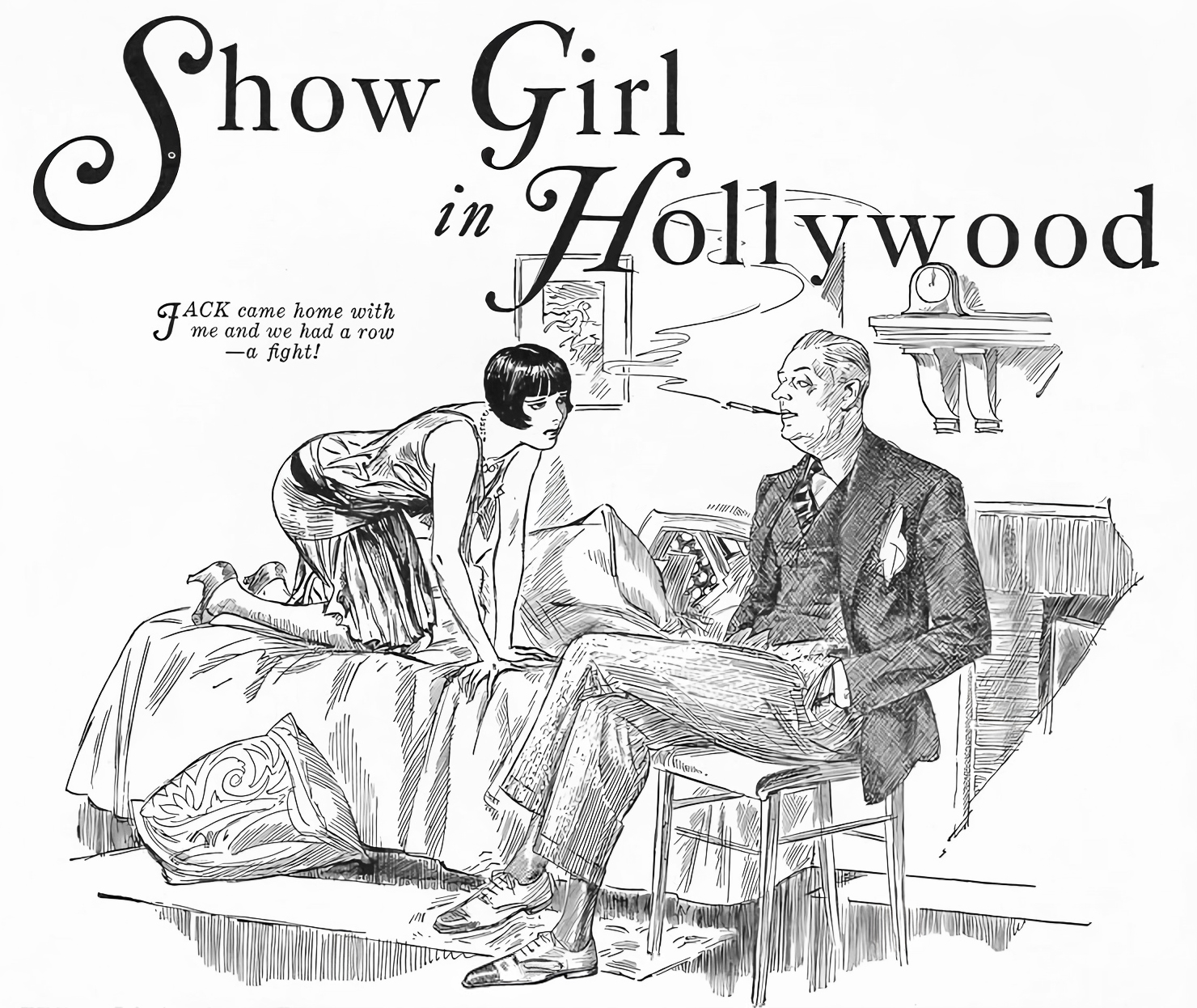
A panel of the September 14, 1929, comic strip Dixie Dugan. Dugan's appearance and escapades were based on Louise Brooks.

Brooks also had a significant influence in the graphics world. She inspired the long-running Dixie Dugan newspaper strip by John H. Striebel. The strip began in the late 1920s and ran until 1966. It grew out of the serialized novel and later stage musical, Show Girl, that writer J. P. McEvoy had loosely based on Brooks's days as a Follies girl on Broadway.

Brooks also inspired the erotic comic books of Valentina, by the late Guido Crepax, which began publication in 1965 and continued for many years. Crepax became a friend and regular correspondent of Brooks late in her life. Hugo Pratt, another comics artist, also used her as inspiration for characters, and even named them after her.

Other comics have drawn upon Brooks's distinctive hair-style. Brooks was the visual model for the character of Ivy Pepper in Tracy Butler's Lackadaisy comic series. Illustrator Rick Geary published a 2015 graphic novel entitled Louise Brooks: Detective in which Brooks, "her movie career having sputtered to a stop", returns to her native Kansas in 1940 and becomes a private investigator who solves murders.

=== Music ===
Brooks has been referenced in a number of songs. In 1991, British new wave group Orchestral Manoeuvres in the Dark released "Pandora's Box" as a tribute to Brooks's film. Similarly, Soul Coughing's 1998 song "St. Louise Is Listening" contains several references to Brooks, and the song "Interior Lulu" released the next year by Marillion is a reference to Brooks and mentions her in its first lines.

In 2011, American metal group Metallica and singer-songwriter Lou Reed released the double album Lulu with a Brooks-like mannequin on the cover.

In Natalie Merchant's self-titled 2014 album, the song "Lulu" is a biographical portrait of Brooks.

== Filmography ==
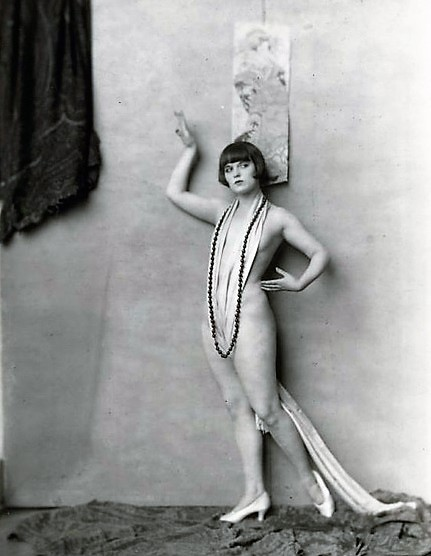
Portrait of Brooks by Alfred Cheney Johnston

Brooks made 24 films during the course of her career. Sixteen survive mostly extant, four are partially extant, and four are considered lost. Her three European films, for which she is best known, survive, as do others of her significant American silents, such as A Girl in Every Port and Beggars of Life. Each of Brooks's sound films survives.

With the advent of home video, each of Brooks' surviving or partially surviving films have been released on VHS, laser disc, DVD or Blu-ray in the United States, Europe or elsewhere. (There have been a handful of releases in Australia, Brazil, India, Japan, and South Korea.) A small number of these releases have featured a newly restored version of the films. Over time, there have been more than 150 releases of physical media from around the world. In 2026, Flicker Alley released Focus on Louise Brooks. It contained surviving material from The Street of Forgotten Men, The American Venus, Just Another Blonde, and Now We're in the Air.

A few of the documentary films about Louise Brooks have likewise been released on either VHS, laser disc, or DVD, or as bonus material included along with a film.

Year	Title	Role	Director	Notes
1925	The Street of Forgotten Men	A Moll	Herbert Brenon	Incomplete (missing reel 2)
1926	The American Venus	Miss Bayport	Frank Tuttle	Lost film. In the late 1990s some fragments in both black & white and color were found in Australia. In 2018 a three-second-long technicolor screen test featuring Brooks was discovered by archivist Jane Fernandes, the only color film footage of the actress during her prime known to exist. Another lost scene was found in 2018 in a YouTube video that had been uploaded to the site in 2007.
1926	A Social Celebrity	Kitty Laverne	Malcolm St. Clair	Lost film
1926	It's the Old Army Game	Mildred Marshall	A. Edward Sutherland	Extant
1926	The Show Off	Clara	Malcolm St. Clair	Extant
1926	Just Another Blonde	Diana O'Sullivan	Alfred Santell	Fragments survive
1926	Love 'Em and Leave 'Em	Janie Walsh	Frank Tuttle	Extant
1927	Evening Clothes	Fox Trot	Luther Reed	Lost film
1927	Rolled Stockings	Carol Fleming	Richard Rosson	Lost film
1927	Now We're in the Air	Griselle/Grisette	Frank R. Strayer	In 2016, a 23-minute fragment was found at the Czech national film archive in Prague. The surviving material was preserved and shown for the first time at the San Francisco Silent Film Festival on June 2, 2017.
1927	The City Gone Wild	Snuggles Joy	James Cruze	Lost film
1928	A Girl in Every Port	Marie, Girl in France	Howard Hawks	Extant
1928	Beggars of Life	The Girl (Nancy)	William A. Wellman	Extant: Sound version is considered lost; only silent version survives.
1929	The Canary Murder Case	Margaret Odell	Malcolm St. Clair	Extant: Only sound version survives.
1929	Pandora's Box	Lulu	G. W. Pabst	Extant
1929	Diary of a Lost Girl	Thymian	G. W. Pabst	Extant
1930	Miss Europe	Lucienne Garnier	Augusto Genina	Extant – Alternative title: Prix de Beauté [Beauty Prize]. Brooks's first sound film. Silent and sound versions survive.
1931	It Pays to Advertise	Thelma Temple	Frank Tuttle	Extant
1931	God's Gift to Women	Florine	Michael Curtiz	Extant
1931	Windy Riley Goes Hollywood	Betty Grey	Roscoe Arbuckle	Extant
1936	Empty Saddles	"Boots" Boone	Lesley Selander	Extant
1937	When You're in Love	Chorus Girl	Robert Riskin	Extant (Uncredited role)
1937	King of Gamblers	Joyce Beaton	Robert Florey	Extant (Scenes deleted)
1938	Overland Stage Raiders	Beth Hoyt	George Sherman	Extant
