= Nathan Smith Davis =

American physician (1817–1904)

Nathan Smith Davis, Sr.
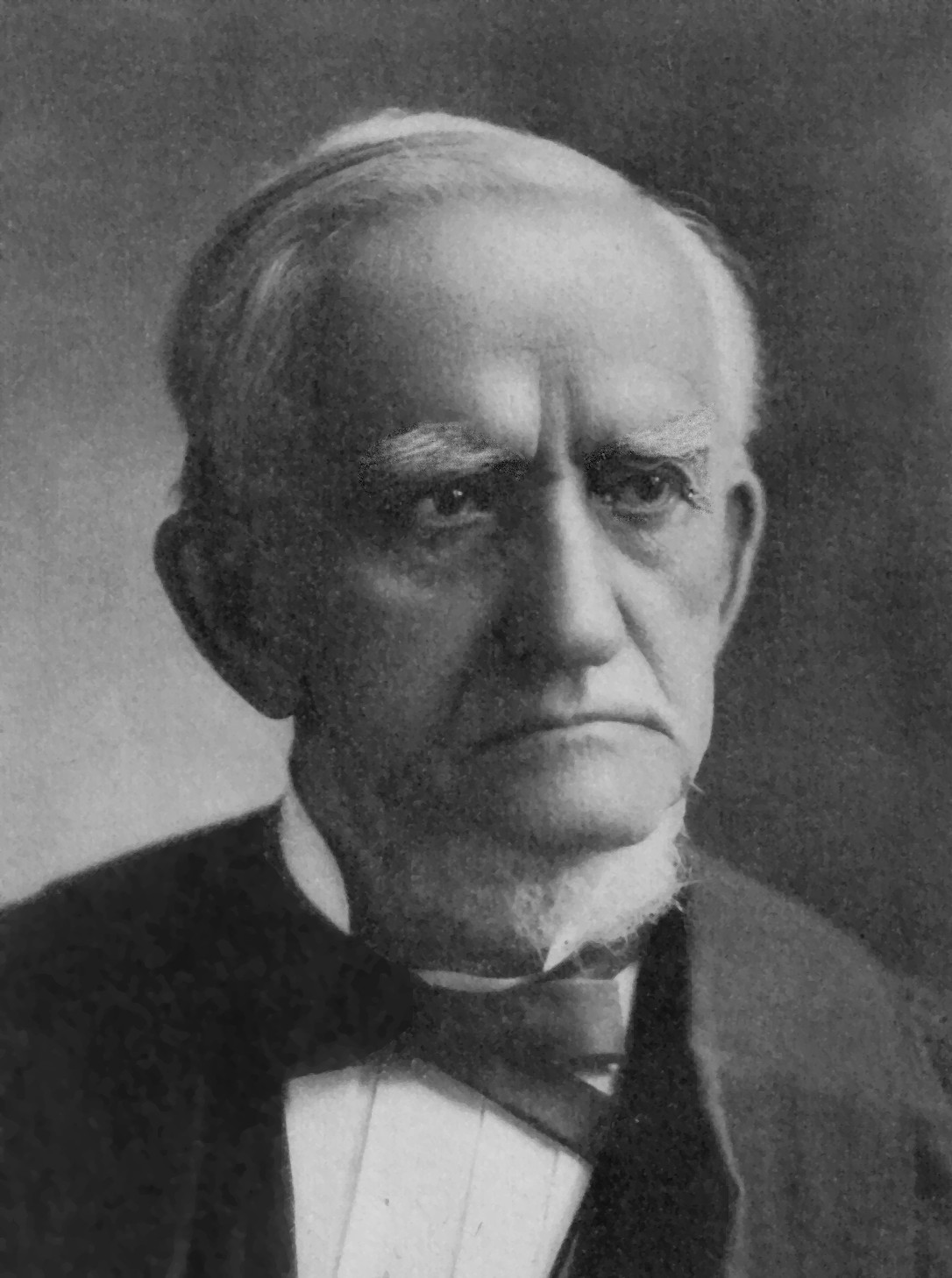
- Davis two months before his death
- Born: January 9, 1817 near Greene, Chenango County, New York, US
- Died: June 16, 1904 (aged 87); Chicago, Illinois, US
- Years active: from 1834
- Children: Nathan Smith Davis Jr.
- Medical career
- Profession: Medicine
- Institutions: Rush Medical College, Mercy Hospital and Medical Center, Northwestern University

Nathan Smith Davis Sr., M.D., LLD (January 9, 1817 – June 16, 1904) was a physician who was instrumental in the establishment of the American Medical Association and was twice elected its president. He became the first editor of the Journal of the American Medical Association.

== Biography ==
Davis was born near Greene, Chenango County, New York. He lived and worked on the farm until 16 years of age, attending district school in the winter, and studying for six months in Cazenovia Seminary. At the age of 17 he began mastering medicine under Dr. Daniel Clark, attended three courses of lectures at the College of Physicians and Surgeons of the Western District of New York, Fairfield, and was graduated from that institution, on January 31, 1837, with a thesis on "Animal Temperature". He first practiced in Vienna, New York, but after a few months moved to Binghamton, New York, and soon after settled in New York City.

In 1841, he was awarded the prize from the Medical Society of the State of New York for the best "Analysis of the Discoveries Concerning the Physiology of the Nervous System." About seven years later the State Agricultural Society of New York awarded him a prize for a "Text-Book on Agricultural Chemistry." He became a member of the Broome County Medical Society, and was one of its censors in 1838. In 1841, 1842 and 1843 he was secretary and librarian of the society, and in 1843 delegate from Broome County to the Medical Society of the State of New York. In 1845 his report as chairman of the Committee on Correspondence relative to Medical Education and Examination led to the organization of the American Medical Association.

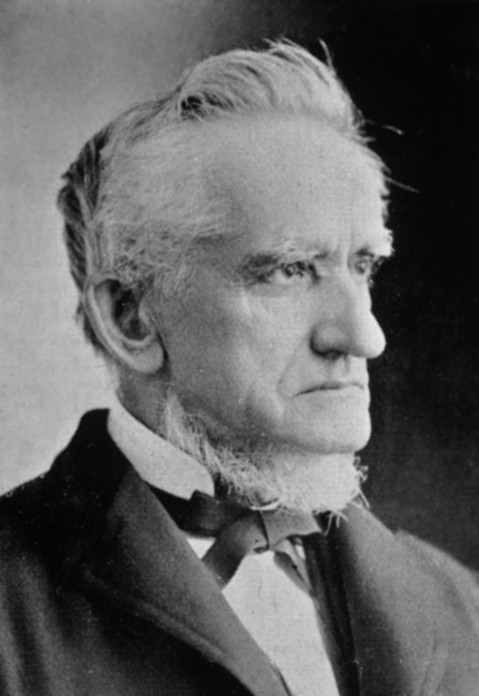

Almost from the beginning of his career, Davis was identified with medical education. While in Binghamton, he obtained a cadaver and demonstrated anatomy to medical students. His first work as a teacher was lecturer and demonstrator of anatomy in the College of Physicians and Surgeons in the city of New York in 1848. A year later he moved to Chicago and accepted the chair of physiology and pathology in Rush Medical College. A year later, in addition, he assumed the duties of the chair of practice of medicine, and remained connected with the institution for ten years. Soon after he became connected with this college, he appreciated the necessity of a better system of medical education, as at that time there was no classification of students and no adjustable curriculum. He began to agitate for reform, but was opposed. He withdrew, and with a few colleagues founded the Chicago Medical College, of which he was for more than forty years the dean and professor of principles and practice of medicine. When Davis arrived in Chicago, there was no organization of physicians, and he was one of the prime movers in the Chicago Medical Society and the Illinois State Medical Society. For twelve years he was secretary of the Chicago Medical Society, and in 1855 served as its president.

Soon after his arrival in Chicago, there was an epidemic of malaria, and he found on analyzing the drinking water that it was polluted by sewage. He straightway began agitation for a system of drainage, and to this end delivered a number of lectures resulting in sewerage reconstruction and foundation of Mercy Hospital. His editorial work began while he was residing in New York City, where he was editor of the Annalist. In 1855 became editor of the Chicago Medical Journal, and five years later the Chicago Medical Examiner, remaining with these journals for twenty years. It was chiefly through his efforts that the Journal of the American Medical Association (JAMA) was established in 1883, and he was its first editor, continuing in that position for six years. He was a member of the International Medical Congress in 1876, and at that time read a notable paper on "American Medical Institutions." In 1887 he was secretary-general and later president of the Ninth International Medical Congress in Washington. While organizing this congress, he was stricken with cerebral hemorrhage, but recovered within three weeks.

Davis was the founder of the American Medical Association (AMA), served as its president in 1864 and 1865 and as a trustee from 1882 to 1884. He was the founder and first editor of JAMA. He was one of the founders of Lind University, which was reorganized into the Chicago Medical College and in 1870 became the medical school of Northwestern University. He was also a founder of the Chicago Academy of Sciences, the Chicago Historical Society, the Illinois State Microscopical Society and Union College of Law, of which he was professor of medical jurisprudence. He was also an honorary member of the British Medical Association, and many other scientific societies in the US and abroad, a charter member of the American Medical Association, American Medical Temperance Association, Illinois State Medical Society, and the Chicago Medical Society. A Chicago Public School was later named after him.

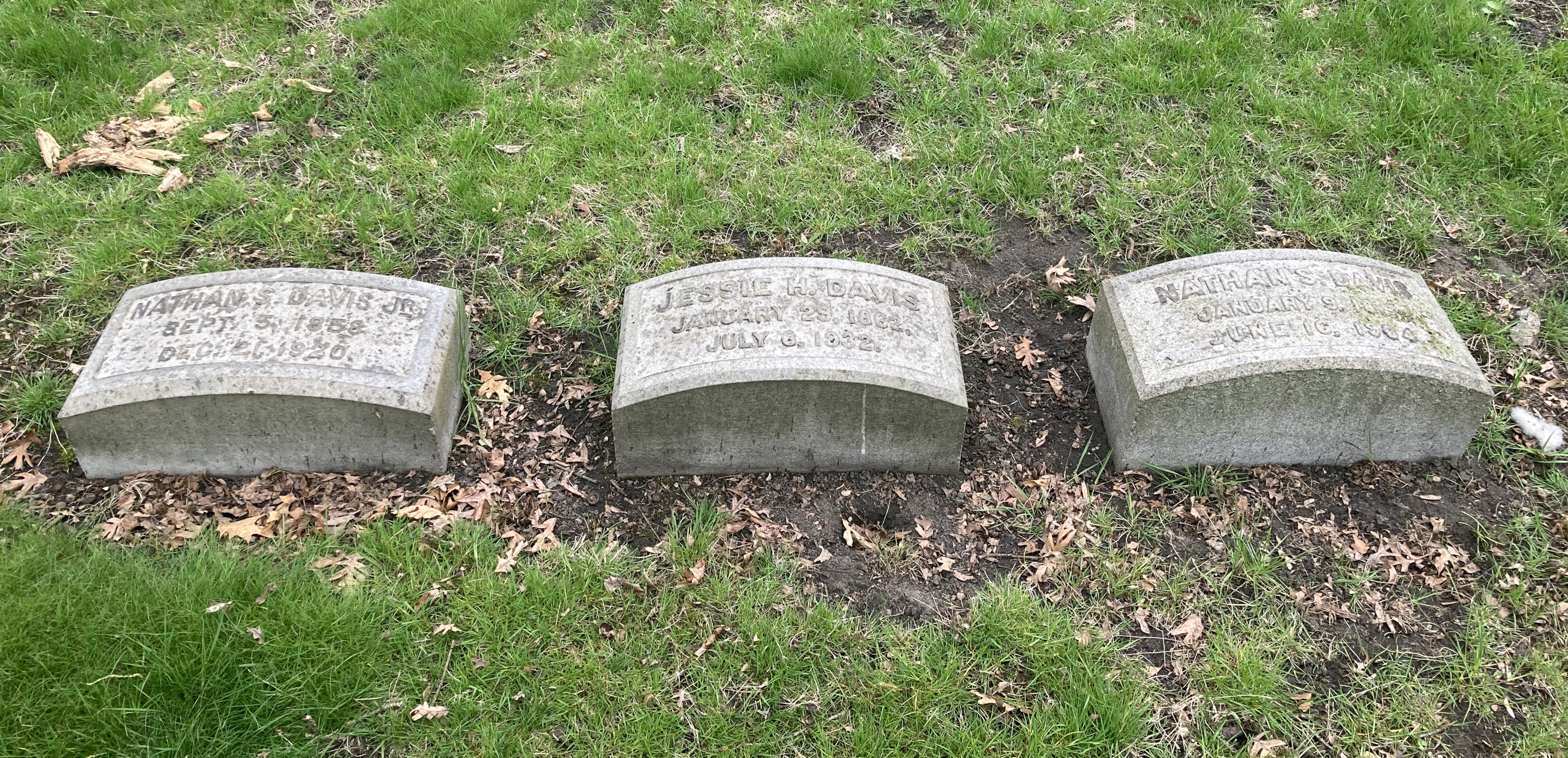
Graves of Nathan Smith Davis Jr. (left) and Sr. (right) at Rosehill Cemetery

Davis was a voluminous writer. Among his chief contributions to the medical literature are his "Principles and Practice of Medicine", "Medical Education and Reform", "Verdict of Science Concerning the Effects of Alcohol on Man", and "Clinical Lectures". In 1876 he was first attacked by a prostatic disease, from which he suffered until his death. On June 5, 1904, he was taken ill, showing signs of uremic poisoning. Up to within one hour of his death he talked clearly and well. He died in Chicago on June 16, quietly and without pain. He was buried at Rosehill Cemetery.

Davis's son and grandson of the same name themselves became physicians.
