= Filmography of Wallace Beery =

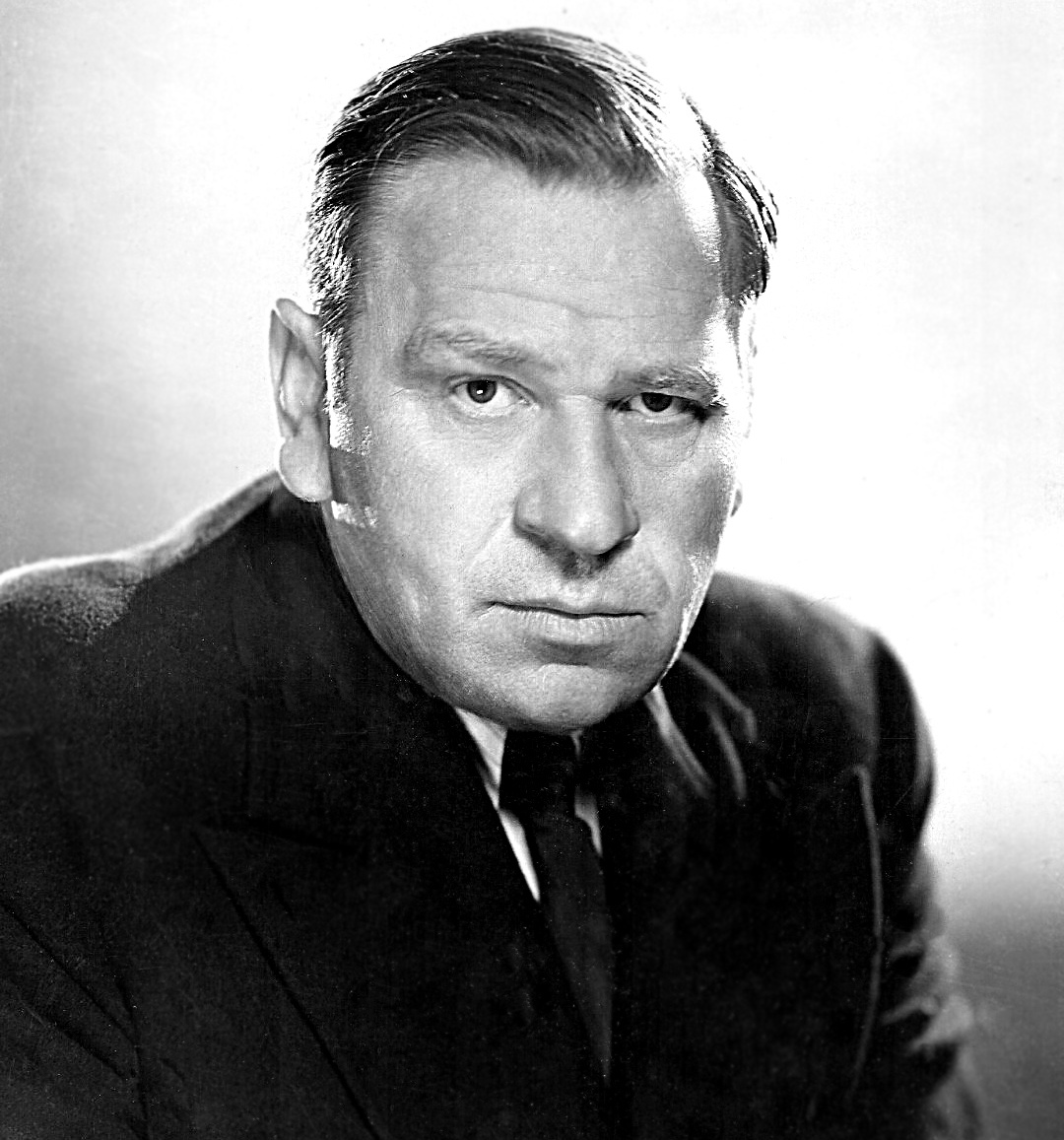
Wallace Beery

This is the filmography of Wallace Beery, a popular American film actor of the 1920s, 1930s and 1940s. Beery started his career in silent films in 1914, moving from 10-minute short films to supporting roles, then lead roles, in silent full-length feature films. From 1925 to 1929, he was under a contract with Paramount Pictures.

With the onset of sound films in 1929, Beery worked for MGM Pictures, first in supporting roles, then exclusively in lead roles. Beery appeared in numerous comedies, dramas, westerns. He frequently portrayed a rough, loud character who was secretly a good person; many of his co-stars were child actors.

== Silent films ==
=== 1914 to 1919 ===
During this era, Beery began his film career in silent short films, usually about ten-minutes long. Towards the end of the decade, he was being cast in supporting roles in silent feature films. In 1914 and 1915, he worked exclusively for Essanay Studios; for the rest of the decade, he appeared in films for multiple film production companies. Beery's early short films were all comedies, but his feature films covered diverse film genres.

Film	Genre	Wallace Beery Role	Studio	Co-stars	Notes
1914
His Athletic Wife	Comedy	Mr. Strong	Essanay Studios		First short film
Sweedie films	Comedies	Sweedie the Swedish maid	Essanay Studios	Gloria Swanson, Ben Turpin	Series of 29 short films
In and Out	Comedy	Hans	Essanay Studios		short films
The Ups and Downs	Western		Essanay Studios		short films
1915
Cheering a Husband			Essanay Studios		short films
Madame Double X	Comedy	Madame Double X	Essanay Studios	Ben Turpin	
Ain't It the Truth	Comedy	Donald Welling	Essanay Studios		
Two Hearts That Beat as Ten	Comedy	Fred	Essanay Studios	Ben Turpin	
The Fable of the Roistering Blades	Adventure	Mitt	Essanay Studios		Short film series
The Slim Princess	Comedy	Popova	Essanay Studios	Francis X. Bushman	First full-length feature film, supporting role.
The Broken Pledge	Comedy	Percy	Essanay Studios	Gloria Swanson	Feature film, lead role
1916
A Dash of Courage	Comedy	Police chief	Triangle Film	Gloria Swanson	Feature film, supporting role
The Janitor's Vacation					
1917
The Little American	War drama	A German soldier	Artcraft Pictures	Mary Pickford	Feature film, supporting role
Maggie's First False Step	Comedy	The villain	Triangle Distributing		Short films
Teddy at the Throttle	Comedy	Henry Black	Triangle Distributing	Gloria Swanson	Short films
Cactus Nell	Drama	A polished gent	Triangle Distributing		Short films
Are Waitresses Safe?	Comedy	Party guest	Paramount Pictures	Ben Turpin	Short films
1918					
Johanna Enlists	Comedy	Colonel Roberts	Paramount Pictures	Mary Pickford	Feature film, supporting role
1919
The Unpardonable Sin	Drama	Colonel Klemm	World Pictures		Feature films, supporting roles
The Love Burglar	Drama	Coast-to-Coast Taylor	Paramount Pictures		Feature films, supporting roles
Behind the Door	War drama	Lieutenant Brandt	Paramount Pictures		Feature films, supporting roles
Victory	Action	August Schomberg	Paramount-Artcraft	Lon Chaney	Feature films, supporting roles
The Life Line	Drama	Bos	Famous Players–Lasky		Feature films, supporting roles
Soldiers of Fortune	Drama	Mendoza	Realart Pictures		Feature film, lead role
The Lone Wolf's Daughter	Crime drama		W. W. Hodkinson Corporation		Feature films, supporting role
Only a Janitor	Comedy		Universal		Short film

=== Silent films 1920 to 1924 ===
During the early 1920s, Beery was appearing mainly in feature films, primarily in supporting roles.

Film	Genre	Wallace Beery Role	Studio	Co-stars	Notes
1920
813	Mystery	Major Parbury / Ribeira	Robertson-Cole Pictures		supporting roles
The Virgin of Stamboul	Adventure	Ahmed Hamid	Universal Pictures		supporting roles
The Mollycoddle	Adventure	Henry von Holkar	United Artists	Douglas Fairbanks	supporting roles
The Round-Up	Western	Buck McKee	Famous Players–Lasky	Fatty Arbuckle	supporting roles
The Last of the Mohicans	Historical drama	Magua	Associated Producers		supporting roles
The Rookie's Return	Comedy	François Dupont	Paramount Pictures		supporting roles
1921
The Policeman and the Baby	Drama				Short films, supporting role
The Last Trail	Western	William Kirk	Fox Film Corporation	Tom Mix	Short films, supporting role
The Four Horsemen of the Apocalypse	War drama	Lieut. Col. von Richthosen	Metro Pictures	Rudolph Valentino	Feature films, supporting roles
A Tale of Two Worlds	Drama	Ling Jo	Goldwyn Pictures		Feature films, supporting roles
Sleeping Acres				Snowy Baker.	Feature films, supporting roles
Wild Honey	Adventure	Buck Roper	Universal Pictures	Noah Beery	Feature films, supporting roles
The Golden Snare	Drama	Bram Johnson	Associated First National		Feature films, supporting roles
I Am the Law	Drama	Fu Chang	Affiliated Distributors	Noah Beery	Feature films, supporting roles
1922
The Patsy	Comedy	Gustave Ludermann	Truart Film Corporation	ZaSu Pitts	
Robin Hood	Historical drama	King Richard III	United Artists	Douglas Fairbanks	Supporting roles
A Blind Bargain	Horro	Ape man	Goldwyn Pictures	Lon Chaney	Supporting roles
The Rosary	Drama	Kenwood Wright	Associated First National		Supporting roles
Hurricane's Gal	Adventure	Chris Borg	Associated First National		Supporting roles
Trouble	Comedy	Ed Lee, the Plumber	Associated First National	Jackie Coogan	Supporting roles
Wild Honey	Adventure	Buck Roper	Universal Film	Noah Beery	Supporting roles
The Man from Hell's River	Western	Gaspard, the wolf	Western Pictures	Rin Tin Tin	Supporting roles
The Sagebrush Trail	Western	José Fagaro	Western Pictures		Supporting roles
Only a Shop Girl	Drama	Jim Brennan	CBC Film Sales		Supporting roles
1923
The Spanish Dancer	Historical drama	King Philip IV	Paramount Pictures		Supporting roles
Stormswept	Drama	Shark Moran	FBO Pictures Corp		Supporting roles
Ashes of Vengeance	Drama	Duc de Tours	First National Pictures	Norma Talmudge	Supporting roles
The Flame of Life	Drama	Dan Lowrie	Universal Pictures		Supporting roles
Drifting	Drama	Jules Repin	Universal Pictures		Supporting roles
Three Ages	Comedy	The villain	Metro Pictures	Buster Keaton	Supporting roles
The Eternal Struggle	Drama	Barode Dukane	Metro Pictures		Supporting roles
White Tiger	Crime drama	Count Donelli/Hawkes	Universal Pictures		Supporting roles
The Drums of Jeopardy	Mystery	Gregor Karlov	Truart Film		Supporting roles
Richard the Lion-Hearted	Historical drama	King Richard III	Associated Authors		First lead role
Bavu	Drama	Felix Bavu	Universal Pictures		Lead role
1924
Unseen Hands	Horror	Jean Scholast	Associated Exhibitors		Lead role
The Sea Hawk	Adventure	Captain Jasper Leigh	Associate First National Pictures		supporting roles
So Big	Drama	Klaus Poole	Associate First National Pictures		supporting roles
The Signal Tower	Drama	Joe Standish	Universal Pictures		supporting roles
Another Man's Wife	Drama	Captain Wolf	Producers Distributing		supporting roles
The Red Lily	Drama	Bo-Bo	Metro-Goldwyn	Ramon Novarro	supporting roles
Dynamite Smith	Drama	"Slugger" Rourke	Pathe Exchange		supporting roles
Madonna of the Streets	Drama	Bill Smythe	First National Pictures		supporting roles

=== 1925 to 1929 ===
Beery in 1925 signed an exclusive contract with Paramount Pictures to appear in supporting and lead roles in its silent films. Many of these films were comedies, but he also appeared in dramas, adventure films and war films. With the advent of sound films in 1929, Paramount fired Beery, along with other silent film actors.

Film	Genre	Wallace Beery Role	Studio	Co-stars	Notes
1925
The Lost World	Adventure	Professor Challenger	First National Pictures		Supporting roles
Adventure	Drama	Morgan	Paramount Pictures		Supporting roles
The Devil's Cargo	Drama	Ben	Paramount Pictures		Lead role
The Night Club	Comedy	Josy	Paramount Pictures		supporting roles
The Pony Express	Western	Rhode Island Red	Paramount Pictures		supporting roles
The Wanderer	Drama	Pharis	Paramount Pictures		supporting roles
Coming Through	Drama	Joe Lawler	Paramount Pictures		supporting roles
In the Name of Love	Comedy	Glavis	Paramount Pictures		supporting roles
Rugged Water	Drama	Captain Bartlett	Paramount Pictures		supporting roles
Let Women Alone	Comedy	Cap Bullwinkle	Producers Distributing	Pat O'Malley	supporting roles
The Great Divide	Drama	Dutch	MGM		supporting roles
1926
Behind the Front	War comedy	Riff Swanson	Paramount Pictures		supporting roles
Volcano!	Drama	Quembo	Paramount Pictures		supporting roles
Old Ironsides	Historical war drama	The Bos'n	Paramount Pictures	Boris Karloff, George Bancroft	supporting roles
We're in the Navy Now	Comedy	'Knockout' Hansen	Paramount Pictures		Lead role
1927
Casey at the Bat	Sports drama	Casey	Paramount Pictures	ZaSu Pitts, Stanley Holloway	Lead roles
Fireman, Save My Child	Comedy	Elmer	Paramount Pictures		Lead roles
Two Flaming Youths	Comedy	Gabby Gilfoil	Paramount Pictures		Supporting role
Now We're in the Air	War comedy	Wally	Paramount Pictures	Louise Brooks	Supporting role
1928
Beggars of Life	Drama	Oklahoma Red	Paramount Pictures	Louise Brooks	Lead roles
Partners in Crime	Comedy	Detective Mike Doolan	Paramount Pictures	William Powell	Lead roles
Wife Savers	Comedy	Louis Hosenozzle	Paramount Pictures	ZaSu Pitts	Lead roles
The Big Killing	Comedy	Powderhorn Pete	Paramount Pictures		Lead roles
1929
Chinatown Nights	Drama	Chuck Riley	Paramount Pictures		Lead role, silent film with sound added later
Stairs of Sand	Western	Lacey	Paramount Pictures	Jean Arthur	Lead role
The River of Romance	Drama	General Orlando Jackson	Paramount Pictures		Supporting role

== Sound films ==
=== 1930 to 1940 ===
After leaving Paramount, Beery in 1930 signed an exclusive contract with MGM, remaining with them for the rest of his film career. MGM loaned him to 20th Century and 20th Century Fox for two films. Most of his roles in the 1930s were lead roles in a wide variety of films.

Film	Genre	Wallace Beery Role	Studio	Co-stars	Notes
1930
The Big House	Drama	Butch	MGM	Robert Montgomery	Supporting roles
Billy the Kid	Western	Pat Garrett	MGM		Supporting roles
Way for a Sailor	Drama	Tripod	MGM	John Gilbert	Supporting roles
A Lady's Morals	Biography	P.T. Barnum	MGM		Supporting roles
Min and Bill	Comedy	Bill	MGM	Marie Dressler	Lead roles
1931
The Stolen Jools	Comedy		Paramount Pictures	Multiple actors	20-minute short film for charity
The Secret Six	Gangster drama	Louis 'Slaughterhouse' Scorpio	MGM	Jean Harlow, Clark Gable	Lead role
The Champ	Drama	Andy "Champ" Purcell	MGM	Jackie Cooper	Lead role, won Best Actor Oscar for role
1932
Hell Divers	Drama	C.P.O. H.W. "Windy" Riker	MGM	Clark Gable	Lead role
Grand Hotel	Drama	General Director Preysing	MGM	Joan Crawford, John Barrymore, Greta Garbo	Supporting role
Flesh	Drama	Polakai	MGM		Lead role
1933
The Bowery	Comedy	Chuck Connors	20th Century Studios (on loan)	George Raft, Jackie Cooper, Faye Wray	Lead roles
Dinner at Eight	Comedy	Dan Packard	MGM	Marie Dressler, John Barrymore, Jean Harlow	Lead roles
Tugboat Annie	Comedy	Terry Brennan	MGM	Marie Dressler, Robert Young, Maureen O'Sullivan	Lead roles
1934
Viva Villa!	Biography	Pancho Villa		Faye Wray	Lead roles
Treasure Island	Drama	Long John Silver	MGM	Jackie Cooper, Lionel Barrymore	Lead roles
The Mighty Barnum	Biography	P.T. Barnum	MGM	Adolphe Menjou	Lead roles
1935					
West Point of the Air	Drama	"Big Mike" Stone	MGM	Rosalind Russell, Robert Young, Maureen O'Sullivan	Lead role
China Seas	Adventure	Jamesy McArdle	MGM	Clark Gable, Jean Harlow	Supporting role
O'Shaughnessy's Boy	Drama	Windy O'Shaughnessy	MGM	Jackie Cooper	Lead role
Ah, Wilderness!	Comedy	Sidney Miller	MGM	Lionel Barrymore, Mickey Rooney	Lead role
1936
A Message to Garcia	Spy adventure	Sergeant Dory	20th Century Fox (on loan)	Barbara Stanwix	Lead role
Old Hutch	Comedy	Hutch Hutchins	MGM		Lead role
1937
The Good Old Soak	Drama	Clem Hawley	MGM	Betty Furness, Margaret Hamilton	Lead role
The Bad Man of Brimstone	Western	"Trigger" Bill	MGM	Dennis O'Keefe	Lead role
Slave Ship	Adventure	Jim Lovett	MGM	Mickey Rooney	Lead role
1938
Port of Seven Seas	Drama	Cesar	MGM	Frank Morgan	Lead roles
Stablemates	Sports drama	Doc Tom Terry	MGM	Mickey Rooney	Lead roles
1939
Stand Up and Fight	Western	Starkey	MGM	Charles Bickford, Robert Taylor	Lead role
Sergeant Madden	Police drama	Sergeant Madden	MGM		Lead role
Thunder Afloat	War drama	Pop Thorson	MGM	Chester Morris	Lead role

=== 1940 to 1949 ===
During the last decade of Beery's film career, he worked exclusively for MGM in lead roles. He reduced his workload during the 1940s, leading up to his final film. He died three days after its release in 1949.

Film	Genre	Wallace Beery Role	Studio	Co-stars	Notes
1940
The Man from Dakota	Historical drama	Bar Barstow	MGM	Dolores Del Rio	Lead roles for Beery
20 Mule Team	Western	Skinner Bill	MGM	Anne Baxter, Noah Beery Jr.	Lead roles for Beery
Wyoming	Western	"Reb" Harkness	MGM	Marjorie Main	Lead roles for Beery
1941
The Bad Man	Western	Pancho Lopez	MGM	Ronald Reagan, Lionel Barrymore	Lead roles
Barnacle Bill	Comedy	Bill Johansen	MGM	Marjorie Main	Lead roles
1942
The Bugle Sounds	War drama	First Sergeant Patrick Aloysius 'Hap' Doan	MGM	Donna Reed, George Bancroft	Lead roles
Jackass Mail	Western comedy	Marmaduke 'Just' Baggot	MGM	Marjorie Main	Lead roles
1943
Salute to the Marines	War drama	Sergeant Major William Bailey	MGM	Noah Berry	Lead role
1944
Rationing	Comedy	Ben Barton	MGM	Marjorie Main	Lead Roles
Barbary Coast Gent	Western comedy	Honest Plush Brannon	MGM	Chill Wills, John Carradine, Noah Berry	Lead Roles
1945
This Man's Navy	War drama	Ned Trumpet	MGM	Noah Berry	Lead role
1946
Bad Bascomb	Western	Zed Bascomb	MGM	Margaret O'Brien	Lead role
1947
The Mighty McGurk	Drama	Roy "Slag" McGurk	MGM	Dean Stockwell, Edward Arnold, Cameron Mitchell	Lead roles
Alias a Gentleman	Romantic comedy	Jim Breedin	MGM	Sheldon Leonard	Lead roles
1949					
A Date with Judy	Musical comedy	Melvin Colner Foster	MGM	Elizabeth Taylor, Jane Powell	Lead role
Big Jack	Western	Big Jack Horner	MGM	Marjorie Main, Edward Arnold	Lead role, last film of career

== See also ==
- Wallace Beery
- Silent films
- Lists of Metro-Goldwyn-Mayer films
