= We're in the Navy Now =

1926 film by A. Edward Sutherland

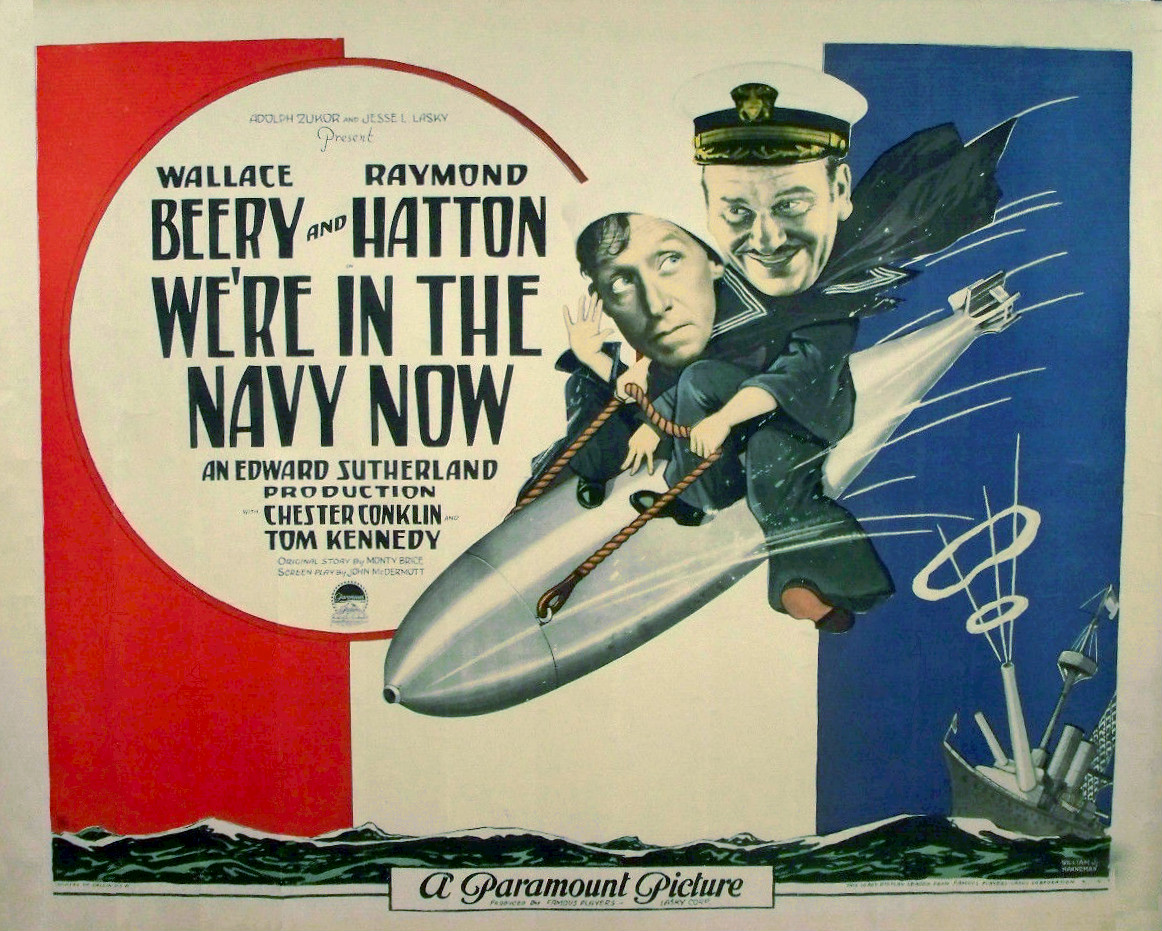
- Lobby card
- Directed by: A. Edward Sutherland
- Written by: Monty Brice (story); John McDermott; George Marion, Jr. (titles)
- Produced by: Adolph Zukor; Jesse Lasky
- Cinematography: Charles P. Boyle
- Distributed by: Paramount Pictures
- Release date: November 6, 1926
- Running time: 66 minutes
- Country: United States
- Language: Silent (English intertitles)

We're in the Navy Now is a 1926 American silent comedy film directed by A. Edward Sutherland and starring Wallace Beery and Raymond Hatton. An abridged version of the film survives in the Library of Congress.

Beery and Hatton previously appeared as a comedy team in Sutherland's Behind the Front and are reunited here. The "Beery and Hatton" part-time comedy team made four films together, including Fireman, Save My Child and Now We're in the Air with Louise Brooks.

== Plot ==
Wallace Beery as Knockout Hansen

In 1917, just after the American entry into World War I, Knockout Hansen is a professional boxer, managed by Stinky Smith. Knockout loses a fight to Sailor Percival Scruggs after being knocked out. After the fight, Stinky steals the prize money and runs out of the arena. Knockout follows Stinky, finally catching him near a US Navy recruiting station during a parade. Somehow, Stinky and Knockout end up drafted into the Navy.

Stinky and Knockout are assigned to a ship in a convoy under the command of a Captain Smithers. After causing some comedic mayhem on the ship, both men are thrown into the brig. To their dismay, they discover that Scruggs, now in the Navy himself, is the master-at-arms.

The ship is cruising in the Atlantic Ocean when it enters an area full of naval mines. Madelyn Phillips induces Stinky and Knockout to take her over the side in a lifeboat so she can conduct some secret mission. After Madelyn miraculously disappears, their boat is run down accidentally by a French dreadnaught. Stinky and Knockout are rescued, but the convoy is attacked by German U-boats. However, Stinky and Knockout manage to accidentally save their ship from sinking. When the war ends in 1919, the Navy awards Madelyn a medal for her service. Stinky and Knockout receive honorable discharges. Now out of military service, the two men go back to boxing. Knockout finally beats Scruggs in a boxing match.

== Cast ==
- Wallace Beery as 'Knockout' Hansen
- Raymond Hatton as 'Stinky' Smith
- Chester Conklin as Capital Smithers
- Tom Kennedy as Sailor Percival Scruggs
- Donald Keith as ship's radio officer
- Lorraine Eason as Madelyn Phillips
- Joseph W. Girard as an admiral
- Max Asher as Admiral Puckerlip

== See also ==
Filmography of Wallace Beery
