= Wanderer of the Wasteland (1924 film) =

1924 film

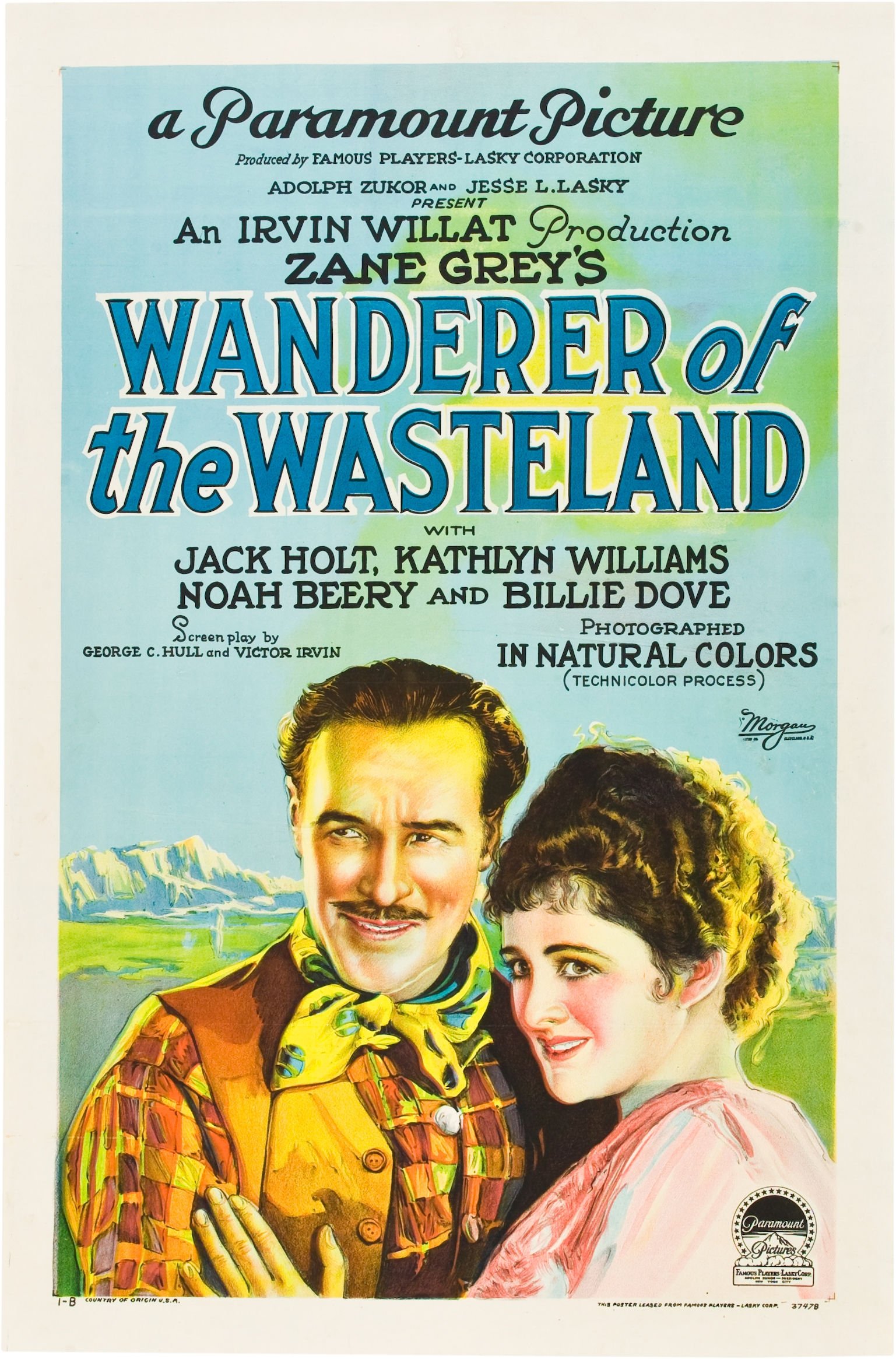
- Theatrical release poster, likenesses of Jack Holt and Billie Dove
- Directed by: Irvin Willat
- Written by: George C. Hull; Victor Irvin
- Based on: Wanderer of the Wasteland by Zane Grey
- Produced by: Lucien Hubbard
- Starring: Jack Holt; Noah Beery; Billie Dove
- Cinematography: Arthur Ball
- Production company: Famous Players–Lasky
- Distributed by: Paramount Pictures
- Release date: June 21, 1924 (US)
- Running time: 60 minutes
- Country: United States
- Languages: Silent; English intertitles

Wanderer of the Wasteland is a 1924 American silent Western film directed by Irvin Willat and starring Jack Holt, Noah Beery, and Billie Dove. It was the second feature film to be photographed entirely in two-color Technicolor.

== Plot ==
The film is based on Zane Grey's 1923 novel of two brothers, one an honest cowpoke, the other a gambler. When Adam Larey confronts his younger brother Guerd about his gambling addiction, the latter is accidentally shot. A distraught Adam, believing he has killed his own brother, flees into the desert. He later learns that Guerd was merely wounded and returns to the loving arms of beautiful Ruth Virey.

== Cast ==
- Jack Holt as Adam Larey
- Noah Beery as Dismukes
- George Irving as Mr. Roderick Virey
- Kathlyn Williams as Magdalene Virey
- Billie Dove as Ruth Virey
- Jim Mason as Guerd Larey (credited as James Mason)
- Richard Neill as Collishaw (credited as Richard R. Neill)
- James Gordon as Alex MacKay
- William A. Carroll as Merryvale (credited as William Carroll)
- Willard Cooley as Camp Doctor

== Production ==
Paramount Pictures decided to make a picture entirely in Technicolor (an early version known as Process 2) following the success of the Technicolor sequences in the film The Ten Commandments (1923) and director Irvin Willat's own Heritage of the Desert (1924). Production began on January 24, 1924, and wrapped on March 9. Location shooting for the film included setting up "tent cities" in remote parts of Arizona, Nevada and California, and the production crew worked without being able to watch dailies.

== Preservation status ==
In February of 2021, Wanderer of the Wasteland was cited by the National Film Preservation Board on their Lost U.S. Silent Feature Films list and is therefore presumed lost.

An original cemented Technicolor print survived into the 1960s in the hands of the film's director, Irvin Willat, who reported in 1971 that the 35 mm nitrate film had decomposed.

After Willat's death, his daughter mentioned that she remembered the day when he discovered that Wanderer of the Wasteland had decomposed. She said he went upstairs to his bedroom, closed the door and cried for three hours. His former wife, Billie Dove, starred in the picture, and he had never really come to terms with their separation after she left him for Howard Hughes.

== See also ==
- List of early color feature films
