= Coming Through =

Coming Through may refer to:

- Coming Through (1925 film), an American silent drama film
- Coming Through (1985 film), a British historical drama film
