= Irvin Willat =

American film director

Irvin V. Willat
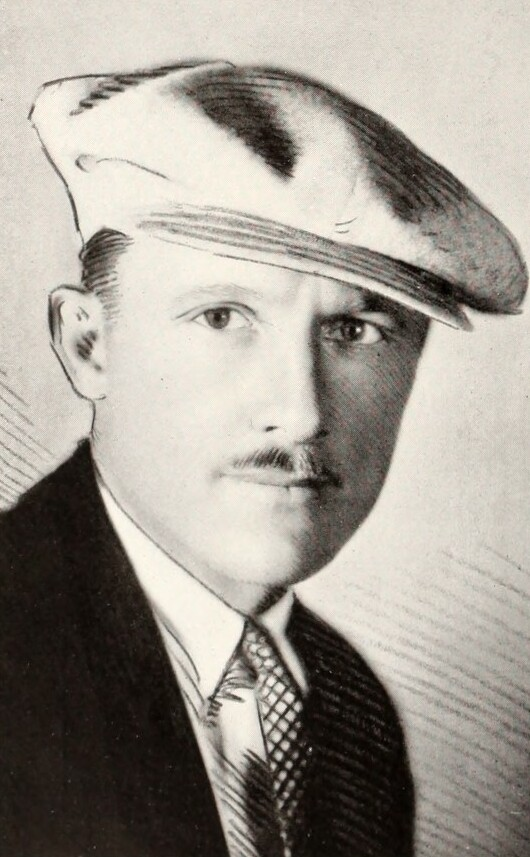
- Willat in 1920
- Born: November 18, 1890; Stamford, Connecticut, US
- Died: April 17, 1976 (aged 85); Santa Monica, California, US
- Occupation: Film director
- Years active: 1917–1937
- Spouse: Billie Dove (m.1923-1929; divorced)

Irvin V. Willat (November 18, 1890 – April 17, 1976) was an American film director of the silent film era. He directed 39 films between 1917 and 1937. Early in his career Willat worked as a cinematographer on several films. His older brother Edwin Willat (1882–1950) was cinematographer on several silent films.

== Partial filmography ==
- Uncle Tom's Cabin (1914), cinematographer
- In Slumberland (1917), debut as director
- The Guilty Man (1918)
- The Law of the North (1918)
- The False Faces (1919)
- Rustling a Bride (1919)
- A Daughter of the Wolf (1919)
- The Grim Game (1919)
- Behind the Door (1919)
- Below the Surface (1920)
- Down Home (1920)
- Partners of the Tide (1921)
- Fifty Candles (1921)
- The Face of the World (1921)
- The Siren Call (1922)
- On the High Seas (1922)
- Pawned (1922)
- All the Brothers Were Valiant (1923)
- Fog Bound (1923)
- Three Miles Out (1924)
- Heritage of the Desert (1924)
- Wanderer of the Wasteland (1924)
- The Story Without a Name (1924)
- North of 36 (1924)
- The Air Mail (1925)
- Rugged Water (1925)
- The Ancient Highway (1925)
- The Enchanted Hill (1926)
- Paradise (1926)
- Back to God's Country (1927)
- The Cavalier (1928)
- The Michigan Kid (1928)
- The Isle of Lost Ships (1929)
- Old Louisiana (1937)
- Luck of Roaring Camp (1937)
- Under Strange Flags (1937)
