= Lila Lee =

Prominent screen actress of the early silent film era

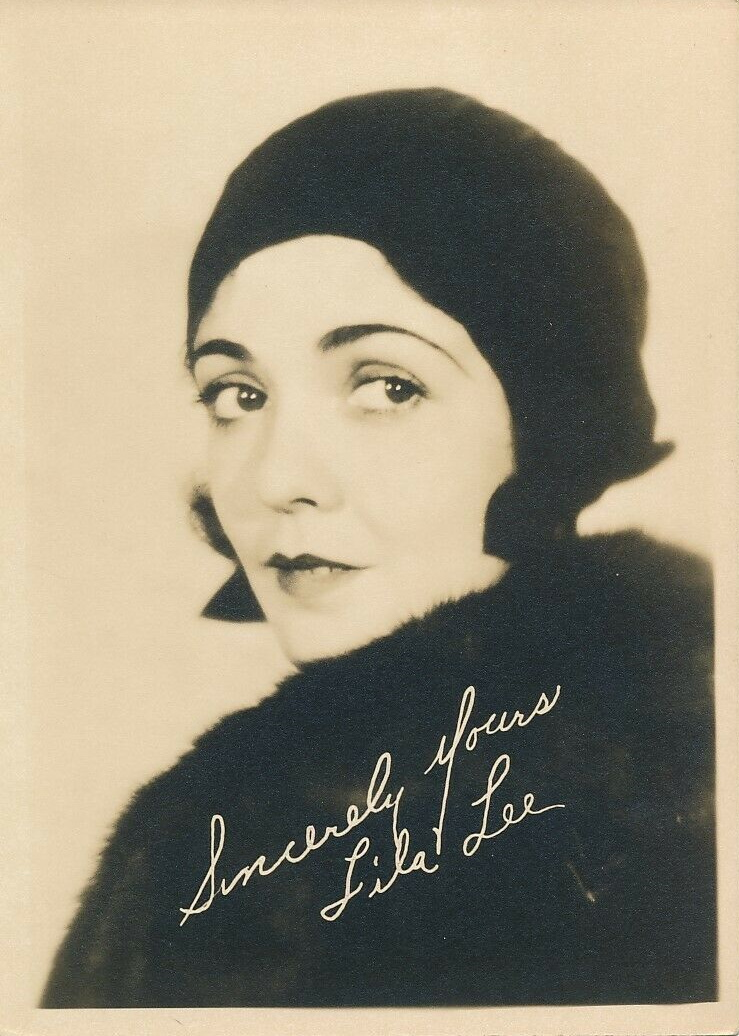
- Lee c. mid-1920s
- Born: Augusta Wilhelmena Fredericka Appel; July 25, 1905; Union Hill, New Jersey, U.S.
- Died: November 13, 1973 (aged 68); Saranac Lake, New York, U.S.
- Occupation: Actress
- Years active: 1918–1967
- Spouses: James Kirkwood, Sr. (m. 1923; div. 1931) Jack R. Peine (m. 1934; div. 1935) John E. Murphy (m. 1944; div. 1949)
- Partner(s): John Farrow (1928–1933); Reid Russell (1935–1936, his death)
- Children: James Kirkwood Jr.

Signature
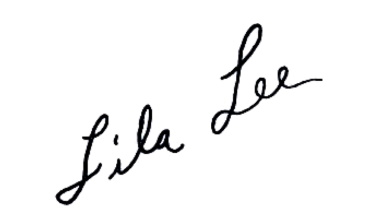

Lila Lee (born Augusta Wilhelmena Fredericka Appel; July 25, 1905 – November 13, 1973) was a prominent screen actress, primarily a leading lady, of the silent film and early sound film eras.

== Early life ==
The daughter of Augusta Fredericka Appel and Carl Appel, Lee was born Augusta Wilhelmena Fredericka Appel on July 25, 1905, in Union Hill, New Jersey (now part of Union City), into a middle-class family of German immigrants who relocated to New York City. She had an older sister, Pauline ("Peggy"), who was born in Hamburg, Germany.

Searching for a hobby for their gregarious young daughter, the Appels enrolled Lila in Gus Edwards' kiddie review shows where she was given the nickname of "Cuddles"; a name that she would be known by for the rest of her acting career. Her stagework became so popular with the public that her parents had her educated with private tutors. Edwards would become Lee's long-term manager.

Lillian Edwards, wife of Gus Edwards, was Lee's guardian. When Lee was 15 years old, she went to court seeking an injunction to prevent Mrs. Edwards "from collecting any money for Lila's services." Mrs. Edwards countered that she had spent 10 years helping to shape Lee's career and had invested money in her.

== Career ==
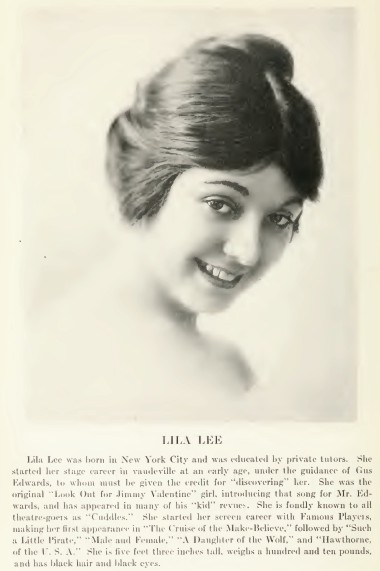
Lila Lee in Who's Who on the Screen, 1920

Lee performed in vaudeville for eight years. In 1918, she was chosen for a film contract by Hollywood film mogul Jesse Lasky for Famous Players–Lasky Corporation, which later became Paramount Pictures. Her first feature The Cruise of the Make-Believes garnered the thirteen-year-old starlet much public acclaim and Lasky quickly sent Lee on an arduous publicity campaign. Critics lauded Lila for her wholesome persona and sympathetic character parts. Lee quickly rose to the ranks of leading lady and often starred opposite such matinee heavies as Conrad Nagel, Gloria Swanson, Wallace Reid, Roscoe "Fatty" Arbuckle, and Rudolph Valentino. Lee bore more than a slight resemblance to Ann Little, a former Paramount star and frequent Reid co-star who was leaving the film business and at this stage in her career an even stronger resemblance to Marguerite Clark.

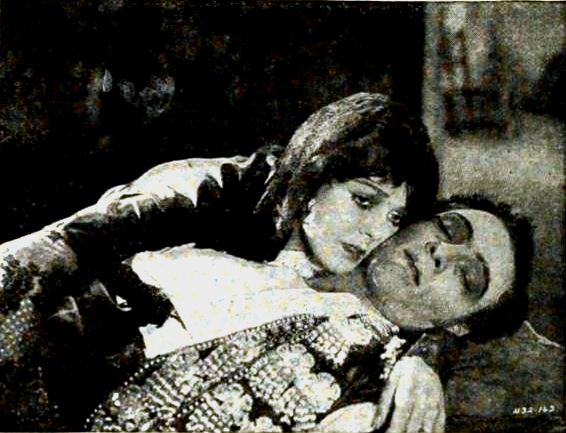
Lee and Valentino in Blood and Sand, 1922

In 1922, Lee was cast as Carmen in the popular film Blood and Sand. She played opposite matinee idol Rudolph Valentino and silent screen vamp Nita Naldi. Lee subsequently won the first WAMPAS Baby Stars award that year and continued to be a highly popular leading lady throughout the 1920s, during which she made scores of critically-praised and widely-watched films.

As the Roaring Twenties drew to a close, Lee's popularity began to wane and she positioned herself for the transition to talkies. She is one of the few leading ladies of the silent screen whose popularity did not nosedive with the coming of sound. She went back to working with the major studios and appeared, most notably, in The Unholy Three, in 1930, opposite Lon Chaney Sr. in his only talkie. However, a series of bad career choices and bouts of recurring tuberculosis and alcoholism hindered further projects and Lee was relegated to taking parts in mostly grade B-movies.

After the Reid Russell scandal in 1936, Lee's career was completely over. She would not act in another film until 1967's Cottonpickin' Chickenpickers, which was also her final film.

== Personal life ==
Lee was married and divorced three times. Her first husband, almost 30 years her senior, was actor James Kirkwood, Sr., whom she married on July 26, 1923. They had met on the set of Ebb Tide in 1922. Kirkwood filed for divorce in May 1930 on grounds of her desertion; the divorce was finalized in August 1931. Lee and Kirkwood had a son in 1924, James Kirkwood, Jr. ("Jimmy"), whose custody was granted to his father; he became a highly regarded playwright and screenwriter whose works include A Chorus Line and P.S. Your Cat Is Dead. Kirkwood Jr. was primarily raised by Lee's family in Elyria, Ohio.

In her autobiography, Lee revealed she lost her virginity to Kirkwood before they were married and she fell pregnant as a result. Kirkwood ultimately arranged an abortion for her, and their relationship continued after this only because Kirkwood threatened to tell Lee's mother of their premarital relations.

In June 1928, Lee began an affair with John Farrow while Kirkwood was in London. Lee wrote Kirkwood stating she wanted a divorce, and in late September of that year, the two formally separated. Lee decided not to fight for custody of their son because Kirkwood threatened to kill Farrow, Lee, their son, and himself. After their divorce, Lee traveled to Arizona and stayed in a sanitarium. Lee also became engaged to John Farrow, but they separated in 1933 after Lee discovered he was being unfaithful to her. He would go on to marry Maureen O'Sullivan in 1936.

At the beginning of her career, Lee dated Charlie Chaplin. Leatrice Joy claimed Lee had an affair with John Gilbert while they were married.

Her second husband was broker Jack R. Peine, whom she married on December 8, 1934. In August 1934, Lee, Peine, and chauffeur George Morrison had been sued for $110,000 by Italian opera singer and voice teacher Emilio Staine, who claimed he had been struck by their car when crossing a street in Santa Monica, California. By July 2, 1935, the two had divorced. Lee claimed Peine was a drunk, a gambler, and a cheater. Shortly into their marriage, with Lee looking for a house for the two, Peine took off to Mexico and didn't return for a month.

In 1935, Lee began a relationship with car salesman Reid Russell. In 1936, Lee was living in California with her son James Jr, novelist Gouverneur Morris, and his wife Ruth (née Wightman), a screenwriter and racecar driver. Lee became engaged to Russell and planned to marry him once he obtained a divorce. On September 25, 1936, Russell's dead body was discovered outside on the hammock by Kirkwood Jr., and a scandal that would ultimately end Lee's career ensued.

Her third husband was broker John E. Murphy. According to author Sean Egan in the James Kirkwood biography Ponies & Rainbows (2011), Murphy's will left Lee at the financial mercy of his second wife, who consequently became the manipulative character Aunt Claire in P.S. Your Cat Is Dead, written by Lee's son, James Kirkwood, Jr.

=== Reid Russell scandal ===
Lila Lee began a relationship with car salesman Reid Russell in 1935. On September 25, 1936, Reid Russell's dead body was discovered outside on the hammock by Kirkwood Jr. (Ruth Morris would later claim it was she who discovered Russell's body). He had been shot in the head with a .32 caliber one or two days prior. The bullet had penetrated Russell's head and passed through; neither it nor its empty shell were ever found. The gun found in his hand was one he kept in his bureau drawer at home.

Following the discovery of Russell's body, his death was investigated and treated as a suicide, and Mr. and Mrs. Morris both said that he was suicidal and had made suicidal remarks after losing his job. Lee would later confirm he had threatened suicide on multiple occasions and that he talked about it incessantly.

On November 11, the Los Angeles Times reported that a woman had made a telephone threat towards Russell's mother, Victoria, urging her to stop pushing the investigation into her son's death. The case had recently been reopened after Victoria had a conference with the investigators.

Ruth told Lila that Reid had left a suicide note, but that she wasn't going to tell anyone about it. Lee went to the District Attorney's office to say that there was no suicide note; however, Morris backtracked and said that there was. Lee herself never read the note, but Morris read it to her and then burned it in an ashtray. Later in life, James Kirkwood Jr. would confide to a friend, William Russo, that there had been three suicide notes – one in Ruth Morris' jewel box and two within a newel post on the handrail of a set of stairs in the house. The two other notes were found after the case was closed.

Gouverneur Morris, his wife Ruth, and Lila Lee were questioned by authorities about the destruction of the suicide note. Mrs. Morris claimed she found the suicide note in a box on her dresser drawer two or three days after Russell's body was discovered. Because his death had already been declared a suicide, Morris decided to burn it. Gouverneur Morris added that neither he nor his wife heard the report of a gunshot neighbors recalled coming from the Morris home at about 9 P.M. on September 24, and that there had been no argument prior to Russell's death.

On November 17, the Los Angeles Times reported that Russell's body may be exhumed depending on the report of a ballistic expert who was trying to determine if the .32 caliber revolver found in his hand had been fired recently. The following day, it was reported that the exhumation would go ahead (as it could not be determined if the rusty gun had been fired recently). During this time, investigators began to doubt the suicide hypothesis, but still were not considering murder; rather, they questioned whether his death had occurred somewhere other than the outside hammock. Also on the 18th, the San Francisco Chronicle reported that Russell's mother Victoria claimed that four days before Russell's body was found, a woman had telephoned repeatedly asking for Russell and demanding to know where he was. Investigators were beginning to consider a "love slaying" theory. However, on November 19, his ex-wife told the Los Angeles Times that she believed Russell had killed himself. An entirely new theory was also introduced that day by The Examiner, which ran a story headed "Racketeering Ring Linked to Russell Case." The source for the information was Detective Lieutenant Harry Leslie Hansen of the Georgia Street Division, who was an old friend of Russell. The Los Angeles Times on the 20th reported that Hansen had told the District Attorney's office that Russell had said he was going to quit his automobile salesman's job to smuggle arms and ammunition to a foreign country (and that Russell had told Hansen this when the two had gone on a weekend party five days before his death). The same paper reported that a county autopsy on Russell's corpse confirmed the first autopsy's findings: the wound on Russell's temple was powder-marked and seared, indicating a self-inflicted wound and that the wound was too small to have been made by either .45 or .38 caliber weapons and too big for a .22, thus indicating that the .32 found in Russell's hand was indeed the cause of death.

On November 21, it was reported Russell's financial affairs were being looked into and that other authorities were beginning a search of automobiles used by Russell and a number of his friends for blood stains. The next day, the paper announced that the clothes Russell had been wearing when he died had been retrieved from his undertaker and that an important announcement may be made as a result of examining it. No such announcement was made, however, and on the 24th Gouverneur Morris said to the Times and the Chronicle that the entire investigation was ridiculous and foolish and that, "No matter how much they investigate they'll learn one thing – that is that the unfortunate young man killed himself. We have given officers the names of five people to whom Russell had declared he intended to commit suicide. I'm sick and tired of being hauled out of bed at all hours to answer questions I've already answered and if this thing continues I'll take legal action to stop the District Attorney's office from making a public show of me."

The 25th saw the Times carry a story titled "New Mystery Angles Enter Russell Death Case"; however, the article gave out very little information aside from the fact that law enforcement was looking at the status of Russell's bank account and the reason for his termination from his job. In addition, the gun was due to undergo tests to find out the atmospheric conditions to which it had been subjected.

On December 12, 1936, DA Buron Fitts closed the case on the grounds that "blood tests" had ruled out foul play. Fitts had been accused of accepting movie studio payoffs. Before the Reid Russell case, he had helped cover up the reasons for the death of Paul Bern, had allegedly been involved in dropping a statutory rape charge against a wealthy man (involving bribery), and had closed the murder case of William Desmond Taylor in 1922.

In the aftermath of the investigation, Gouverneur Morris got into a car accident (although he recovered and lived until 1953). Ruth Morris committed suicide in 1939.

In her autobiography, Lila Lee wrote, "They started digging around the place and they had found that our gardener had had relations with a sheep, had buried it. It was too silly to make the papers. The gardener had made a pass at Jimmy when he was alone in the house in the afternoon. He was gotten rid of but fast." She further wrote, "I think he [Reid Russell] committed suicide." However, Evan Rhodes wrote in his handwritten notes that Lee had said to him, "Do you want to know about the killing?...not the killing – the suicide."

== Health ==
In the 1930s, Lee was diagnosed with tuberculosis and briefly stayed at a sanitarium in Prescott, Arizona in 1933. She then moved to Saranac Lake, New York for treatment at the Will Rogers Memorial Hospital. Lee made several uneventful appearances in stage plays in the 1940s and starred in early television soap operas in the 1950s.

== Death ==
In 1973 Lee died of a stroke at Saranac Lake. She is buried at Brookdale Cemetery in Elyria, Ohio.

== Recognition ==
For her contribution as an actress in motion pictures, she was awarded a star on the Hollywood Walk of Fame at 1716 Vine Street. It was dedicated on February 8, 1960.

== Filmography ==
Features
Year	Title	Role	Notes
1918	The Cruise of the Make-Believes	Bessie Meggison	Lost film
1918	Such a Little Pirate	Patricia Wolf	Lost film
1919	Jane Goes A-Wooing		Lost film
1919	The Secret Garden	Mary Lennox	Lost film
1919	Puppy Love	Gloria O'Connell	Lost film
1919	Rustling a Bride	Emily	Lost film
1919	A Daughter of the Wolf	Annette Ainsworth	Lost film
1919	Rose o' the River	Rose Wiley	Lost film
1919	The Heart of Youth	Josephine Darchat	Lost film
1919	The Lottery Man	Polly	Lost film
1919	Hawthorne of the U.S.A.	Princess Irma	
1919	Male and Female	Tweeny – the Scullery Maid	
1920	Terror Island	Beverly West	Incomplete, five of seven reels are extant
1920	The Soul of Youth	Vera Hamilton	
1920	The Prince Chap	Claudia (age 18)	Lost film
1921	Midsummer Madness	Daisy Osborne	
1921	The Charm School	Elsie	Lost film
1921	The Easy Road	Ella Klotz	Lost film
1921	The Dollar-a-Year Man	Peggy Bruce	Lost film
1921	Gasoline Gus	Sal Jo Banty	
1921	Crazy to Marry	Annabelle Landis	
1921	After the Show	Eileen	Lost film
1922	Rent Free	Barbara Teller	Lost film
1922	One Glorious Day	Molly McIntyre	Lost film
1922	Is Matrimony a Failure?	Margaret Saxby	Lost film
1922	The Fast Freight	Elsie	Lost film
1922	The Dictator	Juanita	Lost film
1922	Blood and Sand	Carmen	
1922	The Ghost Breaker	Maria Theresa, a Spanish Heiress	Lost film
1922	Ebb Tide	Ruth Attwater	Lost film
1922	Back Home and Broke	Mary Thorne	Lost film
1922	A Trip to Paramountown	Herself	Short Subject
1923	The Ne'er-Do-Well	Chiquita	Lost film
1923	Homeward Bound	Mary Brent	Lost film
1923	Hollywood	Herself (cameo)	Lost film
1923	Woman-Proof	Louise Halliday	Lost film
1924	Love's Whirlpool	Molly	
1924	Wandering Husbands	Diana Moreland	
1924	Another Man's Wife	Helen Brand	Lost film
1925	The Midnight Girl	Anna	
1925	Coming Through	Alice Rand	Lost film
1925	Old Home Week	Ethel Harmon	
1926	Broken Hearts	Ruth Esterin	
1926	The New Klondike	Evelyn Lane	Incomplete film, with one reel missing
1926	Fascinating Youth	Lila Lee	Lost film
1927	One Increasing Purpose	Elizabeth Glade	Lost film
1927	Million Dollar Mystery	Florence Grey	
1928	Top Sergeant Mulligan	The girl	
1928	The Man in Hobbles	Ann Harris	
1928	You Can't Beat the Law	Patricia Berry	
1928	A Bit of Heaven	Fola Dale	Lost film
1928	Thundergod	Enid Bryant	
1928	United States Smith	Molly Malone	
1928	The Adorable Cheat	Marion Dorsey	
1928	Just Married	Victoire	Lost film
1928	Black Butterflies	Norma Davis	
1928	The Little Wild Girl	Marie Cleste	
1928	The Black Pearl	Eugenie Bromley	
1929	Queen of the Night Clubs	Bea Walters	Lost film
1929	Honky Tonk	Beth Leonard	Lost film
1929	Drag	Dot	
1929	Dark Streets	Katie Dean	Lost film
1929	The Argyle Case	Mary Morgan	Lost film
1929	Flight	Elinor Baring	
1929	Love, Live and Laugh	Margharita	
1929	Show of Shows	Performer in 'What Became of the Floradora Boys' Number	Technicolor version is lost
1929	The Sacred Flame	Stella Taylor	Lost film
1930	Second Wife	Florence Wendell Fairchild	
1930	Murder Will Out	Jeanne Baldwin	Lost film
1930	Those Who Dance	Nora Brady	
1930	Double Cross Roads	Mary Carlyle	
1930	The Unholy Three	Rosie	
1930	The Gorilla	Alice Denby	Lost film
1931	Woman Hungry	Judith Temple	
1931	Misbehaving Ladies	Princess Ellen	
1932	Unholy Love	Jane Bradford	
1932	Radio Patrol	Sue Kennedy	
1932	War Correspondent	Julie March	
1932	Exposure	Doris Corbin	
1932	The Night of June 13	Trudie Morrow	
1932	False Faces	Georgia Rand	
1932	Officer Thirteen	Doris Dane	
1933	Face in the Sky	Sharon Hadley	
1933	The Iron Master	Janet Stillman	
1933	The Intruder	Connie Wayne	
1933	Lone Cowboy	Eleanor Jones	
1934	Whirlpool	Helen Rankin Morrison	
1934	Stand Up and Cheer!	Zelda	Uncredited
1934	In Love with Life	Sharon	
1934	I Can't Escape	Mae Nichols	
1935	The Marriage Bargain	Helen Stanhope	
1935	The People's Enemy	Catherine Carr	
1935	Champagne for Breakfast	Natalie Morton	
1936	The Ex-Mrs. Bradford	Miss Prentiss, Bradford's Receptionist	
1936	Country Gentlemen	Mrs. Louise Heath	
1937	Two Wise Maids	Ethel Harriman	
1937	Nation Aflame	Mona Franklin Burtis	
1938	Oh Boy!		
1967	Cottonpickin' Chickenpickers	Viola Zickafoose	
