= Robert Bolder =

English actor

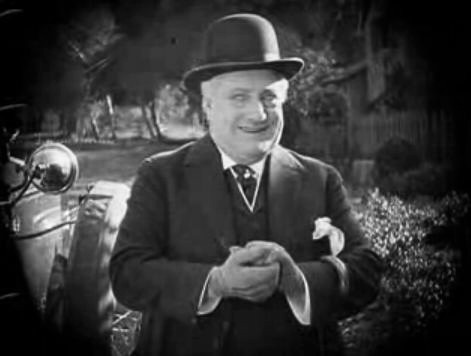
- Bolder in Beyond the Rocks (1922)
- Born: 20 July 1859; London, England
- Died: 10 December 1937 (aged 78); Los Angeles, California, USA
- Occupation: Actor
- Years active: 1912–1936

Robert Bolder (20 July 1859 – 10 December 1937) was an English film actor of the silent era. He appeared in more than 120 films between 1912 and 1936. He was born in London and died in Los Angeles, California. In the early part of the 20th-century Bolder was involved in several Broadway productions.

== Selected filmography ==
- His Athletic Wife (1913)
- Madame Double X (1914)
- One Wonderful Night (1914)
- The Fable of the Busy Business Boy and the Droppers-In (1914)
- Ain't It the Truth (1915)
- His New Job (1915)
- Two Hearts That Beat as Ten (1915)
- The Nick of Time Baby (1916)
- On Trial (1917)
- Sadie Goes to Heaven (1917)
- Upstairs (1919)
- A Gentleman of Quality (1919)
- Burning Daylight (1920)
- The Beggar Prince (1920)
- The Girl in Number 29 (1920)
- Sick Abed (1920)
- The Furnace (1920)
- Her Beloved Villain (1920)
- Black Beauty (1921)
- The Fighting Lover (1921)
- The Silent Call (1921)
- Manslaughter (1922)
- Beyond the Rocks (1922)
- The Christian (1923)
- The Love Piker (1923)
- Grumpy (1923)
- The Sea Hawk (1924)
- The Dramatic Life of Abraham Lincoln (1924)
- Vanity's Price (1924)
- Captain Blood (1924)
- Blue Blood (1925)
- Raffles, the Amateur Cracksman (1925)
- Stella Maris (1925)
- Tarzan and the Golden Lion (1927)
- Women's Wares (1927)
- The Wise Wife (1927)
- The Tip Off (1929)
- A Single Man (1929)
- The Florodora Girl (1930)
- Charley's Aunt (1930)
- Grumpy (1930)
- New Adventures of Get Rich Quick Wallingford (1931)
- The Great Impersonation (1935)
- The Moon's Our Home (1936)
