= Puppy Love (1919 film) =

1919 film

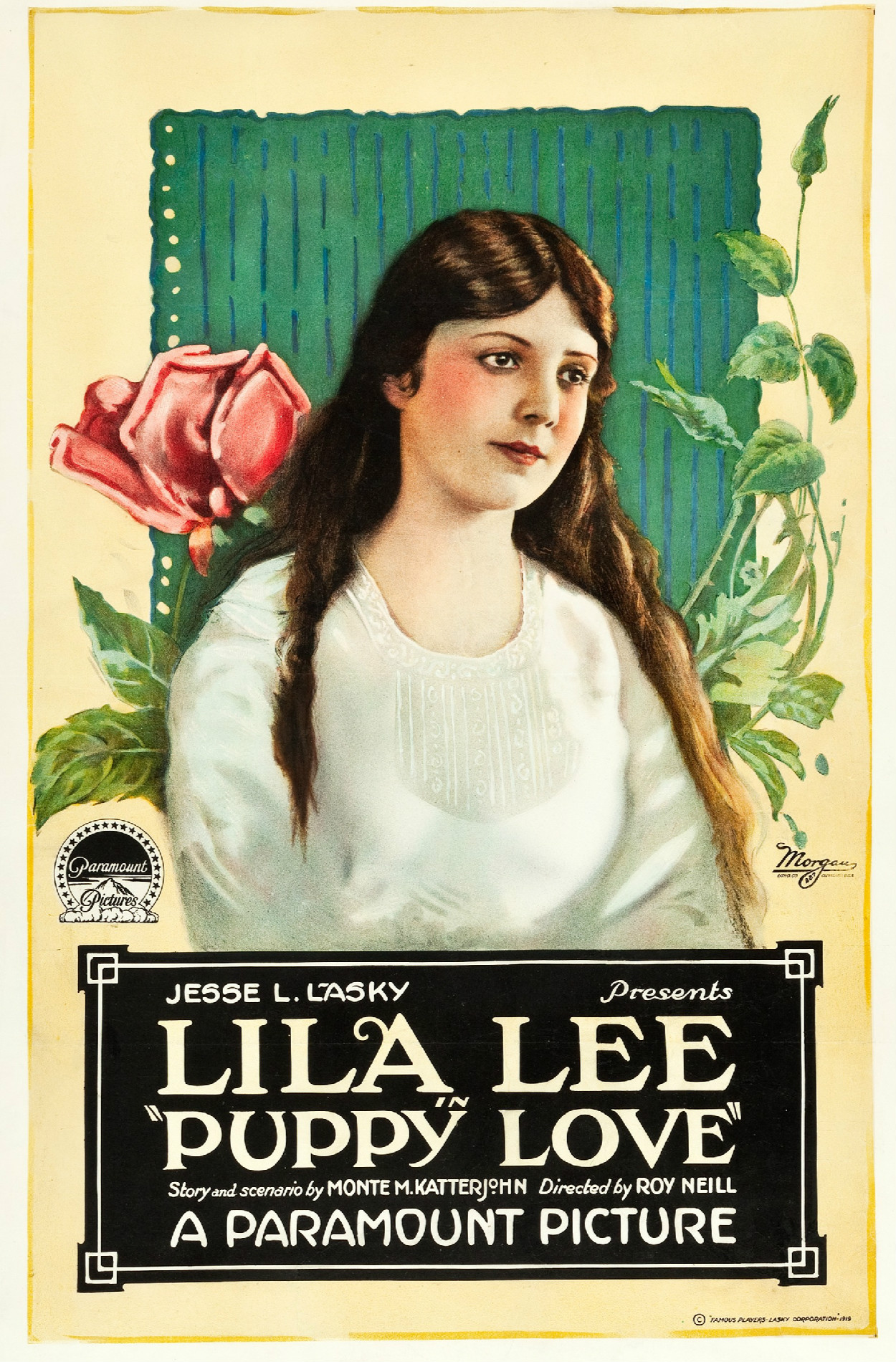
- Film poster
- Directed by: Roy William Neill
- Written by: Monte Katterjohn
- Produced by: Adolph Zukor; Jesse Lasky
- Starring: Lila Lee
- Cinematography: Henry Kotani; James Wong Howe (ass't)
- Distributed by: Famous Players–Lasky; Paramount Pictures
- Release date: March 2, 1919
- Running time: 50 minutes; 5 reels
- Country: USA
- Language: Silent...English intertitles

Puppy Love is a lost 1919 silent comedy film directed by Roy William Neill with Lila Lee in one of her first starring roles.

== Cast ==
- Josephine Crowell - Mercy Winters
- Helen Dunbar - Mrs. Oliver
- Emily Gerdes - Phyllis Winters
- Harold Goodwin - James Gordon Oliver
- Alice Knowland - Saraphina Winters
- Lila Lee - Gloria O'Connell
- Edna Murphy -
- Charles Murray - Shamus O'Connell
- Lincoln Stedman - Hippo Harger
