= The Michigan Kid (1928 film) =

1928 film

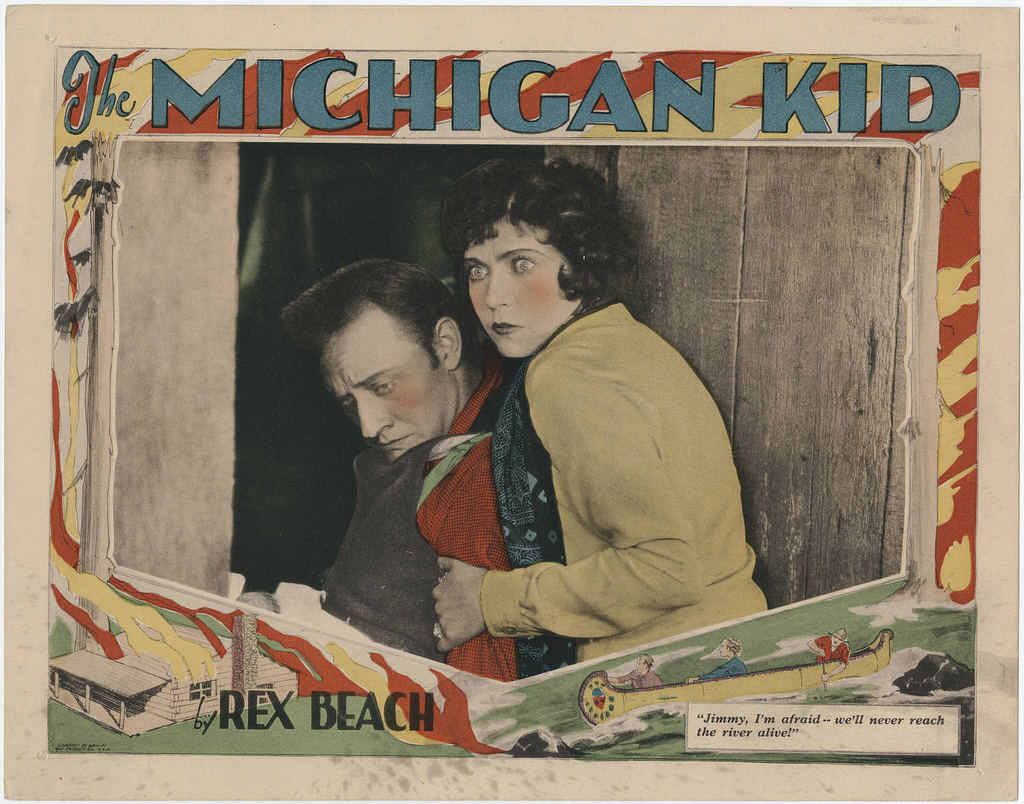
- Directed by: Irvin Willat
- Written by: J. Grubb Alexander; Rex Beach; Walter Anthony; J. G. Hawks; Charles A. Logue; Peter Milne; Irvin Willat
- Starring: Conrad Nagel; Renée Adorée; Lloyd Whitlock
- Cinematography: Charles J. Stumar
- Edited by: Harry Marker
- Production company: Universal Pictures
- Distributed by: Universal Pictures
- Release date: June 30, 1928
- Running time: 64 minutes
- Country: United States
- Languages: Silent; English intertitles

The Michigan Kid is a 1928 American silent drama film directed by Irvin Willat and starring Conrad Nagel, Renée Adorée and Lloyd Whitlock.

== Cast ==
- Conrad Nagel as Michigan Kid/Jim Rowen
- Renée Adorée as Rose Morris
- Lloyd Whitlock as Frank Hayward
- Fred Esmelton as Hiram Morris
- Adolph Milar as Shorty
- Maurice Murphy as Jimmy Cowan – as a Child
- Virginia Grey as Rose – as a Child
- Don House as Frank Howard – as a Child
- Walter Brennan as Extra

== Bibliography ==
- Munden, Kenneth White. The American Film Institute Catalog of Motion Pictures Produced in the United States, Part 1. University of California Press, 1997.
