= Rustling a Bride =

1919 film

Rustling A Bride
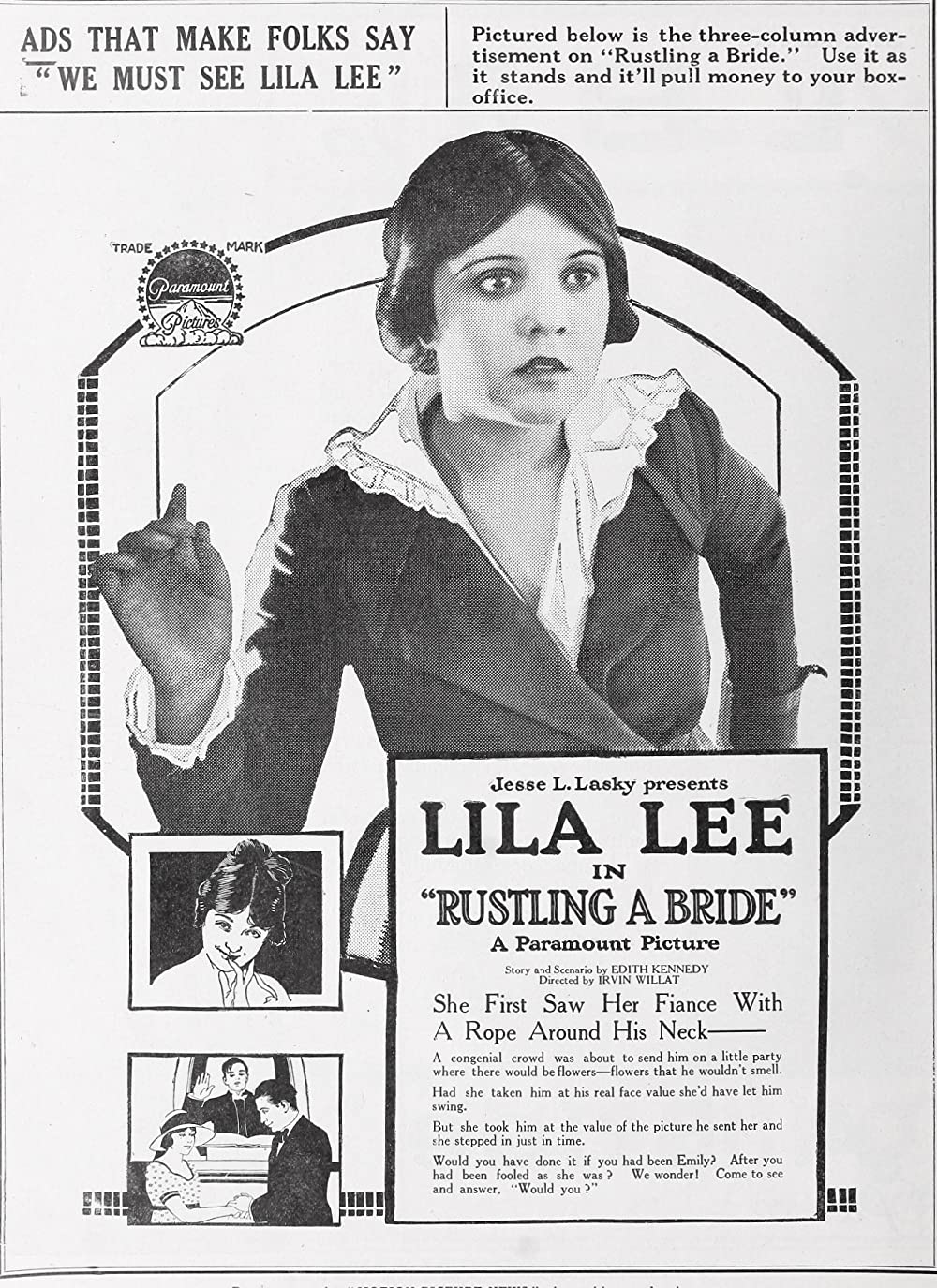
- Directed by: Irvin Willat; Roy Marshall
- Written by: Edith Kennedy (story, scenario)
- Produced by: Adolph Zukor; Jesse Lasky
- Starring: Lila Lee; Monte Blue
- Cinematography: Henry Kotani
- Distributed by: Paramount Pictures
- Release date: April 27, 1919
- Running time: 5 reels
- Country: United States
- Languages: Silent; English intertitles

Rustling A Bride is a lost 1919 silent film comedy-Western directed by Irvin Willat and starring Lila Lee.

== Plot ==
As described in a film magazine, cowboy Nick McCredie discovers the name and address of a Kentucky girl on the fly leaf of an old school book, writes to her, and as a joke includes the photograph of Pen Walton, a fellow cowpuncher. In time a warm friendship develops between Emily and Nick, and when her grandmother, her only living relative, dies and she is proposed to by an old man who covets the farm, she flees to the west to marry Nick. He meets her at the rail station and tells her that he is Mr. Andy and that Nick sent him. She is disappointed as Nick had instantly won her. Walton, who thoroughly hates Nick, manufactures evidence that implicates Nick as a horse thief. The cowboys go in search of Nick while Emily falls into Walton's hands. She is held captive in a deserted shack in the desert where Walton has secreted valuable horses. Emily makes her escape, turns the horses loose, and reaches the ranch just in time to save Nick from being lynched. Ezra, her guardian, arrives just as the wedding with Nick is about to be performed and is silenced by the heel of one of Nick's friends.

== Cast ==
- Lila Lee as Emily
- Monte Blue as Nick McCredie
- L. C. Shumway as Pen Walton
- Manuel R. Ojeda as Pedro
- Ruby Lafayette as Aunt
- Guy Oliver as Ezry
- Alice Knowland as The School Mistress
- Jim Farley as Sheridan
- Charles McHugh as Irish
- Dick La Reno as Sheriff
- Tom Walsh as Dan
- Roy Marshall as Joe
