= Alice Knowland =

American actress (1879–1930)

- Born: Mary Alice Knowland; October 6, 1879; Fort Fairfield, Maine, USA
- Died: May 27, 1930 (aged 50); Los Angeles, California, USA
- Occupation: Actress
- Spouse: Thomas Seymour (m. 1903)

Alice Knowland (1879–1930) was an American actress active during Hollywood's silent era. She specialized in playing motherly roles.

== Biography ==
Knowland was born in Fort Fairfield, Maine, to Herbert Knowland and Fannie Warren. She told reporters that she spent much of her childhood out of the country, as her father held a consular position in France, but this has not been verified.

She later lived in Boston, where she began a career as a theater actress, before moving to Los Angeles and appearing in films for Famous Players–Lasky. She married Thomas Seymour in 1903; the pair had no children.

== Partial filmography ==
- The Secret Sin (1915)
- The Stronger Love (1916)
- Giving Becky a Chance (1917)
- The Demon (1918)
- Fair Enough (1918)
- Puppy Love (1919)
- Satan Junior (1919)
- The Delicious Little Devil (1919)
- Rustling a Bride (1919)
- The Lion's Den (1919)
- Full of Pep (1919)
- All Soul's Eve (1921)
- On the High Seas (1922)
- Coming Through (1925)
- The King of Kings (1927)
- The Adorable Cheat (1928)
- Dugan of the Dugouts (1928)
