= A. Edward Sutherland =

American actor (1895–1973)

- Born: January 5, 1895; London, England
- Died: December 31, 1973 (aged 78); Palm Springs, California, U.S.
- Other name: Eddie Sutherland
- Years active: 1914–1961
- Spouses: 5, including: Marjorie Daw (m. 1923; div. 1925) Louise Brooks (m. 1926; div. 1928)
- Relatives: Blanche Ring (aunt); Cyril Ring (uncle)

Albert Edward 'Eddie' Sutherland (January 5, 1895 – December 31, 1973) was a British-born American film director and actor. Born in London, he was from a theatrical family. His father, Al Sutherland, was a theatre manager and producer and his mother, Julie Ring, was a vaudeville performer. He was a nephew of both Blanche Ring and Thomas Meighan, who was married to Frances Ring, another of his mother's sisters.

Sutherland acted in 37 known films early in his career, beginning as a Keystone Cop in Tillie's Punctured Romance (1914), which starred Charlie Chaplin, Mabel Normand, and Marie Dressler.

== Career ==
Sutherland was directed by Charlie Chaplin in A Woman of Paris (1923), two years before Sutherland began his directing career with the help of Chaplin.

Frequently billed as "Eddie Sutherland," he is best known as a director; he directed more than 50 movies between 1925 and 1956. His breakout film was Behind the Front (1926), which made stars of leads Wallace Beery and Raymond Hatton and established Sutherland as a comedic director. He had an especially hard time working with Stan Laurel, whom he disliked ("I'd rather eat a tarantula than work with Laurel again"). On the other hand, he became close friends with the more famously acerbic W.C. Fields, with whom he established a lifelong friendship, though by at least one account they got off to a rocky start. In 1940, he directed One Night in the Tropics, which was the film debut of Abbott and Costello. Other notable films include Palmy Days, International House, Too Much Harmony, The Flying Deuces, The Navy Comes Through, Dixie, and Follow the Boys.

Sutherland's last directing assignment was working on the Mack & Myer for Hire TV comedies with Joey Faye and Mickey Deems for Sandy Howard TV Productions and Trans-Lux Television in 1965.

== Personal life ==
Sutherland was married five times. Among his wives were Marjorie Daw (from 1923 to 1925) and Louise Brooks (from July 1926 to June 1928). He and Brooks met on the set of It's the Old Army Game, which he directed and which also co-starred his aunt Blanche Ring. Brooks and Sutherland did not have a happy marriage; there were numerous reports on both sides of infidelity. He did not have children in any of his marriages. Sutherland lived in and owned the Calypso Apartments in South Palm Springs, California, where he died in 1973.

== Filmography ==
=== As actor ===
- The Danger Girl (1916)
- Which Woman? (1918)
- Love Insurance (1919)
- A Girl Named Mary (1919)
- All of a Sudden Peggy (1920)
- The Paliser Case (1920)
- Conrad in Quest of His Youth (1920)
- The Dollar-a-Year Man (1921)
- Just Outside the Door (1921)
- The Light in the Clearing (1921)
- The Witching Hour (1921)
- Everything for Sale (1921)
- Nancy from Nowhere (1922)
- The Ordeal (1922)
- Elope If You Must (1922)
- The Loaded Door (1922)
- The Woman He Loved (1922)
- Girl from the West (1923)
- The Dramatic Life of Abraham Lincoln (1924)

=== As director ===
- Coming Through (1925)
- Wild, Wild Susan (1925)
- A Regular Fellow (1925)
- Behind the Front (1926)
- It's the Old Army Game (1926)
- We're in the Navy Now (1926)
- Love's Greatest Mistake (1927)
- Fireman, Save My Child (1927)
- Figures Don't Lie (1927)
- Tillie's Punctured Romance (1928)
- What a Night! (1928)
- Pointed Heels (1929)
- Fast Company (1929)
- The Dance of Life (1929)
- Paramount on Parade (1930)
- June Moon (1931)
- Up Pops the Devil (1931)
- Palmy Days (1931)
- Secrets of the French Police (1932)
- Sky Devils (1932)
- Mr. Robinson Crusoe (1932)
- Too Much Harmony (1933)
- International House (1933)
- Murders in the Zoo (1933)
- Mississippi (1935)
- Diamond Jim (1935)
- Poppy (1936)
- Every Day's a Holiday (1937)
- The Flying Deuces (1939)
- The Invisible Woman (1940)
- Beyond Tomorrow (1940)
- One Night in the Tropics (1940)
- The Boys from Syracuse (1940)
- Nine Lives Are Not Enough (1941)
- Army Surgeon (1942)
- The Navy Comes Through (1942)
- Dixie (1943)
- Follow the Boys (1944)
- Abie's Irish Rose (1946)
- Bermuda Affair (1956)
