= The Adorable Cheat =

1928 film directed by Burton L. King

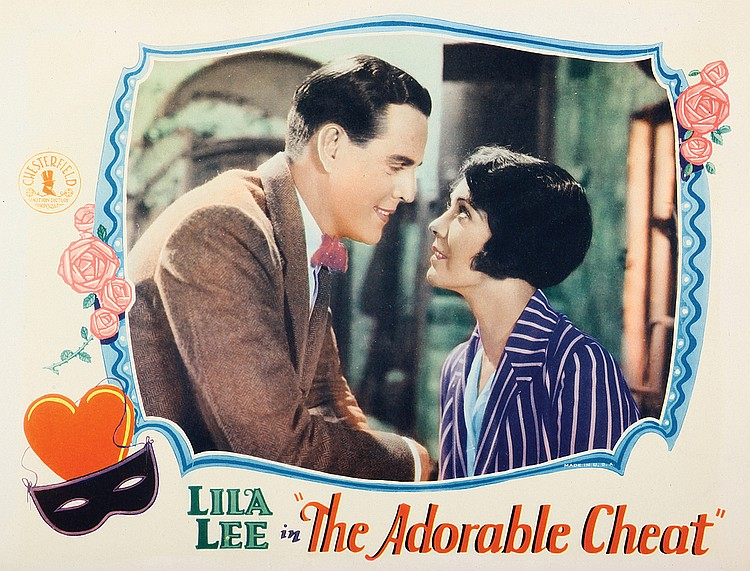
- Directed by: Burton L. King
- Written by: Arthur Hoerl (scenario); De Leon Anthony (intertitles)
- Starring: Lila Lee
- Cinematography: M.A. Anderson
- Edited by: De Leon Anthony
- Production company: Chesterfield Motion Pictures
- Distributed by: Chesterfield Pictures
- Release date: August 15, 1928
- Running time: 59 minutes; 6 reels
- Country: United States
- Languages: Silent; English intertitles

The Adorable Cheat (1928) by Burton L. King

The Adorable Cheat is a 1928 American silent romantic drama film starring Lila Lee and distributed by an independent film company, Chesterfield Motion Pictures. It was directed by Burton L. King with a copy being long held by the Library of Congress.

== Summary ==
The daughter of a wealthy industrialist wants to take over the company when her father retires, but the father—an old-fashioned sort who believe that "girls" do not belong in business—is planning on leaving the company to her wastrel playboy brother. In order to prove to her dad that she can handle the job, she disguises herself as an ordinary "working girl" and gets a job in her dad's plant. There she meets and falls in love with a clerk. She brings the young man home to meet her folks, but during the evening the family safe is robbed, and all signs point to her new boyfriend.

== Cast ==
- Lila Lee as Marion Dorsey
- Cornelius Keefe as George Mason
- Reginald Sheffield as Will Dorsey
- Burr McIntosh as Cyrus Dorsey
- Gladden James as Howard Carter
- Harry Allen as 'Dad' Mason
- Alice Knowland as Mrs. Mason
- Virginia Lee as Roberta Arnold
- Rolfe Sedan as Card Playing Guest
