= His Athletic Wife =

1913 short film

- Starring: Wallace Beery; Gertrude Forbes; Robert Bolder
- Production company: Essanay Studios
- Distributed by: General Film Company
- Release date: August 27, 1913
- Country: United States
- Language: Silent (English intertitles)

His Athletic Wife is a 1913 lost silent comedy film short starring Wallace Beery, Gertrude Forbes and Robert Bolder. This is currently believed to have been Beery's first film in his 36-year career of acting in more than 250 films.

== Plot ==
Mr. Strong is the husband of the domineering Mrs. Strong, who due to her physical strength is the manager of the house, including her husband's finances. While shopping, she runs into a man and her purse's contents spill onto the ground. When gathering her items, she notices her husband's pocketbook missing, and chases after the man she ran into, thinking that he had stolen it. Seeing him hold a similar pocketbook, she snatches it away from him and returns home. She tells her husband about the theft, and later he finds his pocketbook on his dresser. Mrs. Strong must then return the pocketbook to its rightful owner.

== Cast ==
- Wallace Beery as Mr. Strong
- Gertrude Forbes as Mrs. Strong
- Robert Bolder as Policeman
