= Behind the Door =

1919 film by Irvin Willat

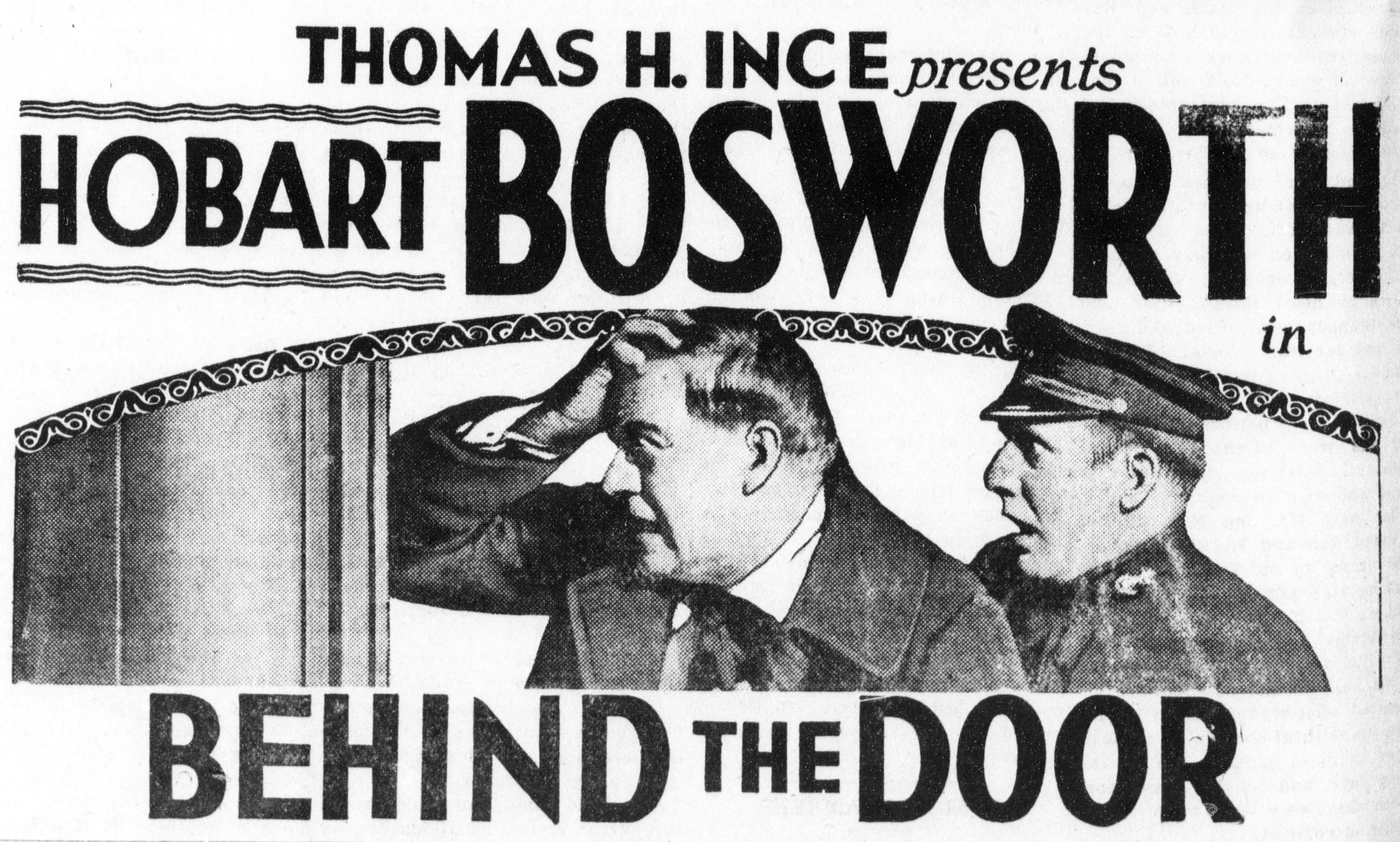
- Newspaper advertisement
- Directed by: Irvin Willat
- Written by: Luther Reed (scenario)
- Based on: "Behind the Door"; 1918 story in McClure's Magazine by Gouverneur Morris
- Produced by: Thomas H. Ince
- Starring: Hobart Bosworth; Jane Novak; Wallace Beery
- Cinematography: J. O. Taylor; Frank M. Blount
- Edited by: Irvin Willat
- Distributed by: Paramount Pictures
- Release date: December 14, 1919
- Running time: 70 minutes; 7 reels
- Country: United States
- Language: Silent (English intertitles)

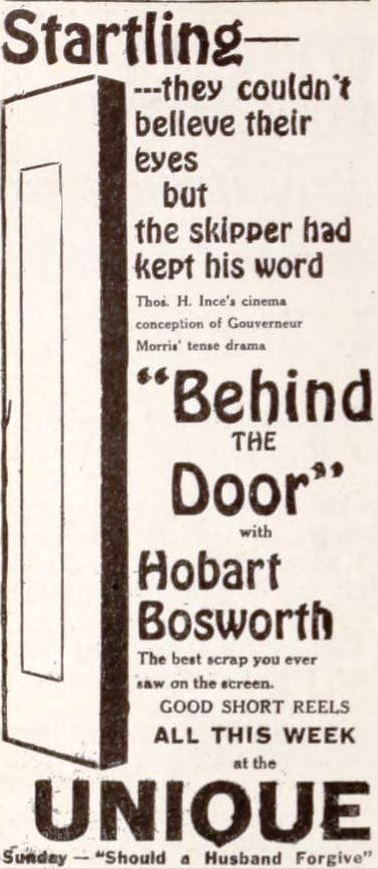
The skipper had vowed to skin Brandt alive for murdering his wife.

Behind the Door is a surviving 1919 silent war drama film produced by Thomas Ince, directed by Irvin Willat and distributed by Paramount Pictures. The picture is a starring vehicle for veteran actor Hobart Bosworth and the supporting cast features Jane Novak and Wallace Beery. The film's source is a short story by Gouverneur Morris, also titled "Behind the Door," published in McClure's Magazine in July 1917. The film is extant at the Library of Congress and the Gosfilmofond Russian State Archive. In 2016, the San Francisco Silent Film Festival, working with the Library of Congress and Gosfilmofond, created a more fully-restored print of the film.

== Plot ==
In 1925 (set six years after the film's release), the silhouetted figure of Oscar Krug, a seafarer, enters a graveyard above a town in coastal Maine. That morning in town, he enters the abandoned taxidermy shop he once owned. He slumps at his former worktable and is lost in memory. Except for the last scene, the rest of the film's story is an extended flashback.

In 1917, Krug, a German-American taxidermist who had been a sailor in the U.S. Navy is subject to suspicion and resentment by the townspeople. He nonetheless wins the heart of Alice Morse, despite the disapproval of her father, the town banker. When news arrives of the U.S. declaration of war against Germany, the townspeople question Krug's patriotism, even though he was already on the way to enlist. A mass fistfight ensues, with the group's leader, Bill Tavish, finally accepting Krug's devotion to his country. The two men rush off to enlist in the Navy. Krug and Alice are married in secret soon after.

Alice is thrown out by her father when he learns of the marriage, and she manages to stow away on the Navy ship that Krug now commands. The ship's nurse takes her on as an assistant before she reveals her presence to Krug. Krug's ship is sunk by a German U-boat, commanded by Lt. Brandt, who then abducts Alice from the lifeboat that she and Krug shared, with Krug vowing revenge.

Now in command of a new ship, Krug is still haunted by his hatred. His ship sinks a U-boat that turns out to have been commanded by Brandt. To his crew's bewilderment, Krug welcomes Brandt to his cabin, speaking German and getting him drunk. Not knowing Krug's identity, Brandt brags about how Alice was sexually abused and died. Krug then reveals himself and binds Brandt behind a closet door. When Krug's first officers enter the cabin, they are horrified to discover that Krug, with his taxidermy tools, had skinned Brandt alive.

In the final scene, set again in the film's present, Krug collapses at his worktable and dies. His spirit is greeted by that of Alice, and the two are united again in death.

== Cast ==
- Hobart Bosworth as Oscar Krug
- Jane Novak as Alice Morse
- Wallace Beery as Lieutenant Brandt
- James Gordon as Bill Tavish
- Dick Wain as McQuestion (credited as Richard Wain/or Wayne)
- J. P. Lockney as Matthew Morse
- Gibson Gowland as Gideon Blank
- Otto Hoffman as Mark Arnold
- Tom Ashton as Fishing Boy

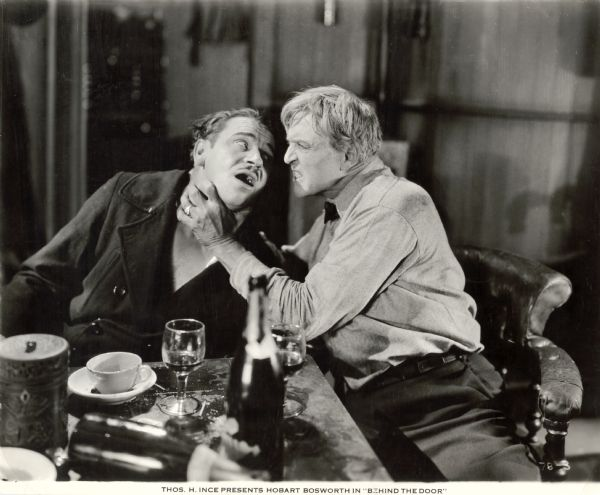
Still from the Behind the Door with German U-boat commander Lieutenant Brandt (portrayed by Wallace Beery) being throttled by American Merchant Marine Captain Oscar Krug (Hobart Bosworth).

== Home media ==
Flicker Alley released a Blu-ray/DVD restored edition on April 4, 2017.
