= Fireman, Save My Child (1927 film) =

1927 film by A. Edward Sutherland

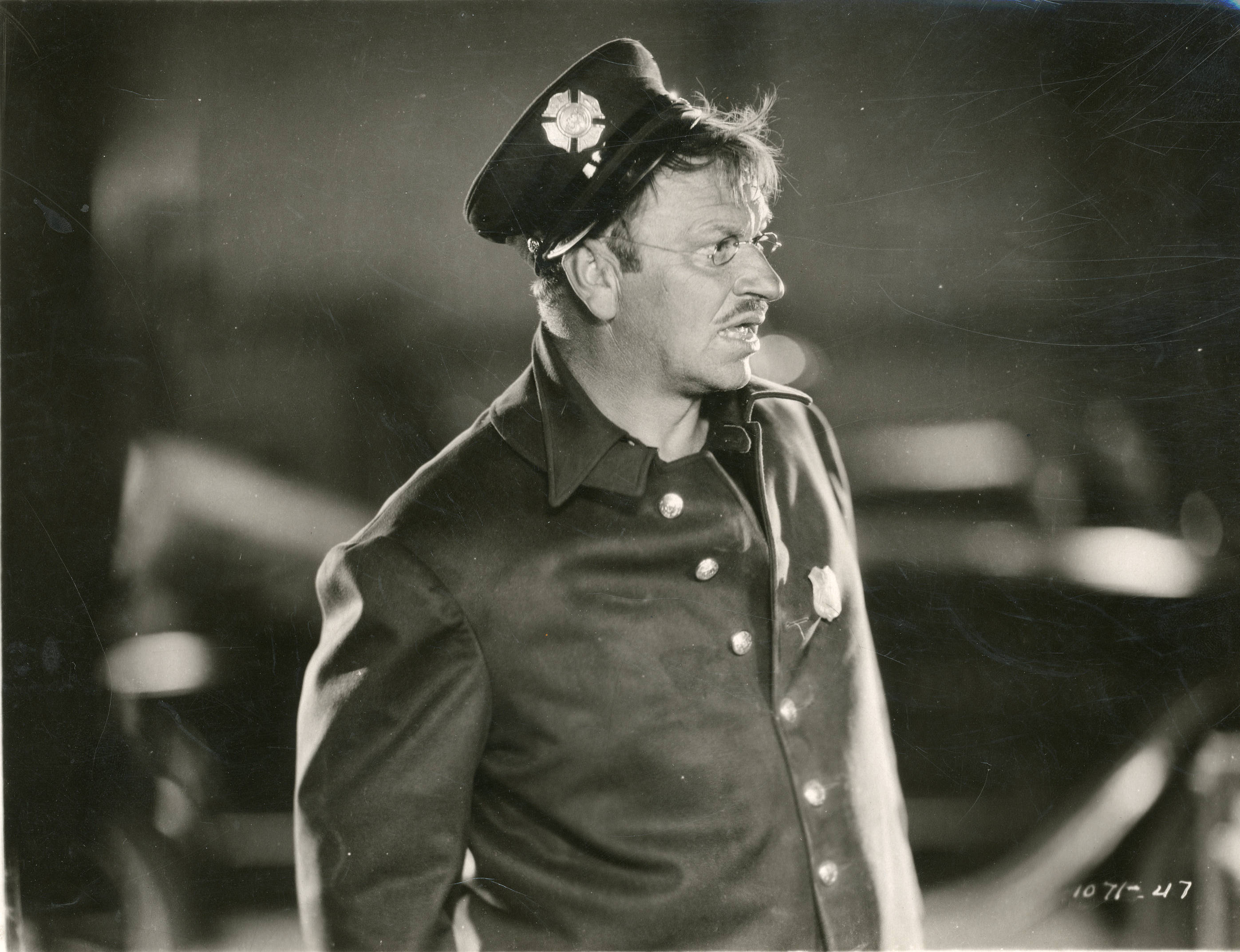
- Wallace Beery as Elmer
- Directed by: A. Edward Sutherland
- Written by: Monte Brice; Thomas J. Geraghty
- Produced by: Adolph Zukor; Jesse Lasky; B. P. Schulberg (associate producer)
- Starring: Wallace Beery; Raymond Hatton
- Cinematography: H. Kinley Martin
- Distributed by: Paramount Pictures
- Release date: August 1, 1927
- Running time: 60 minutes; (6 reels, 5,399 feet)
- Country: United States
- Languages: Silent film English intertitles

Fireman, Save My Child is a 1927 American silent film featuring the part-time screen comedy team of Wallace Beery and Raymond Hatton. The screenplay was written by Monte Brice and Thomas J. Geraghty, and the film directed by A. Edward Sutherland. A print of this film is known to exist.

== Plot ==
Elmer and Sam are two childhood friends who by chance both end up working as firefighters for the same department.

One day they go out to a call at the house of Chief Dumston of the fire department. They rescue a parrot that belong to Dora Dumston, the chief's daughter. Later that day, a second call comes in for the Chief's house. This time Elmer and Sam rescue Captain Kennedy of the fire department, who for some reason was wrapped up in a blanket inside the house.

== Cast ==
- Wallace Beery as Elmer
- Raymond Hatton as Sam
- Josephine Dunn as Dora Dumston
- Tom Kennedy as Captain Kennedy
- Roland Drew as Walter Goss
- Joseph W. Girard as Chief Dumston
- Thelma Todd (uncredited role)

== See also ==
Filmography of Wallace Beery
