= Behind the Front (film) =

1926 film by A. Edward Sutherland

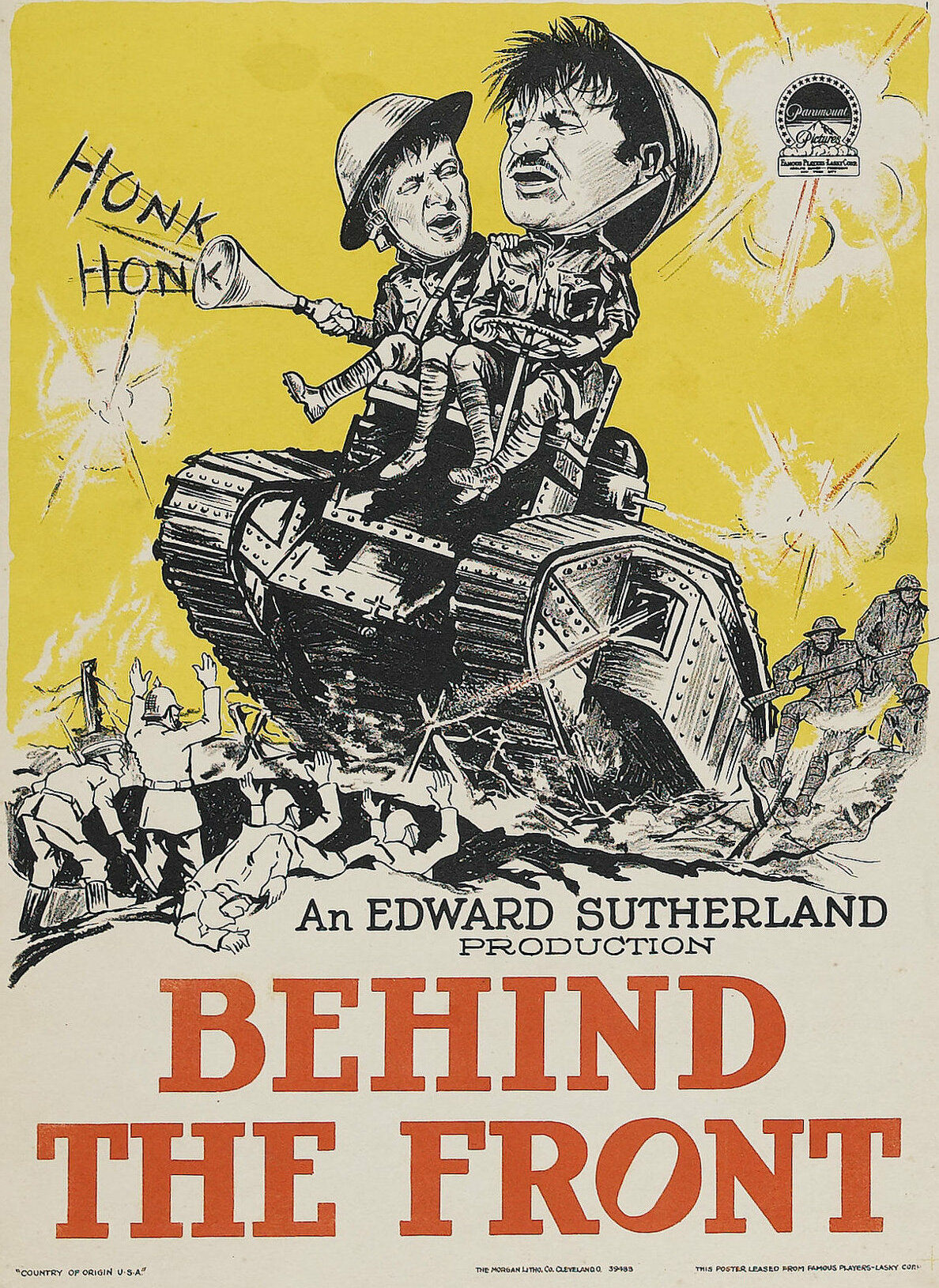
- Theatrical poster
- Directed by: A. Edward Sutherland
- Written by: Monte Brice (adaptation); Ethel Doherty (screenplay)
- Based on: The Spoils of War by Hugh Wiley
- Produced by: Adolph Zukor; Jesse Lasky
- Starring: Wallace Beery; Raymond Hatton
- Cinematography: Charles P. Boyle
- Distributed by: Paramount Pictures
- Release date: February 22, 1926
- Running time: 6 reels
- Country: United States
- Language: Silent (English intertitles)

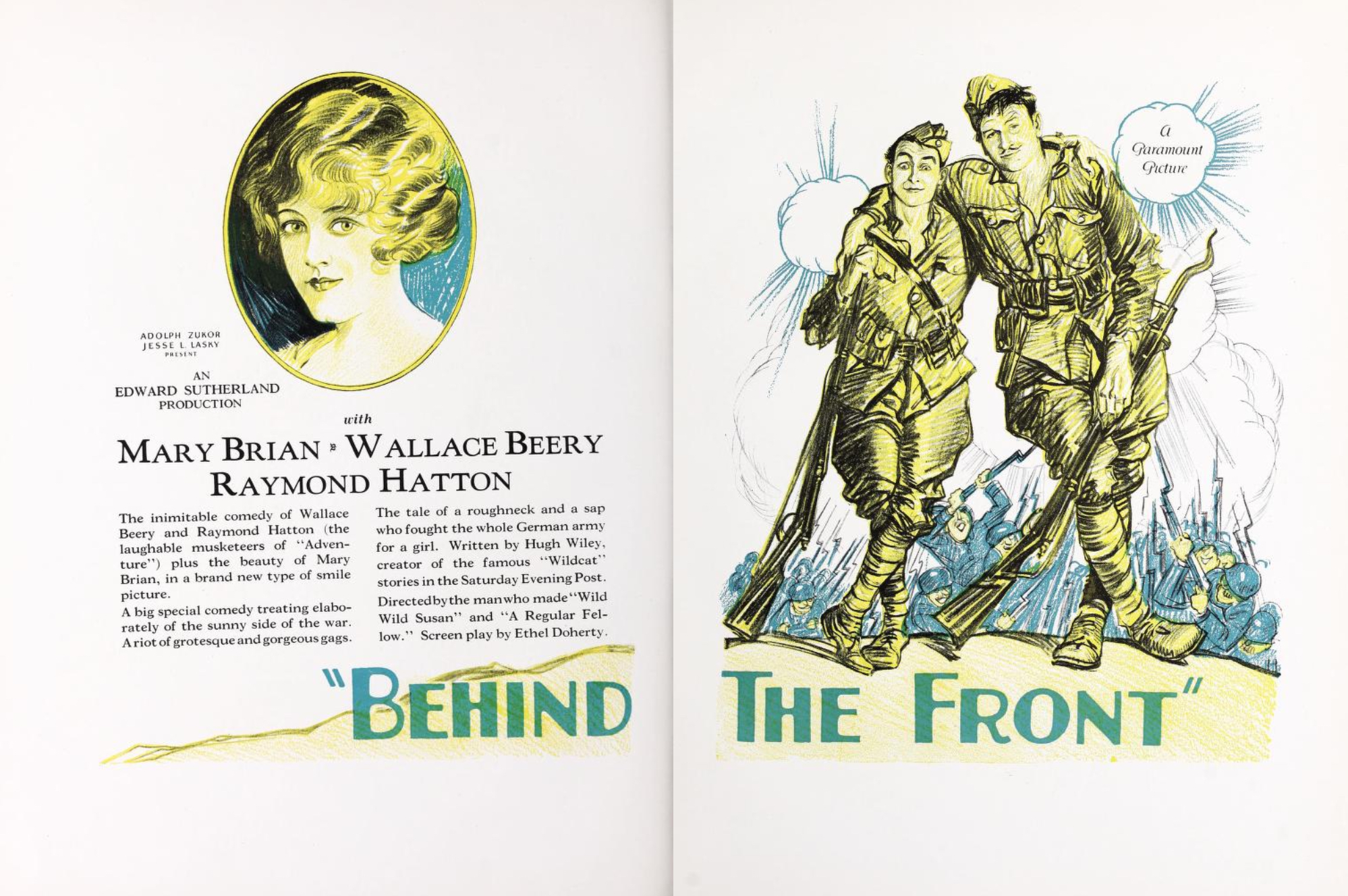
1925 advertisements

Behind the Front is a 1926 American silent war comedy film directed by A. Edward Sutherland and starring Wallace Beery and Raymond Hatton.

Behind the Front was produced by Famous Players–Lasky and distributed by Paramount Pictures. The film was based on the novel The Spoils of War by Hugh Wiley.

== Plot ==
Around 1917, Riff Swanson is walking along the street when he is pickpocketed by Shorty McGee. Riff chases Shorty into the Bartlett-Cooper mansion, where they meet Betty Bartlett-Cooper, who is recruiting men to join the US Army, which is fighting the Germans in World War I in France. Betty tells each man privately that she loves only him; stricken with love, both men enlist in the Army.

Riff and Shorty are sent to France, where they become comrades in arms. However, they are poor soldiers, spending most of there time in the guardhouse or on patrols in no man's land. When the war ends in 1919, Riff and Shorty are sent back to the United States and discharged from the Army. They eagerly return to the Bartlett-Cooper Mansion, only to discover a wedding ceremony for Betty and Percy Brown, the son of ahardtack oligarch.

After roughing up Percy, Riff and Shorty leave the mansion. A small incident recreates their enmity towards each other and their private war resumes.

== Cast ==
- Wallace Beery as Riff Swanson
- Raymond Hatton as Shorty McKee
- Mary Brian as Betty Bartlett-Cooper
- Richard Arlen as Percy Brown
- Hayden Stevenson as Capt. Bartlett-Cooper
- Chester Conklin as Scottie
- Tom Kennedy as Sergeant
- Frances Raymond as Mrs. Bartlett-Cooper
- Melbourne MacDowell as Mr. Bartlett-Cooper
- Jerry Mandy as Limburger Soldier
- Charles Sullivan as Soldier
- Gertrude Astor as French barmaid

== Preservation ==
Prints of Behind the Front are stored in the George Eastman Museum Motion Picture Collection in Rochester, New York, and the UCLA Film and Television Archive in Los Angeles.

== See also ==
- An excerpt from Behind the Front appears in the 1931 Paramount promotional film, The House That Shadows Built
- Gertrude Astor filmography
- Filmography of Wallace Beery
