= Cheering a Husband =

1914 short film

Cheering a Husband is a 1914 short film starring Wallace Beery, produced by the Essanay Film Manufacturing Company, and distributed by the General Film Company.
