= Madame Double X =

1914 short film

- Starring: Wallace Beery; Robert Bolder; Ben Turpin
- Production company: Essanay Studios
- Distributed by: General Film Company
- Release date: December 14, 1914
- Running time: 1 reel
- Country: United States
- Language: Silent (English intertitles)

Madame Double X is a lost 1914 short silent comedy film starring Wallace Beery, Robert Bolder and Ben Turpin. The short was produced by the Essanay Film Manufacturing Company and distributed by the General Film Company.

== Plot ==
A burlesque of the popular drama Madame X. Both Mr. Von Crooks Jr. and Sr. are in love with the same woman, Madame Double X. Mr. Von Crooks Jr. elopes with her and then writes his father a letter asking for his forgiveness, which he refuses and cuts his son off entirely. Madame Double X argues with her husband over an expensive millinery bill, and he chokes her until she promises to not collect any more hats. While he is sleeping, she takes revenge, and his screams attract the attentions of the police. She is caught with a turkey feather in her hand, and it leads the police to believe that she tickled her husband to death. At trial, the liquor starts to flow and just as the most incriminating evidence is served, her husband runs into her arms. The courtroom turns into a battlefield as Madame Double X fights her way to freedom.

== Cast ==
- Wallace Beery as Madame Double X
- Robert Bolder as Mr. Von Crooks, Sr.
- Ben Turpin as Mr. Von Crooks, Jr.
- Leo White

as His Son

== Reception ==
Moving Picture World was largely negative, finding it repulsive and that the "Ridiculous action is not productive of real comedy."
