= The Heritage of the Desert (film) =

1924 film

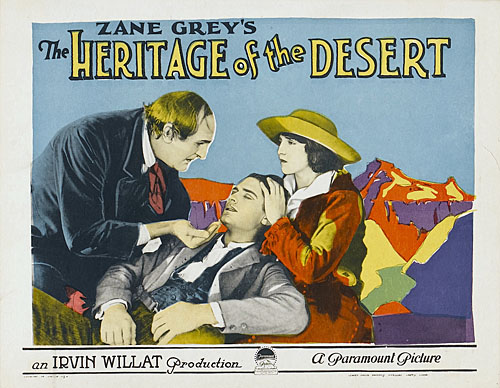
- Lobby card
- Directed by: Irvin Willat
- Written by: Albert S. LeVino (adaptation)
- Based on: The Heritage of the Desert by Zane Grey
- Produced by: Adolph Zukor; Jesse L. Lasky
- Starring: Bebe Daniels; Ernest Torrence; Noah Beery
- Cinematography: Charles Schoenbaum
- Edited by: Howard Hawks
- Distributed by: Paramount Pictures
- Release date: January 23, 1924
- Running time: 60 minutes
- Country: United States
- Language: Silent (English intertitles)

The Heritage of the Desert is a 1924 American silent Western film directed by Irvin Willat and based on the novel of the same name by Zane Grey. It stars Bebe Daniels, Ernest Torrence, and Noah Beery. The film was released by Paramount Pictures with sequences filmed in an early Technicolor process.

== Plot ==
As described in a film magazine review, Jack Hare, an Eastern lad, reaches an outlaw settlement in the far West, and is cast out into the desert by Holderness. Jack is rescued by settler August Naab, against whom Holderness holds a grudge. Jack and Mescal, a ward of August, fall in love, although she is engaged to marry August's youngest son. The latter is killed by Holderness, who kidnaps Mescal. August and his Indian allies raid the outlaw settlement and destroy it. Holderness tries to escape on horseback with Mescal, but Jack pursues and collides with him while on the edge of a precipice, and Holderness plunges to his death. Jack and Mescal are reunited.

== Cast ==
- Bebe Daniels as Mescal
- Ernest Torrence as August Naab
- Noah Beery as Holderness
- Lloyd Hughes as Jack Hare
- Anne Schaefer as Mrs. Naab (credited as Anne Schaeffer)
- Jim Mason as Snap Naab (credited as James Mason)
- Richard Neill as Dene (credited as Richard R. Neill)
- Tom London as Dave Naab (credited as Leonard Clapham)
- Barbara Brower as Pioneer Child (uncredited)

== Preservation ==
A complete print of The Heritage of the Desert is maintained in the Gosfilmofond archive in Moscow.

== See also ==
- List of early color feature films
