= Ain't It the Truth (film) =

1915 short film

- Starring: Wallace Beery
- Production company: Essanay Film Manufacturing Company
- Distributed by: General Film Company
- Release date: February 22, 1915
- Country: United States
- Language: English

Ain't It the Truth is a 1915 silent comedy short film starring Wallace Beery, Ruth Hennessy, and Robert Bolder. The picture was produced by the Essanay Film Manufacturing Company and distributed by the General Film Company.

== Plot ==
Donald Welling wants to marry a young woman, whose father opposes their marriage. Donald fools the father into believing he has a magical fish bait, and demonstrates by secretly attaching a live fish to father's line when he isn't looking. The father consents to the wedding. Donald, meanwhile, encounters a multitude of friends and they make him believe he is crazy to think of marrying. Eventually Donald is convinced that they are right, and chooses to abandon the idea of marriage entirely.
