= Coming Through (1925 film) =

1925 film by A. Edward Sutherland

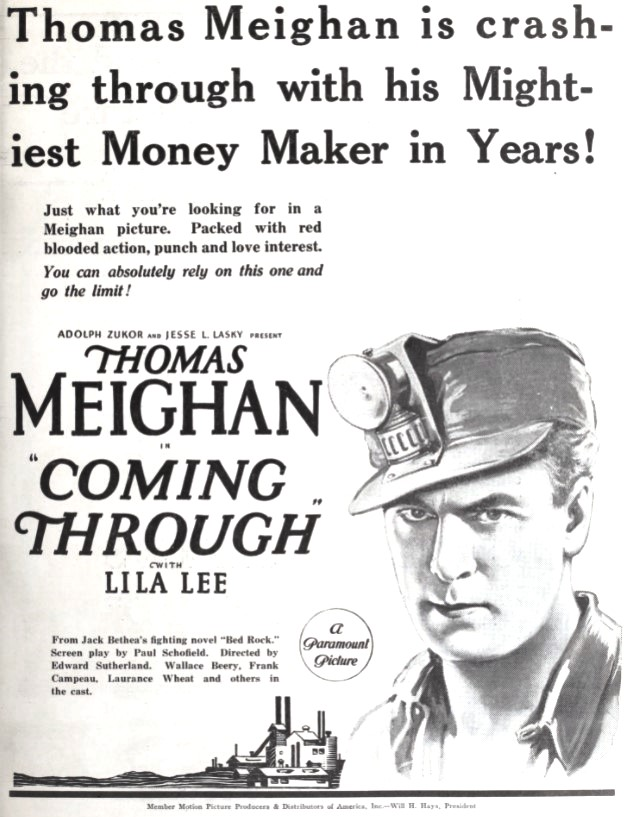
- Advertisement
- Directed by: A. Edward Sutherland
- Written by: Paul Schofield (screenplay)
- Based on: Bed Rock by Jack Bethea
- Produced by: Adolph Zukor; Jesse Lasky
- Starring: Thomas Meighan
- Cinematography: Faxon M. Dean
- Distributed by: Paramount Pictures
- Release date: February 15, 1925
- Running time: 70 mins. 7 reels (6,522 feet)
- Country: United States
- Language: Silent (English intertitles)

Coming Through is a 1925 American silent drama film directed by A. Edward Sutherland starring Thomas Meighan and Lila Lee. Based on Jack Bethea's novel Bed Rock, the film was Sutherland's directorial debut.

== Plot ==
As described in a review in a film magazine, Tom Blackford is a coal miner who is in love with Alice Rand, the daughter his employer, John Rand. John promises Tom a promotion, which would allow him to marry Alice. However, John changes his mind and gives the promotion instead to his nephew.Tom marries Alice anyway, angering her father.

John then hatches a scheme to exact revenge on Tom. John offers Tom the position of superintendent of one of the company's mines. John then tells Joe Lawler, another mine worker, that he didn't get the position. However, John assures Joe that he will become superintendent if Tom quits. John insinuates that Joe can use any means to achieve Tom's resignation.

Alice is upset about Tom's new job and says that she does not love him; the couple endure a platonic honeymoon. Lawler makes a deal with Shackleton, the keeper of the speakeasy near the mine, to stir up trouble at the mine. Shackleton finally succeeds in fomenting a labor strike there.

When a mine engineer gets drunk at the speakeasy and nearly kills some mine workers through his carelessness, Tom closes the speakeasy. He then proves to the workers that Lawler had been cheating them of income by weighing their excavated coal on crooked scales. In the climax of the film, Tom and Joe are fighting on top of the coal tipple As Joe swings an iron bar at Tom, the bar catches in the tipple machinery. Joe is thrown to the ground, where he dies. With the strike over, Tom returns home to find that Alice really does love him.

== Cast ==
- Thomas Meighan as Tom Blackford
- Lila Lee as Alice Rand
- John Miltern as John Rand
- Wallace Beery as Joe Lawler
- Larry Wheat as Munds (credited as Laurance Wheat)
- Frank Campeau as Shackleton
- Gus Weinberg as Dr. Rawls
- Alice Knowland as Mrs. Rawls

== Preservation ==
With no prints of Coming Through located in any film archives, it is a lost film.
