= The Substitute Stenographer =

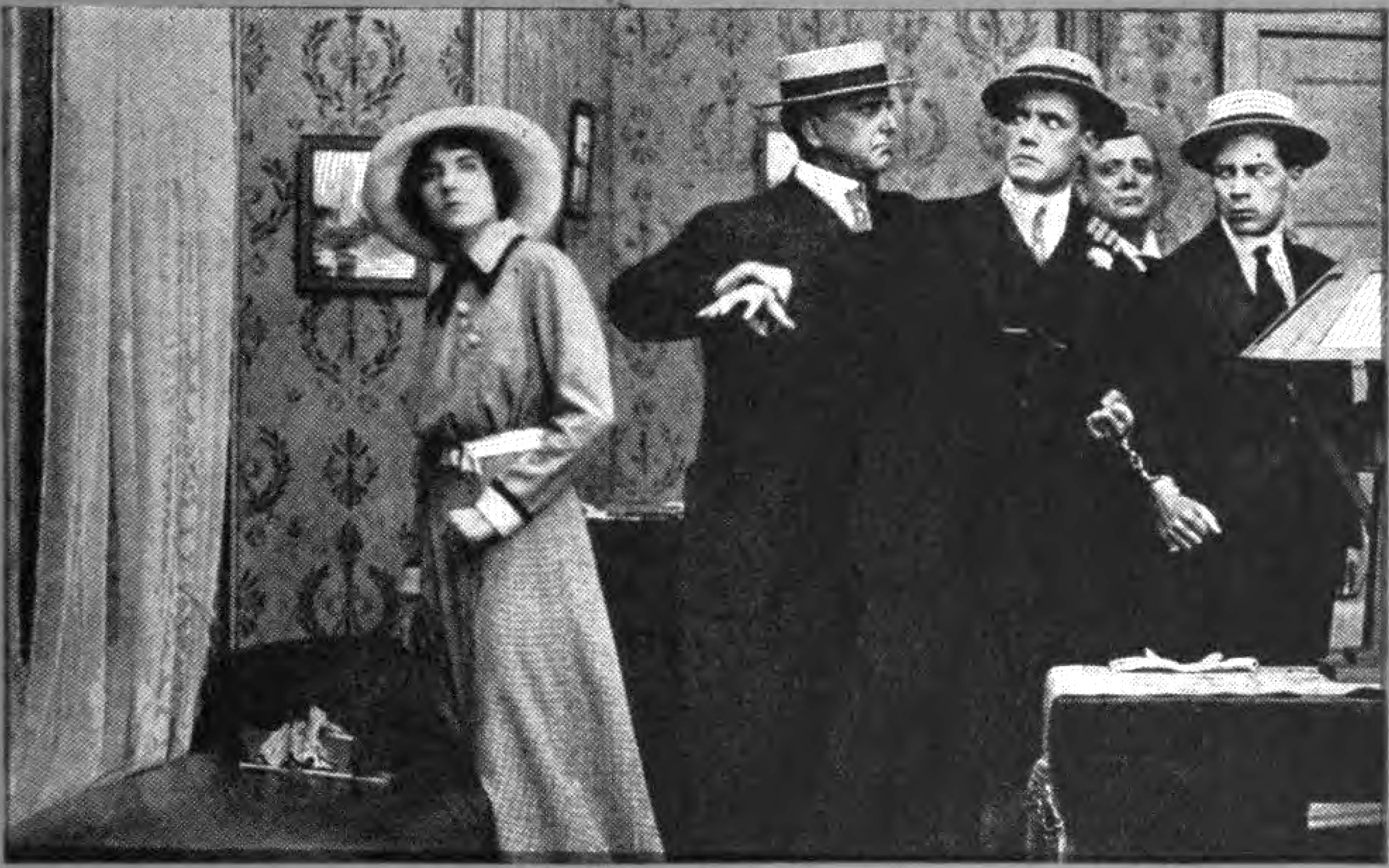
- Still featured in the Edison Kinetogram
- Directed by: Walter Edwin
- Starring: Laura Sawyer
- Production company: Edison Manufacturing Company
- Distributed by: Edison Manufacturing Company
- Release date: 4 August 1913
- Running time: 1000 feet
- Country: United States
- Language: Silent with English intertitles

The Substitute Stenographer, from Edison Studios, was a 1913 American silent film (short) directed by Walter Edwin The film was the third of three "Kate Kirby's Cases" detective tales produced with Edison in 1913 before actress Laura Sawyer left Edison to continue the series later that year with the Famous Players Film Company and the director of the other five films, J. Searle Dawley. It was released in the United States on 4 August 1913.

== Plot ==
Described simply as "A Detective Story", the plot summary in The Edison Kinetogram was:

A detective is just a machine. Someone has done something or something has happened that is more or less of a mystery to the lay mind. A detective is called in and is expected to find out who or what has caused the trouble and to set matters right. That is what he is for.

When Clark, the elder of Clark Brothers Manufacturers, discovered that sums of money varying from ten to fifty dollars were being taken from the safe in his office he sent for the police. He was told to diseharge his stenographer at once and to let it be understood in the office that she was under suspicion. He was also to send the discharged stenographer around to the Detective Bureau. This he did.

The poor girl was terrified, but upon arriving at the Detective Bureau she was assured by the detective that she was just going to have a little vacation. Of course a lady detective was sent to take her place. To discover the thieves was so ridiculously easy that by the end of three days she had two of the clerks under arrest. Too much trust had been reposed in them.

But the keen eyes did not detect the fact that the young man of the firm was sadly depressed because of the absence of the stenographer whose place the detective had taken. She had, however, observed that he was a very estimable young man and found herself taking more than a professional interest in him.

But when her time came to leave and the old stenographer came back to take her place, she found herself very much out of things. Young Mr. Clark was so much occupied in welcoming his returned friend that he had no time even to say good-bye to the detective. It hurt the girl more than she would ever have confessed, but after all she had to admit it was just.

== Cast ==
- Herbert Prior as Andrew Clark
- Bessie Learn as the Stenographer
- Richard Neill as the Head Clerk
- Robert Brower as the Police Inspector
- Laura Sawyer as Kate Kirby, the detective
- Harry Beaumont as James Clark, Andrew's brother
- Arthur Housman as the Second Clerk

== Kate Kirby's cases ==
- The Diamond Crown. (Edison – 1913)
- On the Broad Stairway. (Edison – 1913)
- The Substitute Stenographer. (Edison – 1913)
- Chelsea 7750. (Famous Players – 1913)
- An Hour Before Dawn. (Famous Players – 1913)
- The Port of Doom. (Famous Players – 1913)
