= In His Father's Steps =

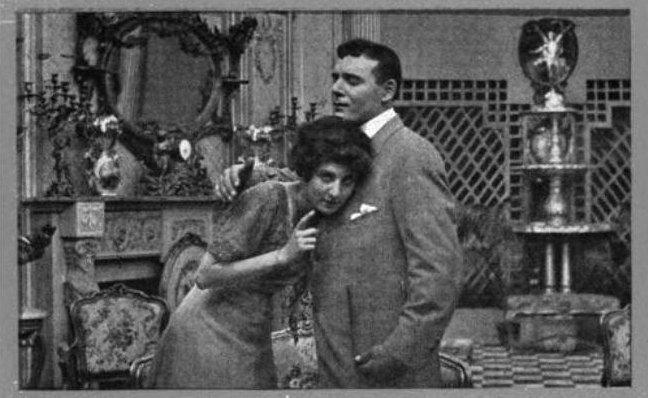
- Laura Sawyer with Ben F. Wilson
- Directed by: J. Searle Dawley
- Written by: Bannister Merwin
- Starring: William West; Ben F. Wilson; Laura Sawyer; James Gordon; William Wadsworth
- Distributed by: Edison
- Release date: August 6, 1912
- Running time: 1000 ft. (approx.)
- Country: United States
- Languages: Silent; English intertitles

In His Father's Steps is an American silent film.

== Release ==
The film was released in the United States on August 6, 1912. It played at the Empress Theatre in Wellington, New Zealand, in December, 1912, and in Masterton and at the New Queen's Theatre in Dunedin in January, 1913.
