= For Valour (1912 film) =

1912 silent American film

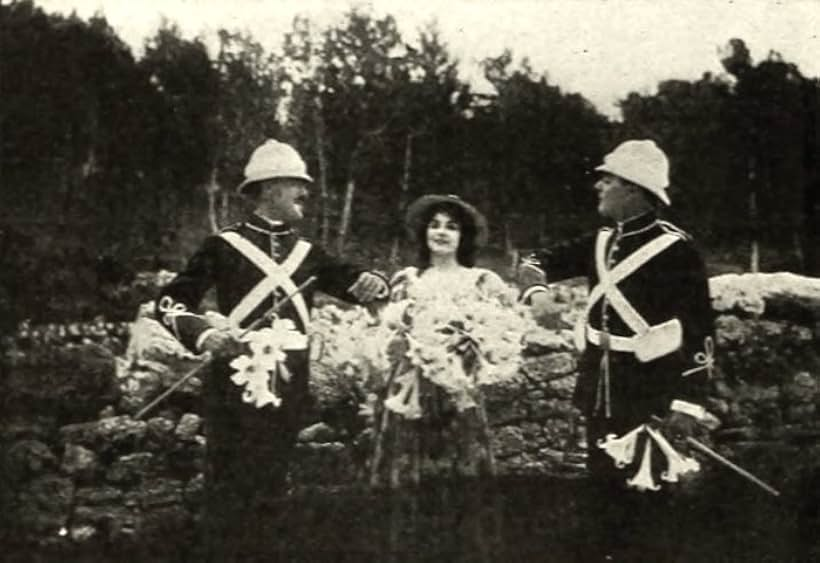
- Film still
- Starring: Laura Sawyer; Richard R. Neill; Ben Wilson
- Production company: Edison Manufacturing Company
- Release date: 1912
- Country: United States
- Languages: Silent; English intertitles

For Valour is a 1912 silent American short film made by the Edison Manufacturing Company. It stars Laura Sawyer, Richard R. Neill, Ben Wilson, and James Gordon. It is based on the short story of the same name by Talbot Mundy. It was directed by J. Searle Dawley.

== Premise ==
Two army officers vie for the affections of a Bermudian woman during the Second Boer War.

== Production ==
The British Imperial fortress colony of Bermuda and its garrison was used as the location for the film. Dawley also shot The Relief of Lucknow at the same time, using the same Bermuda locations and garrisons. Dawley would return to Bermuda in 1920 to film A Virgin Paradise with Pearl White. One of Daley's crew, James Gordon, returned to Bermuda in 1914 with Victory Photoplay Company to film "The Viking" and "The Mystery of the Poison Pool", both starring Betty Harte. The 2nd Battalion of the Lincolnshire Regiment, which had replaced the 2nd Battalion of the Queen's in January, 1914, provided soldiers as extras for the first film.
