= A Woman's Triumph =

- Directed by: J. Searle Dawley
- Based on: the novel The Heart of Midlothian by Sir Walter Scott from The Tales of My Landlord 2nd Series c.1818
- Produced by: Daniel Frohman; Adolph Zukor
- Starring: Laura Sawyer
- Distributed by: State Rights
- Release date: May 10, 1914
- Running time: 4 reels
- Country: USA
- Language: Silent...English intertitles

A Woman's Triumph is a lost 1914 silent film drama directed by J. Searle Dawley and starring Laura Sawyer. It was produced by Daniel Frohman and Adolph Zukor and based on an 1818 story The Heart of Midlothian by Sir Walter Scott.

A rival British film The Heart of Midlothian was released in April 1914.

== Cast ==
- Laura Sawyer as Jeanie Deans
- Betty Harte as Effie Deans
- George Moss as David Deans
- Hal Clarendon as Georgie Robertson
- Wellington Playter as Reuben Butler
- Emily Calloway as Madge Wildfire
- Helen Aubrey as Dame Murdockson
