= The Diamond Crown =

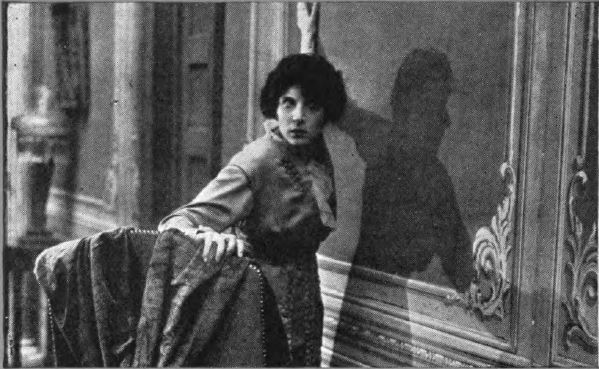
- Laura Sawyer as Kate Kirby
- Directed by: J. Searle Dawley
- Written by: J. Searle Dawley
- Starring: Laura Sawyer
- Production company: Edison Manufacturing Company
- Distributed by: Edison Manufacturing Company
- Release date: July 12, 1913
- Running time: 1000 feet
- Country: United States
- Language: Silent with English intertitles

The Diamond Crown, from Edison Studios, was a 1913 American silent film (short) written and directed by J. Searle Dawley. It was the first of three "Kate Kirby's Cases" detective stories made in 1913 for Edison before Dawley and actress Laura Sawyer left Edison for Famous Players Film Co. later that year, where they produced three more. This film was also Justina Huff's debut in motion pictures. The Diamond Crown was released in the United States on July 12, 1913. This film is considered lost.

== Plot ==
The Kinetogram

This story, the first of the series, introduces the daughter of a retired police officer, Kate Kirby, who receives employment with the police department. Mrs. Wethersby comes to the station with the complaint that several thefts have been committed in her house, and Kate is allowed to undertake the investigation as her first case. Accordingly, she enters Mrs. Wethersby's house as her private secretary.

Besides Mrs. Wethersby, the household consists of a dissipated son and three servants of suspicious appearance.

While writing invitations to a house party in Mrs. Wethersby's room, Miss Kirby discovers a revolver in the drawer of the desk, which Mrs. Wethersby explains she keeps on hand for protection. An inspection of the desk and wall of the room, causes a peculiar expression to pass across Miss Kirby's face. With the aid of a piece of chewing gum, she takes an impression of the key to Mrs. Wethersby's room, and has a duplicate key made for herself.

The guests arrive at the house party and go to their rooms to dress for dinner. Miss Kirby, sitting at Mrs. Wethersby's desk as the hostess makes her preparations, is aware of a subtle delicate perfume, which is markedly different from the odor of the cologne with which Mrs. Wethersby is liberally spraying herself. Immediately, the girl's suspicions are confirmed, and she sends immediate instructions to the police.

That night after the guests have retired, Miss Kirby steals along the dimly lighted hall, and listens with her ear against the wall outside Mrs. Wethersby's room. Suddenly she glides to the door, unlocks it with her duplicate key, and enters. Taking the revolver from the drawer of the desk she waits quietly. After a few moments, the wall of the room slides out of place without a sound, and Mrs. Wethersby, herself the thief, enters through the secret panel, carrying the jewel boxes of the young heiress whose room is next to hers.

Confronted by the quiet figure of her secretary, Mrs. Wethersby rushes to the desk drawer. The discovery that the revolver is missing leaves her no other alternative than to await the arrival of the police who quickly answer the young detective's signal.

== Cast ==
- Laura Sawyer as Kate Kirby
- Charles Stanton Ogle as Her Father
- Robert Brower as Inspector Dalton
- Mrs. Wm. Bechtel as Mrs. Wethersby
- Edward Boulden as Mrs. Wethersby's son, Robert
- Elsie Marquette as Blanche Caldwell
- Justina Huff as Her Maid

== Review ==
Moving Picture World

"The Diamond Crown" (Edison), July 12 – The first of a series of detective stories to be known as the Kate Kirby cases, written by J. Searle Dawley. Laura Sawyer appears as Kate. This first release is a very commendable one; the scenes in the home of Mrs. Wetherby carry a nice air of mystery and are well photographed. The girl, by use of a duplicate key, discovers Mrs. Wetherby in the act of robbing her own guest. Numerous complications are suggested, rather than worked out, but as a one reel detective story this is unusually good.

== Kate Kirby's cases ==
- The Diamond Crown. (Edison – 1913)
- On the Broad Stairway. (Edison – 1913)
- The Substitute Stenographer. (Edison – 1913)
- Chelsea 7750. (Famous Players - 1913)
- An Hour Before Dawn. (Famous Players - 1913)
- The Port of Doom. (Famous Players - 1913)
