= The Death Dance =

1918 film by J. Searle Dawley

The Death Dance is a 1918 American film directed by J. Searle Dawley with Alice Brady as Flora Farnsworth, Holmes Herbert as Arnold Maitland, Mahlon Hamilton as Philip Standish.
