= On the Broad Stairway =

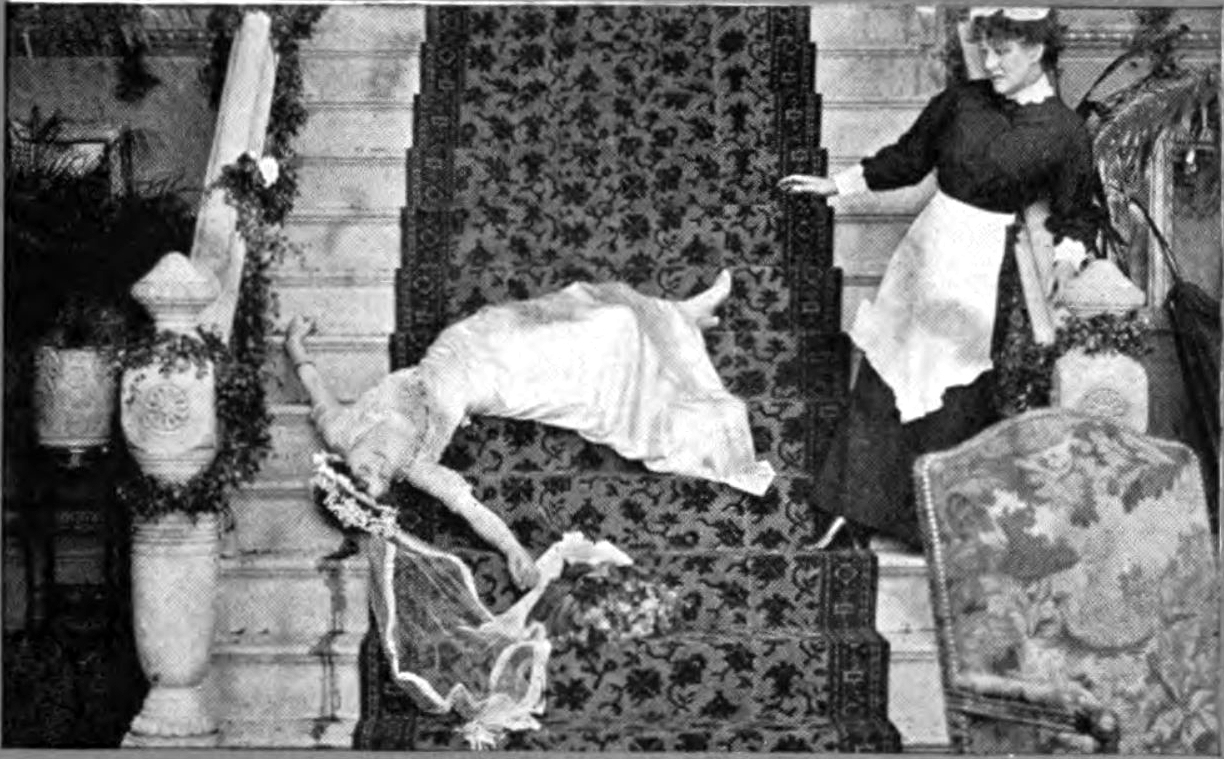
- Film still featured in the 1913 studio publication The Edison Kinetogram
- Directed by: J. Searle Dawley
- Written by: J. Searle Dawley
- Starring: Laura Sawyer
- Production company: Edison Manufacturing Company
- Distributed by: Edison Manufacturing Company
- Release date: July 19, 1913
- Running time: 1025 feet
- Country: United States
- Language: Silent with English intertitles

On The Broad Stairway, from Edison Studios, was a 1913 American silent film (short) written and directed by J. Searle Dawley. The film was the second of three "Kate Kirby's Cases" detective tales produced in 1913 before Dawley and actress Laura Sawyer left Edison to continue the series later that year with the Famous Players Film Company. On The Broad Stairway was released in the United States on July 19, 1913.

== Plot ==
Described as "being another of 'Kate Kirby's Cases', a series of detective stories", the plot summary in The Edison Kinetogram was:

Philip Morton, on the eve of his marriage to Alice Osborn, discovers that he is about to make a terrible mistake, since he loves her sister, Marguerite, more than his bride-to-be. The realization of what he is about to do comes upon him with tragic force, when he meets Marguerite in the hall a scant hour before the ceremony. He declares that he cannot go through with it, that it is all wrong. Marguerite, deeply moved, breaks down momentarily, but, hearing her sister's voice, she commands Morton to go where his honor calls him. Later, seated on a lounge above the great stairway, Marguerite writes a letter to Morton, telling him that despite her great love for him, her little sister's happiness must have the first consideration. Alarmed by somebody approaching, she hides the letter in a portfolio which she tucks behind the lounge.

To the brilliantly apparelled guests awaiting the commencement of the ceremony in a drawing room, a maid suddenly appears with ghastly news. Alice Osborn is lying dead on the great staircase with a knife driven into her back.

Owing to the prominence of the case, the chief of police takes Charge of it himself. With Kate Kirby and a host of policemen, he arrives at the Osborn home, and institutes a rigid inquiry. Kate discovers the letter in Marguerite's portmanteau, and this, coupled with the significant fact that the knife with which the girl was killed is Morton's, leads to the immediate arrest of the suspected man. In a vigorous third degree, the Chief attempts to get incriminating evidence for Marguerite, finally leaving her apparently alone with Morton in the hope that he will convict himself in her presence. However, Morton does nothing but protests his innocence to the anxious girl and the chief finds himself in a deadlock. Meanwhile, Kate Kirby, on the advice of her father, has been searching for finger prints on the lounge above the staircase. Near the edge of the banisters, she finds a slight mark, and immediately her keen mind solves the entire mystery.

== Cast ==
- May Abbey as Marguerite Osborn, the bride's older sister
- Robert Brewer as Inspector Dalton
- Bigelow Cooper as Philip Morton, the groom
- Bessie Learn as Alice Osborn, the bride
- Charles Ogle as Kate's father, an ex-detective
- Laura Sawyer as Detective Kate Kirby

== Review ==
The Moving Picture World

On The Broad Stairway (Edison). July 19. — This very good detective story, by J. Searle Dawley, is the second in the "Kate Kirby Cases" and makes what probably is the best regular release of the last two weeks. The situation at the opening is finely dramatic and it gets a tremendous impetus from the early development of the plot. At the start, we find Bigelow Cooper and Bessie Learn about to be married. Bigelow has discovered that Bessie's older sister, May Abbey, is the one whom he really loves. She returns his love; but won't hear of his breaking Bessie's heart and insists on his going on with the ceremony. She has been interrupted while writing a note to him to this effect, and has slipped it down beside a settle. A few moments later the bride-to-be is found dead on the broad stairway. When the detectives come, it is found that Bigelow's knife killed her, and when May's unfinished note is also found, it looks as though he had murdered her. May does not know that he is innocent, nor does the spectator. One of the detectives is a woman, Laura Sawyer, and when the inspector, Robert Brewer, tries to wring the truth out of May, her sympathies are so worked up that she goes out to make further investigations, believing they will clear May and Bigelow. This we think is the picture's most brilliant scene; but the whole of it is very clever. The acting, photography and direction are all worthy of the best commendation.

== Kate Kirby's cases ==
- The Diamond Crown. (Edison – 1913)
- On the Broad Stairway. (Edison – 1913)
- The Substitute Stenographer. (Edison – 1913)
- Chelsea 7750. (Famous Players - 1913)
- An Hour Before Dawn. (Famous Players - 1913)
- The Port of Doom. (Famous Players - 1913)
