= The Lighthouse by the Sea (1911 film) =

1911 film by Edwin S. Porter

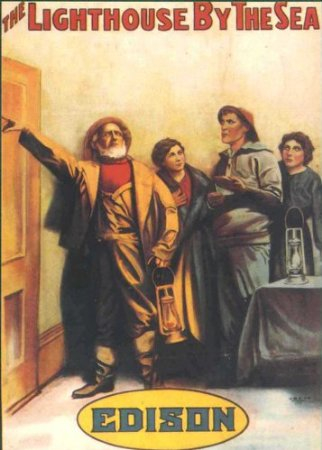
- Promotional poster
- Directed by: Edwin S. Porter
- Written by: Bannister Merwin
- Starring: Charles Sutton; Mabel Trunnelle; Laura Sawyer
- Cinematography: Ernest Haller
- Distributed by: Edison Studios
- Release date: September 15, 1911
- Running time: 15 minutes
- Country: United States
- Language: Silent film

The Lighthouse by the Sea is a 1911 American silent film from a screenplay by Bannister Merwin.

== Cast ==
- Charles Sutton: A Lighthouse Keeper
- Mabel Trunnelle: The Lighthouse Keeper's First Daughter
- Laura Sawyer: The Lighthouse Keeper's Second Daughter
- Richard Neill: The Lighthouse Keeper's Son
- James Gordon: First Young Fisherman
- Herbert Prior: Second Young Fisherman
