= Charles Sutton (actor) =

American actor (1856–1935)

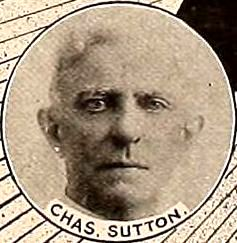
- Sutton from an ad for Democracy: The Vision Restored (1920)
- Born: 1856
- Died: July 20, 1935 (aged 78–79); Englewood, New Jersey, U.S.
- Occupation: Actor
- Years active: 1911–1923

Charles Sutton (1856 – July 20, 1935) was an American actor of the silent era. He appeared in more than one hundred films between 1911 and 1923.

In addition to his work on film, Sutton acted on stage, including working with the Pasadena Players at the Pasadena Community Playhouse. He left there to go to New York, where he worked in plays, including The Three Musketeers.

In his later years, Sutton lived in Englewood, New Jersey, in the Actors Fund Home. On July 20, 1935, he died in Englewood Hospital, aged 79.

== Selected filmography ==
- The Lighthouse by the Sea (1911)
- The Charge of the Light Brigade (1912)
- Hulda of Holland (1913)
- The Old Monk's Tale (1913)
- The Girl of the Gypsy Camp (1915)
- Gladiola (1915)
- When Love Is King (1916)
- The Heart of the Hills (1916)
- The Rainbow Princess (1916)
- The Law of the North (1917)
- Pardners (1917)
- The Royal Pauper (1917)
- The Eternal Mother (1917)
- The Tell-Tale Step (1917)
- Her Boy (1918)
- The Lie (1918)
- Flower of the Dusk (1918)
- A Pair of Cupids (1918)
- Home Wanted (1919)
- A Virgin Paradise (1921)
- Beyond Price (1921)
- As a Man Lives (1923)
