= Chelsea 7750 =

1913 silent film directed by J. Searle Dawley

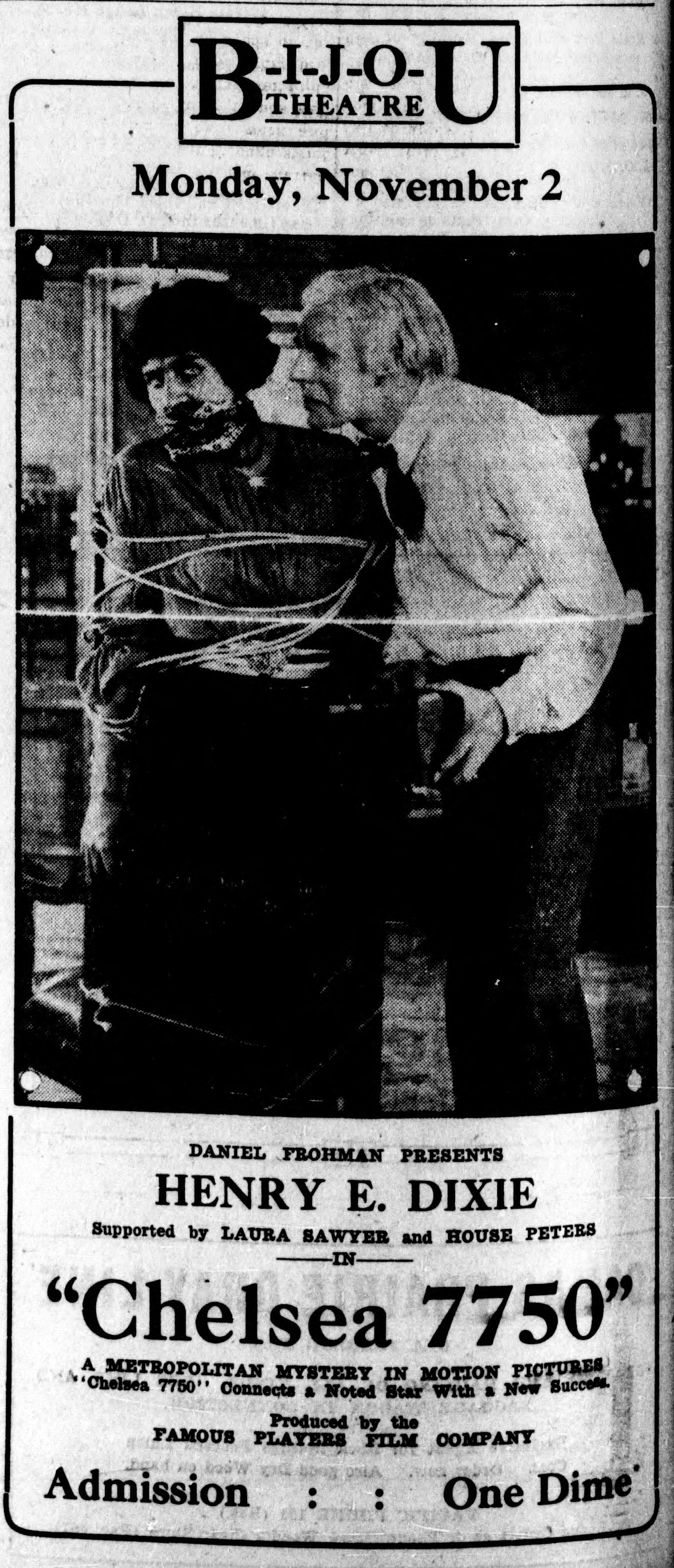
- Newspaper advertisement
- Directed by: J. Searle Dawley
- Written by: J. Searle Dawley
- Produced by: Adolph Zukor; Daniel Frohman
- Starring: Henry E. Dixey; Laura Sawyer
- Cinematography: H. Lyman Broening
- Distributed by: State's Rights
- Release date: September 20, 1913
- Running time: 4 reels
- Country: United States
- Language: Silent (English intertitles)

Chelsea 7750 is a surviving 1913 American silent crime drama film directed by J. Searle Dawley and starring Henry E. Dixey (from the stage), Laura Sawyer, and House Peters. It was the fourth of six "Kate Kirby's Cases" detective stories made in 1913, the first produced by the Famous Players Film Company after Dawley and Sawyer left Edison for Famous Players.

== Cast ==
- Henry E. Dixey as Detective Kirby
- Laura Sawyer as Kirby's Daughter
- House Peters as Professor Grimble
- Martin Faust as Grimble's son

== Preservation status ==
A print is held by the BFI National Film and Television Archive, London.

== Kate Kirby's cases ==
- The Diamond Crown. (Edison – 1913)
- On the Broad Stairway. (Edison – 1913)
- The Substitute Stenographer. (Edison – 1913)
- Chelsea 7750. (Famous Players - 1913)
- An Hour Before Dawn. (Famous Players - 1913)
- The Port of Doom. (Famous Players - 1913)
