= The Battle of Trafalgar (film) =

1911 film

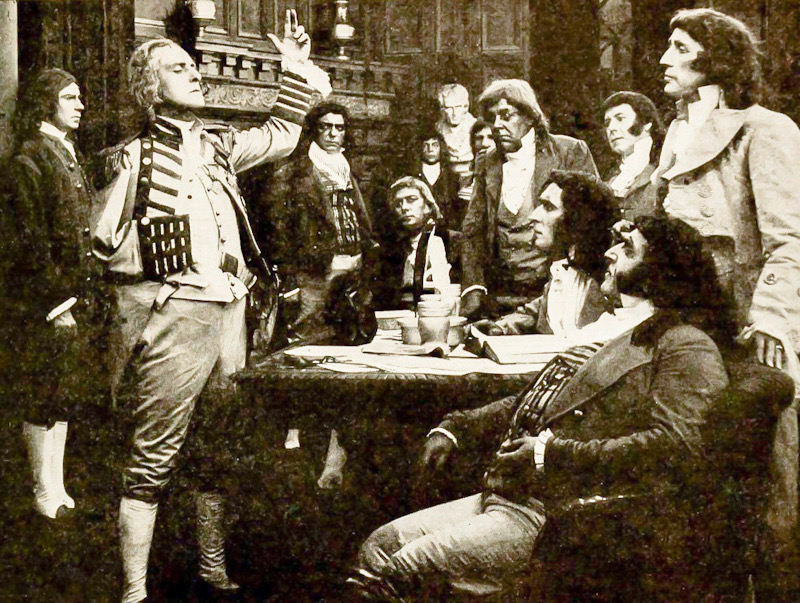
- Film still of Admiral Nelson (Sydney Booth) presenting his battle plan in London
- Directed by: J. Searle Dawley
- Written by: Edwin M. La Roche
- Produced by: Thomas A. Edison, Inc.
- Starring: Sydney Booth
- Cinematography: Henry Cronjager
- Production companies: Edison Studios, The Bronx, New York; United States
- Distributed by: The General Film Company
- Release date: September 22, 1911
- Running time: 1000 feet (approximately 15 minutes)
- Country: United States
- Language: Silent (English intertitles)

The Battle of Trafalgar is a possibly lost 1911 American silent docudrama film that portrayed the 1805 victory of Great Britain’s Royal Navy over the combined naval forces of France and Spain during the Napoleonic Wars. The death of British Vice-Admiral Horatio Nelson in that decisive sea battle was also depicted in this "one-reeler", which was directed by J. Searle Dawley and produced by Thomas A. Edison, Inc. The film starred Sydney Booth with Herbert Prior, James Gordon, Charles Ogle, and Laura Sawyer in supporting roles.

== Plot ==
This film is described in 1911 trade publications as "a powerful historical drama" of the famous battle off the coast of Spain, at Cape Trafalgar, on October 21, 1805. The motion picture's opening scenes, according to plot descriptions in those publications, portrayed Lord Nelson (Sydney Booth) at the Board of Admiralty in London in the weeks prior to the conflict. There he reveals his "wonderful plan of attack" against the French fleet, which was supported by warships of its Spanish ally. After discussing the daring plan, Nelson and his fellow officers raise their drinking glasses to toast King George III and Britain's anticipated success against French Emperor Napoleon Bonaparte's naval forces.

The photoplay then shifted to scenes at sea aboard HMS Victory, Nelson's flagship. It is the day before the battle and officers are writing letters, perhaps their final messages, to their families and sweethearts. Lieutenant Prescott (Herbert Prior) is shown writing his fiancée (Laura Sawyer), who appears as a vision with "beautiful scenic and photographic effect". Advancing to the next day, the film depicted Nelson making a final entry in his personal diary and later on Victory bidding farewell to Captain Hardy (James Gordon) and other officers once the long line of enemy vessels is sighted on the horizon. Next, "splendidly portrayed" in the film, signal flags are hoisted aloft to relay the admiral's own simple but inspiring message to his crews across the British fleet: "England expects that every man will do his duty". Scenes then transitioned to the flagship's decks being cleared for action, followed by footage showing the battle itself with "the firing of the guns", "ships caught on fire", and close-up views of the battered Victory. While the battle is raging, Nelson and Hardy are openly and calmly walking on the quarterdeck giving commands. Suddenly, Nelson drops to his knees, struck down by a musket ball shot by a sniper aboard the adjacent French warship Redoubtable. Mortally wounded, Lord Nelson is quickly carried below decks to the ship's cockpit. There in the film's final scenes, described as replete with "grandeur" and "pathos", the heroic admiral dies, but not until Hardy brings him news of the British fleet's overwhelming defeat of Napoleon's Franco-Spanish fleet.

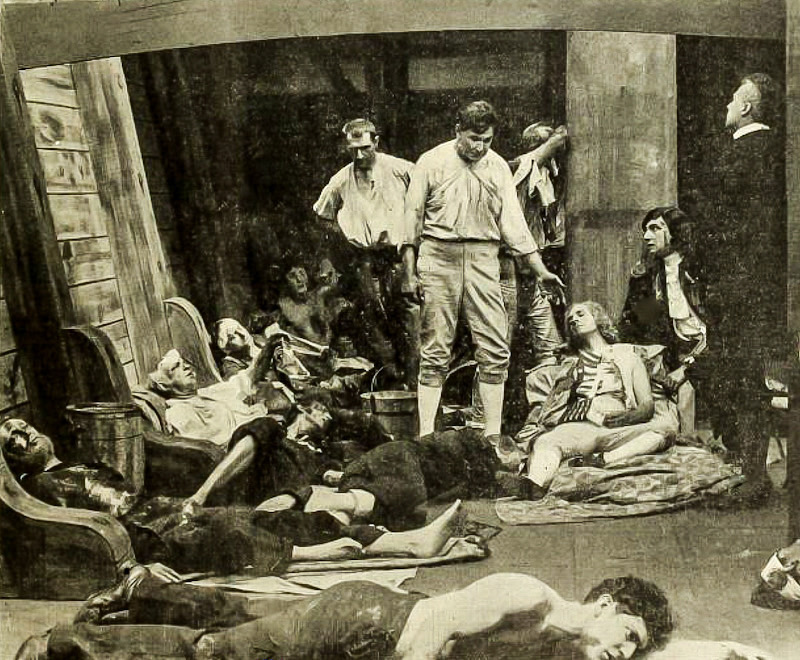
The ship's surgeon (actor Charles Ogle) standing over the dying Nelson (Sydney Booth) with Captain Hardy (James Gordon) kneeling next to him

== Principal cast ==
- Sydney Booth as Admiral Lord Nelson
- James Gordon as Captain Thomas Hardy
- Herbert Prior as Lieutenant Prescott
- Charles Ogle as William Beatty, ship's surgeon on HMS Victory
- Laura Sawyer as Lieutenant Prescott's "Affianced"

== Production ==
The sets for staging the production, including basic replicas of several deck areas on HMS Victory, were built in New York City at Edison Studios, which was located at the intersection of Decatur Avenue and Oliver Place in the Bronx. The extras who performed as crewmen aboard the British flagship and on the French vessel Redoubtable were various Bronx residents hastily gathered by the studio from surrounding neighborhoods. In 1917, Marc McDermott, an Australian actor and featured Edison player at the time of this production's development, recalled how a mistake in a major scene by one of those inexperienced extras or "supers" forced Director J. Searle Dawley to reassemble the cast and crew days after filming to reshoot an entire combat sequence on the Victory set:

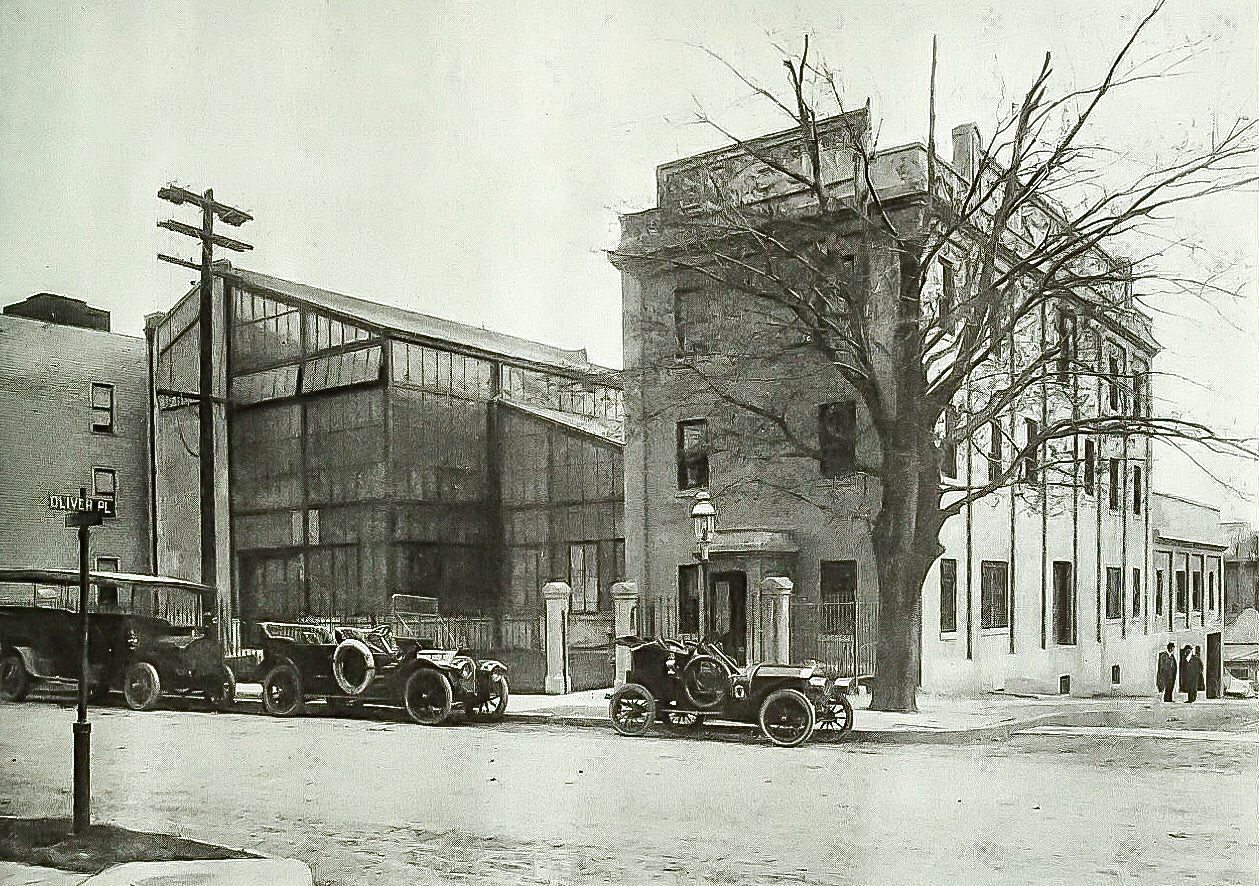
Edison's Bronx facilities where The Battle of Trafalgar was filmed

Dawley had been imploring the extras to register animation and finally, after several rehearsals, ordered the scene taken. A few days later the scene was shown in the studio dark room. Then, for the first time, Dawley was horrified to see an anxious super, standing on the quarterdeck, pick up a papier-mache anchor supposed to weigh something like a ton. With one hand the zealous extra hurled it over the side. There was nothing to do but to retake the whole scene. But the anxious extra wasn't in the retake.

== Release and reception ==
In the months after its release in September 1911, the film received positive reviews both nationally and internationally. The New York-based trade publication The Moving Picture World in its September 9 pre-release review describes the Edison Company's film as "altogether creditable" and expresses admiration for the production's attention to detail in its sets:

The picture has bits of historic realism that are quite clever. The "fighting top" of the enemy's ship "The Redoubtable" was an extremely well conceived and well executed scene and has the merit of being in the story of it well sustained by historical tradition. The scene on board the "Victory" when, after so many hours of bloody fighting the fortunes of war went with the British, is stirring in the picture, as it must have been in reality. The death of Nelson was an affecting scene and to an Englishman must bring to mind one of the proudest moments in the history of his country.

The assessments of the film by The Moving Picture World only continued to improve in later issues of the trade journal. It was so impressed with the "excellent" film that it even promoted the idea of utilizing it in classrooms: "It is a historic picture of unusual educational value and would be useful anywhere in teaching history." Evidently, some learning centers detected the same potential of using the film as a learning tool for young students. In November 1919, more than eight years after the motion picture's release, the public library in Ottawa, Illinois, offered the presentation of The Battle of Trafalgar as part of its "Movies for children" series on Saturday afternoons and promoted it as "a vivid story of Admiral Nelson's last battle, which is full of thrilling scenes."

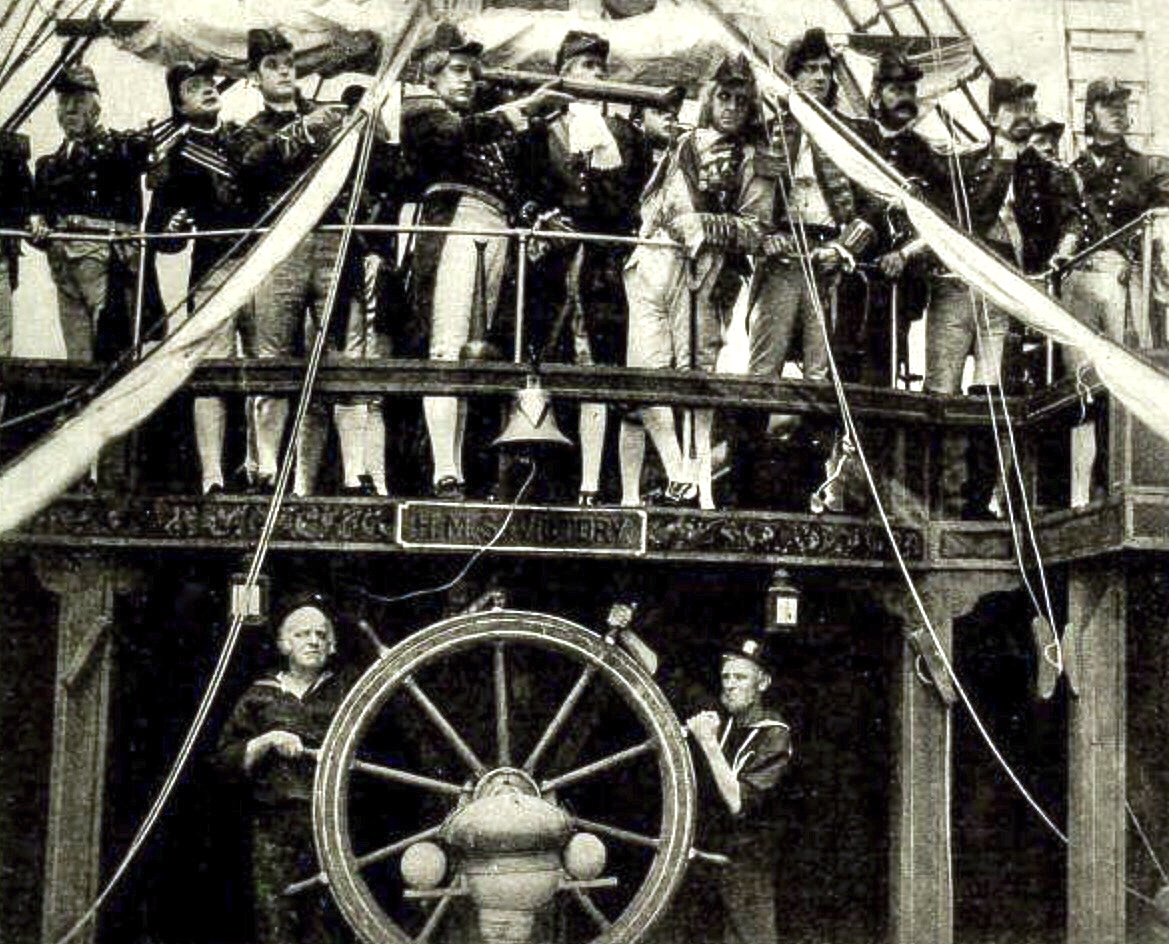
Edison film-set recreation of Nelson (fifth from right) with his officers on poop deck on HMS Victory

A month after the film's release, the "Western Correspondent" for Moving Picture News reported from Arkansas that his wife, who reviewed the picture, thought it "was about the best battle scene and military reel she has looked at in many days", adding that "Because it was historical in character she raved about it." In Chicago, film reviewer Charles A. Young, predicted that The Battle of Trafalgar would have strong appeal in foreign markets, especially in Canada. "The sentiment of the Canadian public", he observed, "is that too much Yankee heroism at present is being exhibited in the animated picture theaters in Canada", noting that "Edison's 'The Battle of Trafalgar,' etc., will be of great interest and value to the Dominion of Canada and England." Young's comment proved to be correct, for by October and November 1911, foreign newspapers were already reporting positive responses to the screen drama's presentation in select theaters in England, Ireland, Wales, and France; and by February 1912 the "spectacular picture" was being screened as far away from Edison Studios as Bombay (now Mumbai), India. It is noteworthy that in marketing The Battle of Trafalgar in France, French distributors changed the film's title to La Mort de l'Amiral Nelson ("The Death of Admiral Nelson").

== "Lost" film status and later British silent productions ==
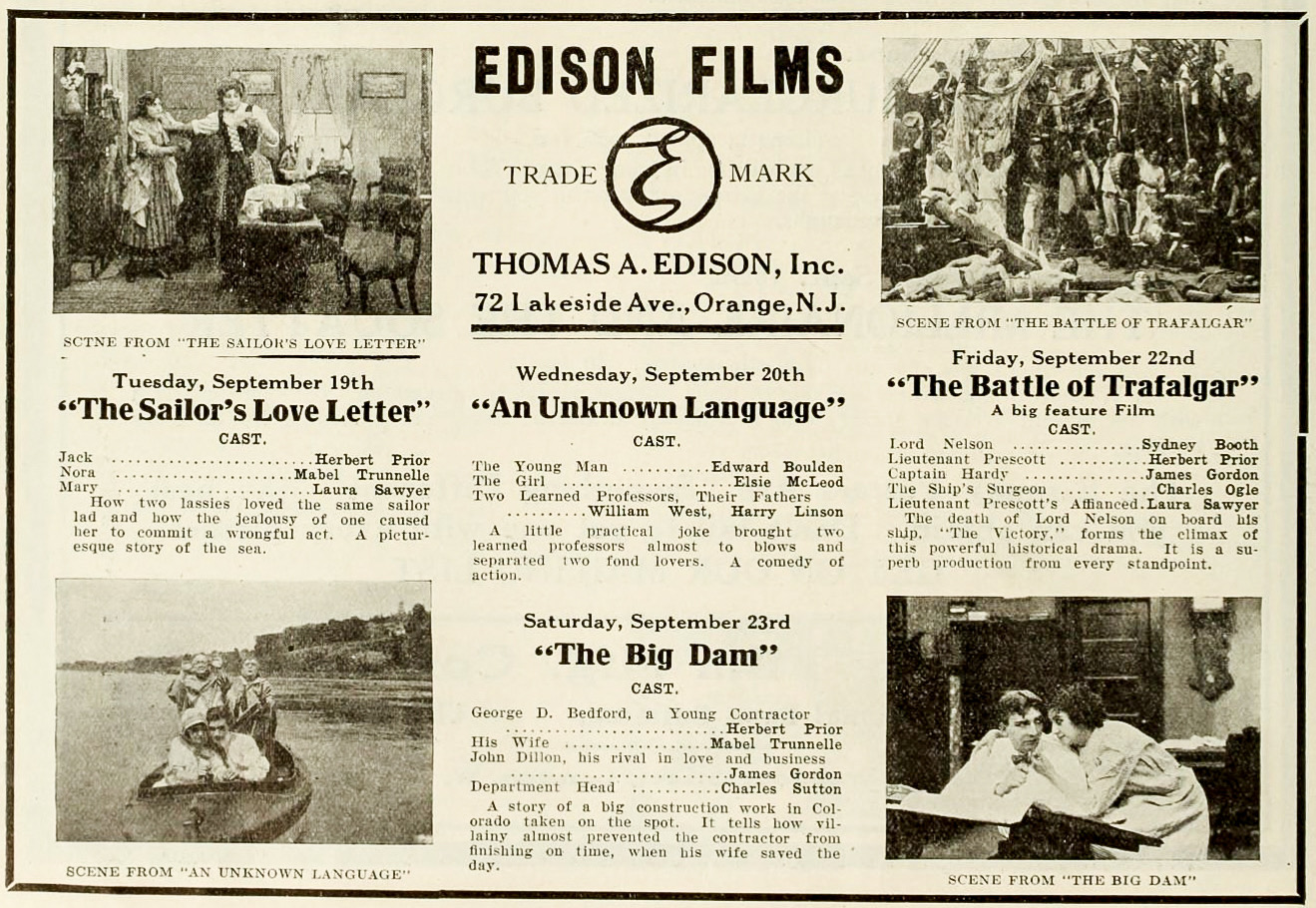
Edison releases, September 1911

No copy of this production is listed in the film collection of the Library of Congress, the UCLA Film Archives, in the collection of moving images at the Museum of Modern Art, the George Eastman Museum, the Library and Archives Canada (LAC), or in other major film repositories in the United States, Canada, or Europe. The film is therefore presumed to be lost. A major fire at Edison's Bronx facilities on March 28, 1914 devastated much of the studio, destroying sets, large collections of costumes, production equipment, and "many moving picture feature films". It is quite possible that any master negatives and prints of The Battle of Trafalgar stored there were among the losses in that fire. However, the film was issued on 22mm safety film stock for the Edison Home Projecting Kinetoscope, and as there has not been a complete archival survey of films in this format, it is possible a copy may still exist.

Later footage from other silent productions that include portrayals of the Battle of Trafalgar should not be confused with this 1911 Edison release. Two of those subsequent releases are much longer, far more elaborate British films. One, titled Nelson; The Story of England's Immortal Naval Hero, is a 1918 two-hour biopic starring Donald Calthrop. The other silent film, also a biopic and simply titled Nelson, is a four-reeler released in 1926. It stars Cedric Hardwicke. Both of these British films survive, and each contains scenes of the 1805 battle that in style and general content are likely very similar to some scenes in this Edison version, including rudimentary special effects that employed the use of miniature models and painted silhouettes of warships, small-scale explosions, and tight camera framing to simulate the opposing fleets bombarding one another.
