= The Relief of Lucknow (film) =

1912 film by J. Searle Dawley

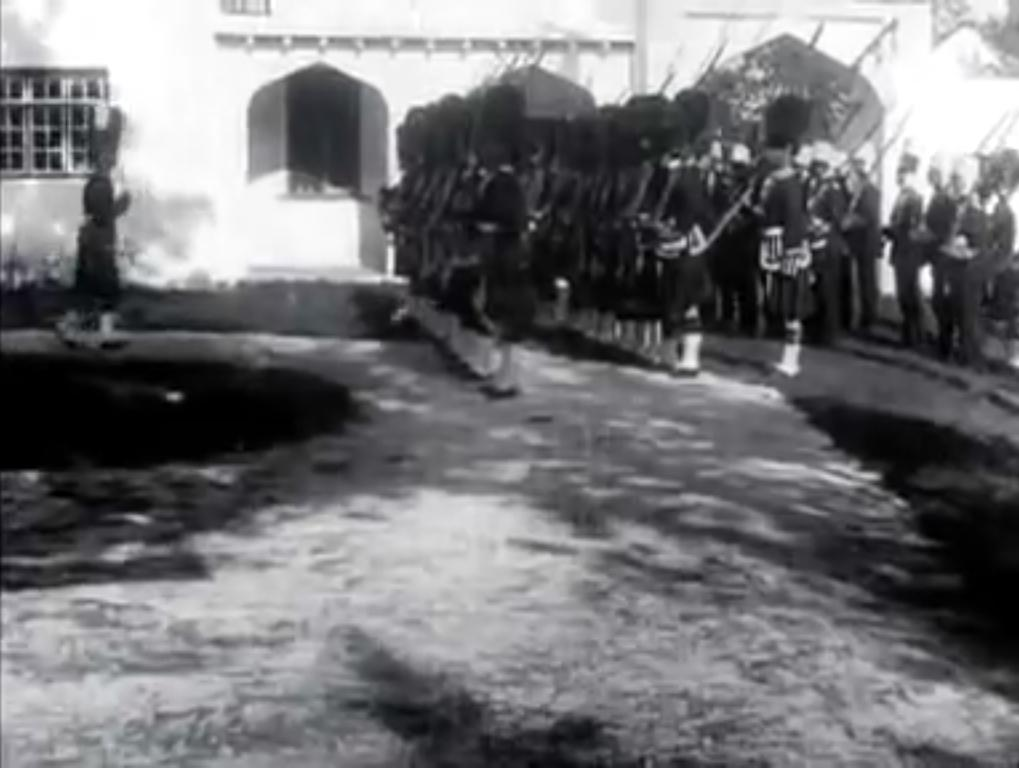
Soldiers from the 2nd Battalion, The Queen's (Royal West Surrey) Regiment, based in Bermuda, playing the role of Scottish Highland infantry in the film (at Walsingham House)

The Relief of Lucknow is a 1912 American silent film about the Relief of Lucknow during the Indian Rebellion of 1857. Filmed in 1911 by the Edison Company at locations in the Imperial fortress colony of Bermuda, including the Prospect Camp Garrison Golf Links clubhouse (originally a private home built around 1700, and now a Bermuda National Trust property named "Palmetto House" due to the still-extant ornamental stand of palmettos visible in front of it in the film), "Walsingham House" (an historic home built in 1652 that is currently the location of the "Tom Moore's Tavern" restaurant), and the walled streets of St. George's town.

The director was J. Searle Dawley, who relocated to Bermuda with a crew in 1911 and 1912, and the production was based at "Villa Monticello", an estate near to Flatts Village. The film makers received considerable assistance from the Bermuda Garrison of the British Army, with the 2nd Battalion of The Queen's (Royal West Surrey) Regiment providing extras. The film was released in 1912. The Imperial fortress colony of Bermuda and its garrison was also used as the location for another Edison film, For Valour, in which two army officers vie for the affections of a Bermudian woman during the Second Boer War. Dawley would return to Bermuda in 1920 to film A Virgin Paradise with Pearl White. One of Daley's crew, James Gordon, returned to Bermuda in 1914 with Victory Photoplay Company to film "The Viking" and "The Mystery of the Poison Pool", both starring Betty Harte. The 2nd Battalion of the Lincolnshire Regiment, which had replaced the 2nd Battalion of the Queen's in January, 1914, provided soldiers as extras for the first film.
