= The Charge of the Light Brigade (1912 film) =

1912 American film

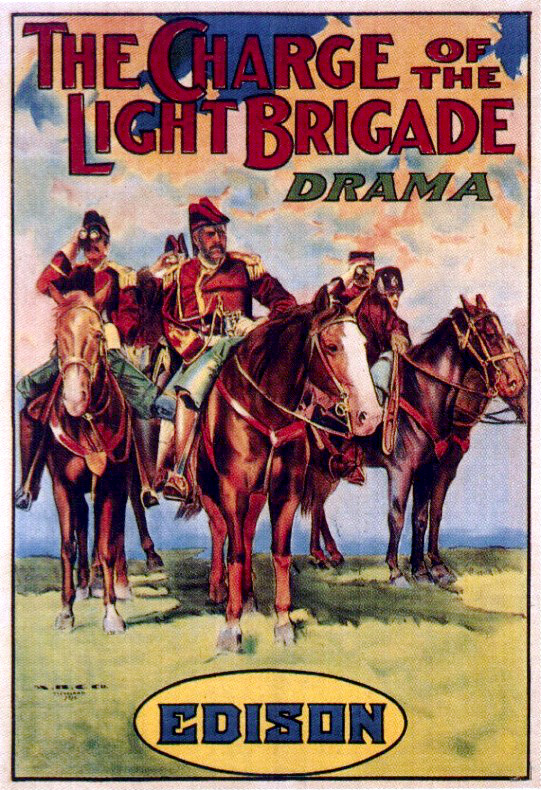
- The 1912 theatrical poster with actor James Gordon (center) as Lord Raglan, the one-armed commander-in-chief of British forces
- Directed by: J. Searle Dawley
- Screenplay by: J. Searle Dawley
- Based on: Poem by Alfred, Lord Tennyson
- Produced by: Thomas A. Edison, Inc.
- Starring: Richard Neill; Benjamin Wilson; James Gordon; Charles Sutton
- Production company: Edison Studios
- Distributed by: The General Film Company
- Release date: October 11, 1912
- Running time: 1 reel, 1025 feet at initial release (15 minutes) (Note: According to the reference How Movies Work by Bruce F. Kawin (New York: Macmillan Publishing Company, 1987, pp. 46-47), a full 1000-foot reel of film in the silent era had a maximum running time of 15 minutes. While silent-film speeds varied, they were generally projected at 16 frames per second, much slower than the 24 frames of later sound films.)
- Country: United States
- Languages: Silent, English intertitles

The Charge of the Light Brigade is a 1912 American silent historical drama film directed by J. Searle Dawley (1877-1949). Produced by the Edison Studios, the film portrays the disastrous yet inspiring military attack in October 1854 by British light cavalry against Imperial Russian artillery positions in the Battle of Balaclava during the Crimean War (1854-1856), in the Crimea of southern Russia along the Black Sea coast. Director Dawley also wrote the scenario for this production, adapting it in part from the famous 1854 narrative poem about the charge by British poet laureate Alfred, Lord Tennyson (1809-1892), who completed his poem just six weeks after the actual battle event. The film's action scenes and landscape footage were shot between late August and early September 1912, while Dawley and his company of players and crew were on location in Cheyenne, Wyoming. In order to produce a sizable and believable recreation of the charge, the director needed a very large number of horsemen. Fortunately for Dawley, the commander of United States Army cavalry at Fort D. A. Russell at Cheyenne agreed to provide "about 800" mounted Army Cavalry troopers and "their trained mounts" to the Edison filming project of the new cinematic invention.

The film was originally released in American cinemas on October 11, 1912, and four years later rereleased under a renewed copyright by Thomas Edison, Inc. An 11-minute print of that 1916 rerelease survives, copies of which can be viewed today on various streaming services.

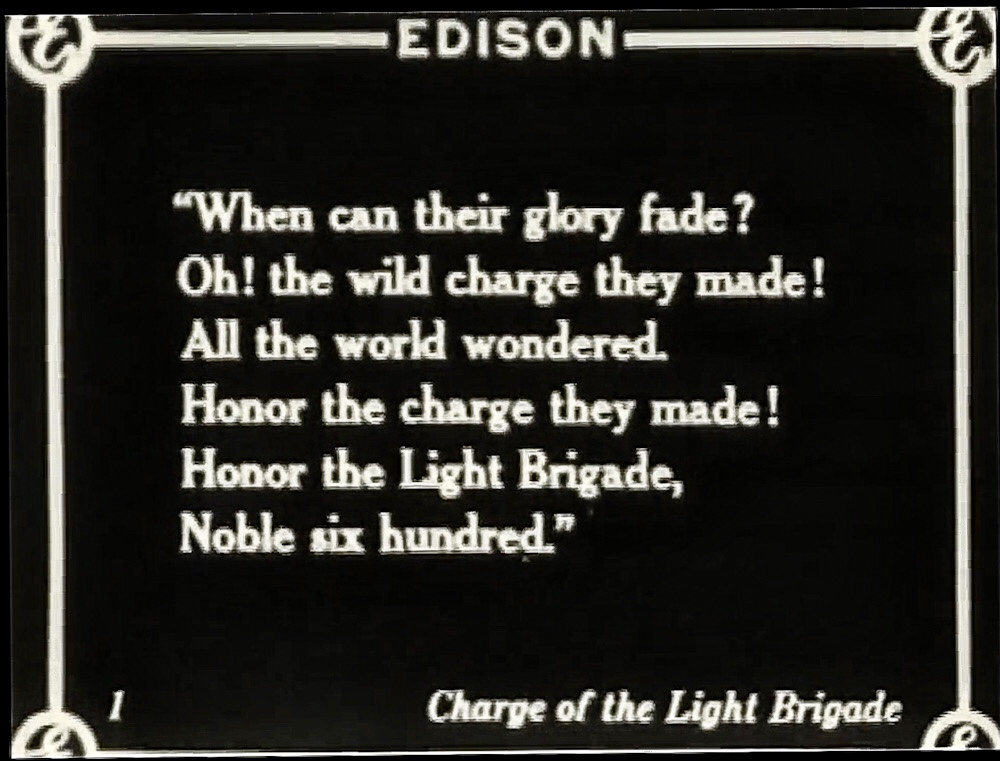
Intertitles with verses from Lord Tennyson's 1854 poem are presented throughout the film.

== Plot ==
The film opens with two young British cavalry officers, Captain William Morris and Captain Louis Nolan, leaving home and bidding farewell to their wives in the parlor of the Nolans' residence. After the men leave the room, the film cuts to scenes much later in a British encampment in the Crimea, near the small harbor town of Balaklava, where Morris and Nolan are writing letters as fellow troopers assemble the evening before the battle. (Note: The preferred spelling today for the noted Crimean town is "Balaklava”, although war-related documents from the period and historical references regarding the battle there almost universally cite the town "Balaclava".) Scenes then depict cavalry units preparing for action the next day. Lord Raglan, the one-armed commander-in-chief of Britain's Crimean forces, is portrayed on horseback issuing orders of engagement as he surveys the terrain and Russian troop positions. The film then depicts Captain Nolan taking Raglan's orders and riding to relay them to George Bingham, the Earl of Lucan, who commands the army's cavalry division. Lucan, also on horseback, is forward in the field and is scanning the enemy as well. When he delivers the orders, Nolan appears to gesture in the general direction of Russian batteries guarding the end of the valley instead of toward Raglan's intended objective, captured British guns positioned elsewhere.

Despite the mix-up in Raglan's orders, Lucan commands his subordinate Lord Cardigan, to lead a full charge of his light brigade into the valley, which is heavily fortified on three sides by lines of Russian cannons. Cardigan and his 673 men dutifully obey the order even though their mission appears to be a near-suicidal task, offering little chance of success. Drawing sabres and lowering their lances, the troopers charge. The film now portrays Captain Nolan rushing to halt the misdirected charge once he realizes the mistake, but he is knocked from his horse by cannon fire and killed. A carnage now ensues with the brigade being mauled by the Russian guns. Scenes simulating dead horses and riders lying on the field are shown, intended to represent the devastating losses suffered by the brigade in the 1854 charge. The attack manages to overrun temporarily a few Russian artillery positions, but achieves no tactical advantage. Ultimately, the attack by the "Noble six hundred" ended with 298 of their number either being killed, wounded or captured, and nearly 400 horses lost. The film closes with the battered survivors of the British brigade returning to their lines and being cheered for their bravery by their fellow soldiers.

== Cast ==
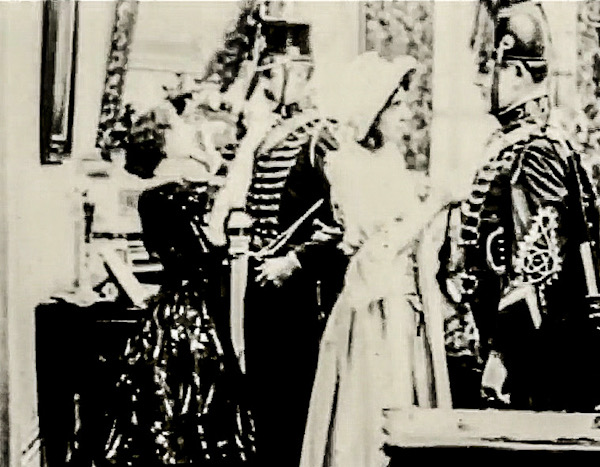
Captain Nolan (Neill, center) and Captain Morris (Wilson) bid farewell to their wives (uncredited actresses)

- Richard Neill as Captain Louis Nolan
- Benjamin Wilson as Captain William Morris
- James Gordon as Lord Raglan, commander-in-chief of the British forces
- Charles Sutton as Lord Lucan, commander of the British cavalry division
- Uncredited actor as Lord Cardigan, leader of the charge
- Uncredited actresses as Mrs. Nolan and Mrs. Morris

== Production ==
In order for Edison Studios to produce in 1912 a large, believable recreation of the famous charge, director J. Searle Dawley made arrangements with the commander of Fort D. A. Russell near Cheyenne, Wyoming to have between 750 and 800 of his federal troopers to perform as British cavalry units and as Russian artillery crews and supporting infantry. Fort Russell at that time was among the largest cavalry bases in the United States Army. The rolling, largely barren hillsides on Fort Russell's military reservation proved to be an ideal setting for filming, offering Dawley a terrain that in its general appearance looks very similar to the Crimean landscape where the 1854 cavalry charge occurred.

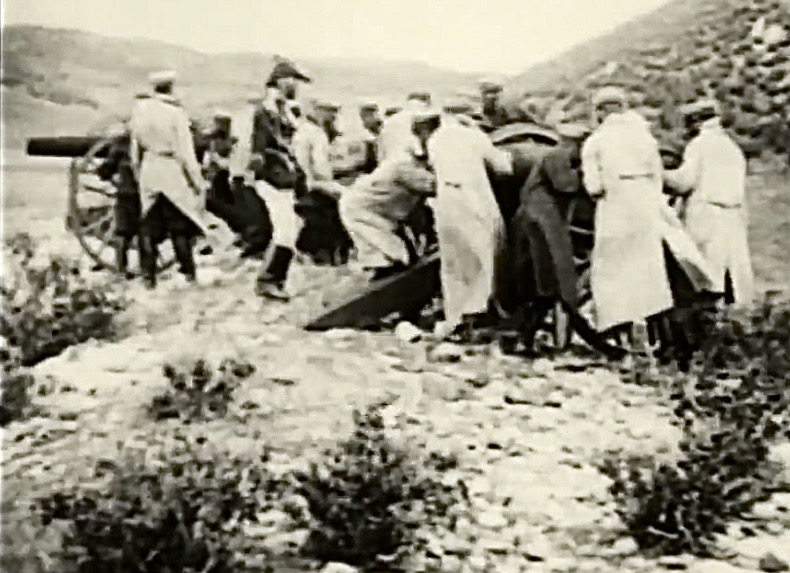
United States Army cavalry troops also played Russian cannon crews.

During the six years that Dawley worked for Edison, between 1907 and 1913, he directed over 200 "one-reelers". Most of those film projects were completed in a matter of days at Edison's main studio in the Bronx in New York City; however, The Charge of the Light Brigade required considerably more production time due to the logistics of shooting on location in Wyoming, the filming of action scenes with hundreds of mounted troops, and costuming many of those riders with reproductions of British cavalry uniforms and weapons from the 1850s. Reviewers of the film after its release, including reviewers and army veterans in England, complimented "the historical accuracy of the uniforms and accessories". According to news reports trade publications, the uniforms used in the film "were made to order from authentic military authorities in London."

The interior footage in the film's opening scene, which portrays Nolan and Morris bidding farewell to their wives, was likely shot at Edison's New York studio before Dawley and his company of actors and crew traveled cross country to Wyoming, which formed only one part of an "extensive picture making tour" destined for California. (Note: Location shooting in Wyoming was just one of multiple projects that Dawley carried out during his company's transcontinental trip in the summer and early fall of 1912. He and his players and crew meandered in their journey to various locations between New York City and Long Beach, California, where Edison intended to continue development of a West Coast studio. The demands of Dawley's other work during that time makes it highly probable that this film's opening sequence was shot in New York at Edison's Bronx studio before he and his company departed for California.) That opening sequence was then spliced into the Cheyenne footage to create the film's final cut before its release in October 1912. In assembling that final cut, Edison film editors also placed at various points in the footage intertitles or text cards that identify the main characters and present verses from Lord Tennyson's poem.

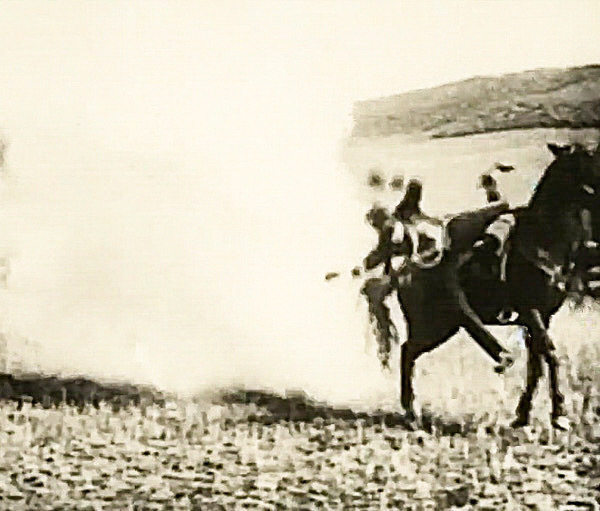
Scene in which actor Richard Neill broke his arm after falling off his horse in a staged explosion

Filming the charge in Wyoming was not done without injuries. Richard Neill, as Captain Nolan, was one cast member who was hurt. During his character's death scene, he reportedly "fell so realistically" from his horse that he broke his upper arm when he hit the ground. (Note: Accounts vary regarding actor Richard Neill's injury during production. Some reports describe it simply as a broken arm; one news item, as "his shoulder bone". It could be surmised from those varying reports that Neill likely fractured his humerus, the upper bone of his arm, above the elbow and near his shoulder.) Neill was described at the time in the motion picture industry as a "popular young Edison 'dare-devil'". One of several trade references to the accident stated that since no attending physician was present at the filming, the spunky actor "set the bone himself, against the pommel of his saddle". That incident would be remembered in the entertainment media. Later, in 1913, The New York Clipper in a news item about Neill stated, "He will be remembered as the cavalry officer who 'broke his arm while being killed' in 'The Charge of the Light Brigade.'"

== Release and reception ==
The motion picture was officially released in the United States on October 11, 1912, and was generally well received across the country by both reviewers and theatergoers. Two weeks afternoon the film's release, the Midwest correspondent for The Moving Picture World reported it as "a tremendous hit in Chicago theaters", adding "Great applause has greeted its presentation at all houses where it has been shown." Edison's release even proved to be highly popular in England, where an American attempt to portray British military history on screen would usually be greeted by reviewers with contempt if not dismissed entirely. Edison, in fact, sold no less than 309 reels of the film for distribution in England, and reviews there were quite positive. In its October 1912 issue, The Cinema News and Property Gazette, a popular trade paper published in London, headlines its opinion of Edison's production as a "Triumph", and after seeing a preview, the paper commends the film, especially for its realism:

To the Edison Company belongs the credit of having filmed the greatest of battle pictures....Now on October 25th they are to release [in England] "The Charge of the Light Brigade", length 1,025 feet, which in a sentence we may describe as the company's bon mot....As we sit enthralled before the screen, so vivid and realistic has the Edison Company made this picture we become participants in that ride to death or glory of the Light Brigade...Accurate in the most minute detail, we are bound to pronounce The Charge of the Light Brigade as this company's biggest triumph.

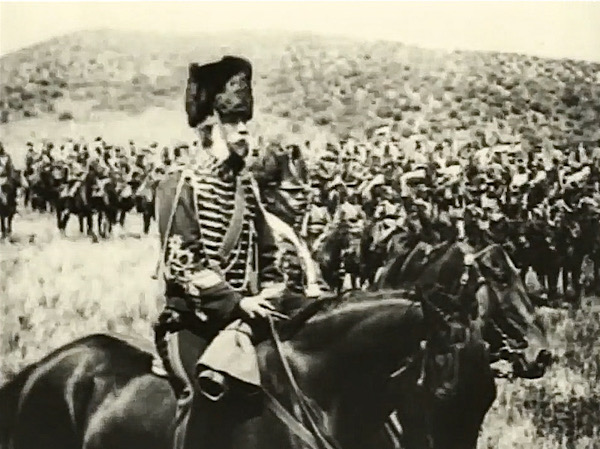
Lord Cardigan (uncredited performer) prepares to lead his brigade into the "Valley of Death".

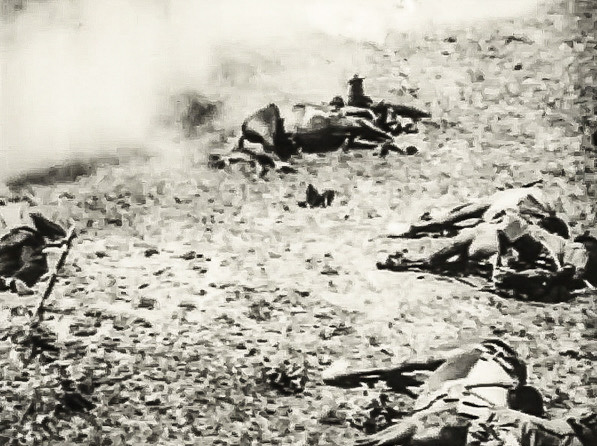
Edison's portrayal of the charge's aftermath.

Elsewhere in Europe and in the British Empire, the American film continued to be well received in the months after its release. The picture by December 1912 was being successfully marketed in Germany under the title Der Todesritt bei Balaklava ("The Death Ride at Balaklava"). In Bombay (now Mumbai), The Times of India in its January 25, 1913, issue declares the Edison motion picture "magnificent" and ranks it as "one of the best war-films yet given to the public." Perhaps, however, the most gratifying praise received by Edison was a letter written to the company by T. H. Roberts, the founder of the "Balaclava Survivors' Fund" in England, a fund that was established to support the financial needs of the small, dwindling number of veterans of the 1854 charge. Portions of Roberts' letter to the Edison Manufacturing Company (Note: Edison Manufacturing Company (EMC) in 1912 was still the parent company, at least on paper, of Edison Studios; however, EMC's operations and assets had been restructured and transferred to Thomas A. Edison, Inc. in 1911. Refer to company history in the "Thomas A. Edison Papers" at School of Arts and Sciences, Rutgers University, Piscataway, New Jersey.) are quoted in the November 1912 issue of the London trade journal The Cinema News and Property Gazette:

"I write to thank you heartily for the great treat you gave me in affording me a private view of your magnificent film of 'The Balaclava Light Brigade Charge.'
"Intimately acquainted, as I have been for the past fifteen years, with the survivors of the Charge, I took a keen interest in watching the development of your wonderful series of pictures. The faithful portraits of the leaders—Raglan, Cardigan and Nolan—the historical accuracy of the uniforms and accessories, and the completeness of the whole presentment renders this to me the most marvelous motion-picture I have ever seen."

== Rerelease, 1916 ==
After renewing the copyright for this production in 1915, Thomas A. Edison, Incorporated rereleased the motion picture in the United States the following year, on June 14. The film during it second run continued to please critics and to resonate with American audiences. Marion Howard, a correspondent for the New York-based trade magazine The Moving Picture World shared with his readers the reaction to the film by a theatergoer in Boston in the weeks after its rerelease:

As a filler at the Fenway we had the pleasure of seeing "The Charge of the Light Brigade," done splendidly by the Edison Company. There was some wonderful horsemanship and the military spirit, also that of sacrifice, was clearly shown with no exaggeration. The titles bore the actual verses of the stirring poem, and I should call this a good picture to show—one that will live.

== Surviving copies of the film ==
A 1916 reprint of the film survives, as well as various modern video copies made from that reprint. While the original 1912 release was produced on 35mm film stock with a running length of 1025 feet or approximately 15 minutes, the surviving 1916 reprint is in a 16mm format with a running time of slightly over 11 minutes. Even allowing for projection-speed variations between the two film stocks, the noted time difference indicates that a portion of the original footage may be missing from the 1916 reprint. (Note: The website Silent Era identifies the surviving 16mm print as a copy of the "1915 rerelease version". Actually, the 1912 film was recopyrighted by Edison in 1915 and then rereleased as new prints by the company on June 14, 1916. The site also cites October 10, 1912 as the release date of the original film, while all referenced 1912 trade journals and papers give October 11 as the date.) A digital copy of the 1916 reprint is available on streaming services such as YouTube.
