= An Hour Before Dawn (film) =

- Directed by: J. Searle Dawley
- Produced by: Adolph Zukor
- Distributed by: State's Rights
- Release date: October 20, 1913
- Running time: 4 reels
- Country: USA
- Language: Silent with English titles

An Hour Before Dawn is a lost 1913 silent film detective drama directed by J. Searle Dawley and starring Laura Sawyer and House Peters. It was the fifth of six "Kate Kirby's Cases" detective stories made in 1913, the second produced by the Famous Players Film Company after Dawley and Sawyer left Edison for Famous Players.

== Cast ==
- Laura Sawyer as Kate Kirby
- House Peters as Kate's father, the Ex-Detective
- Edward Earle as Professor Wallace, the Inventor
- William C. Chamberlin as Richard Wallace as the Son

== Kate Kirby's cases ==
- The Diamond Crown. (Edison – 1913)
- On the Broad Stairway. (Edison – 1913)
- The Substitute Stenographer. (Edison – 1913)
- Chelsea 7750. (Famous Players - 1913)
- An Hour Before Dawn. (Famous Players - 1913)
- The Port of Doom. (Famous Players - 1913)
