= The Old Monk's Tale =

1913 film

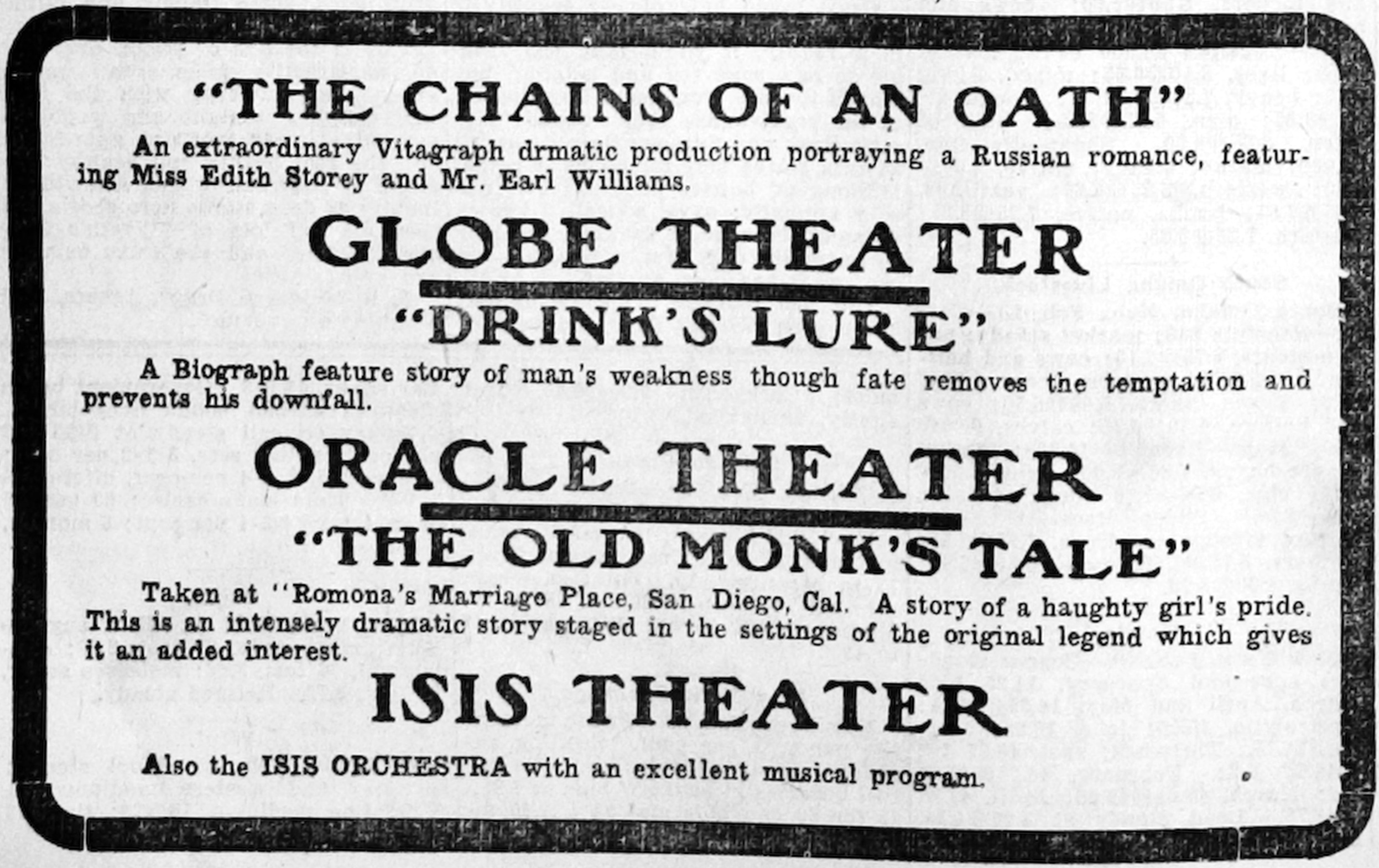
- A contemporary newspaper advertisement for several films, including The Old Monk's Tale.
- Directed by: J. Searle Dawley
- Starring: Ben F. Wilson
- Music by: Beethoven, Chopin
- Production company: Edison Manufacturing Company
- Distributed by: General Film Company
- Release date: February 15, 1913
- Running time: 10 minutes
- Country: United States
- Language: Silent with English intertitles

The Old Monk's Tale is a 1913 American silent drama film directed by J. Searle Dawley, produced by The Edison Company and released by General Film Company. It features the first known film appearance of Harold Lloyd as an uncredited Yaqui Indian at a party.

== Plot ==
According to a film magazine, "The tale deals with a dark-eyed beauty of Spanish blood who had won heart after heart and has put them all aside because they did not bring her a lap full of jewels. A stranger fell under her spell and although she knew that he bad won her heart yet she would not surrender herself until he had secured the jewels she so long sought.

Another fair Senorita, who was jealous of the attentions that the gallant paid to the coquette one day, creeping close to the stranger, told him where he could get the jewels his sweetheart longed for.

He at first laughed at the idea, but the seed of evil had been planted and something slowly crept into his soul, and going out into the night he wended his way to the mission by the sea and took the jewels that decorated the neck of the Madonna. Then he fell at the feet of his loved one and tossed into her lap the jewels, but before his eyes there was a haunted dread.

At a ball given by the Governor there was laughter and gaiety. The coquette was in all her glory; ropes of pearls hung from her neck and the stranger stood pale and calm beside her. Suddenly above the joy and mirth a cry sounded and the voice of a certain priest was heard. His voice rang out in denunciation of a crime, a theft, a desecration of their altars. The place was in a tumult and threats of vengeance were in the air. Hot words, a struggle and the guilty lovers escaped through a window. Out along the path to the sea they went. A moment's pause upon the brink and a shot rang out which ended the life of the guilty lover. The heartbreaker saw the body of her lover sink into the waves and a moment later she leaped after him. So ends the tale told by the old monk at the mission by the sea."

== Cast ==
- Ben F. Wilson as The Handsome Stranger (as Benjamin Wilson)
- Laura Sawyer as Ramona, The Coquette
- James Gordon as Allesandro
- Charles Sutton as The Monk
- Jessie McAllister as The Temptress
- Harold Lloyd as Yaqui Indian (bit part) (uncredited)

== See also ==
- Harold Lloyd filmography
