= Hulda of Holland =

1913 film

- Directed by: J. Searle Dawley
- Written by: Charles Menges
- Starring: Ben F. Wilson
- Production company: Edison Studios
- Distributed by: General Film Company
- Release date: April 21, 1913
- Country: United States
- Language: Silent with English intertitles

Hulda of Holland is a 1913 American silent short drama film directed by J. Searle Dawley. Harold Lloyd appears in an uncredited role.

== Plot ==
According to a film magazine, "Hulda and Heintz are bashful, giggling lovers, but their spooning opportunities are few, as well as being forbidden. One day they get a chance to spoon, but the village gossip sees them and hastens to Hulda's mother, exaggerating what she saw. Hulda gets a curtain lecture, but pleads for Heintz. Heintz is then allowed to call. The lovers become engaged. As the wedding day approaches Hulda dons her wedding dress and goes to show it to her lame grandmother, who cannot be present at the ceremony. The village gossip's husband is a dyke-tender. A great storm is raging while he lies drunk. The land is in danger of flood. Hulda disappears and the village gossip starts another scandal about her eloping with a minister. When the wedding hour arrives Hulda is missing. After a search she is found, bedraggled and covered with mud. While the dyke-tender lay drunk she had been stopping a hole in the dyke with her bare hands and thereby saves the country."

== Cast ==
- Ben F. Wilson as Heintz
- Laura Sawyer as Hulda
- Jessie McAllister as the village gossip
- Charles Sutton
- Harold Lloyd as Bit Role (uncredited)

== See also ==
- Harold Lloyd filmography
