= Herbert Prior =

English actor

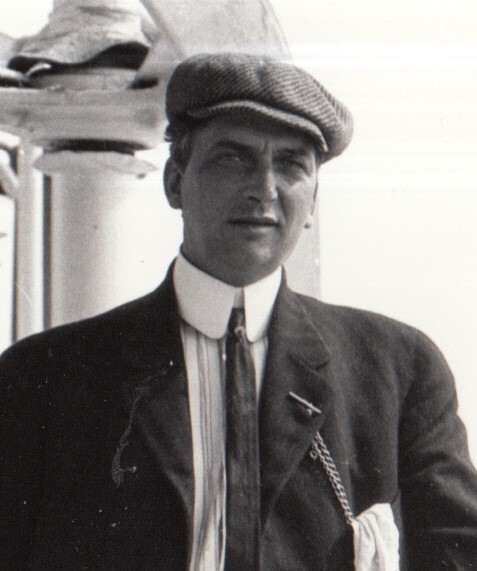
- Born: 2 July 1867; Oxford, Oxfordshire, England
- Died: 3 October 1954 (aged 87); Los Angeles, California, USA
- Occupation: Actor
- Years active: 1908–34
- Spouse: Mabel Trunnelle

Herbert Prior (2 July 1867 – 3 October 1954) was an English silent film actor. He appeared in more than 260 films between 1908 and 1934. He was born in Oxford, Oxfordshire, and died in Los Angeles, California.

Prior was married to actress Mabel Trunnelle.

== Selected filmography ==
- After Many Years (1908)
- At the Altar (1909)
- A Drunkard's Reformation (1909)
- Lady Helen's Escapade (1909)
- The Lonely Villa (1909)
- A Sound Sleeper (1909)
- A Burglar's Mistake (1909)
- Two Memories (1909)
- The Battle of Trafalgar (1911)
- The Lighthouse by the Sea (1911)
- The Lesser Evil (1912)
- The Substitute Stenographer (1913)
- Eugene Aram (1915)
- Miss George Washington (1916)
- The Heart of the Hills (1916)
- The Poor Little Rich Girl (1917)
- The Bottom of the Well (1917)
- The Last Sentence (1917)
- Mrs. Leffingwell's Boots (1918)
- The Model's Confession (1918)
- A Burglar for a Night (1918)
- After His Own Heart (1919)
- The Love Hunger (1919)
- Society for Sale (1919)
- Her Kingdom of Dreams (1919)
- Heartsease (1919)
- That's Good (1919)
- The Poor Simp (1920)
- The Little 'Fraid Lady (1920)
- The House of Whispers (1920)
- Stronger Than Death (1920)
- Made in Heaven (1921)
- Not Guilty (1921)
- Without Benefit of Clergy (1921)
- Garments of Truth (1921)
- The Snowshoe Trail (1922)
- The Half Breed (1922)
- The Man from Downing Street (1922)
- Garrison's Finish (1923)
- Little Johnny Jones (1923)
- Slave of Desire (1923)
- The Taming of the West (1925)
- The Wild Bull's Lair (1925)
- Tearing Through (1925)
- The Monster (1925)
- The Fighting Demon (1925)
- The Better Man (1926)
- Why Girls Go Back Home (1926)
- Rustling for Cupid (1926)
- Doubling with Danger (1926)
- The Midnight Kiss (1926)
- Blake of Scotland Yard (1927)
- All At Sea (1929)
- The Duke Steps Out (1929)
- The Winged Horseman (1929)
- The Ace of Scotland Yard (1929)
- Paid (1930)
- Student Tour (1934)
