= The Port of Doom =

- Directed by: J. Searle Dawley
- Written by: J. Searle Dawley
- Produced by: Daniel Frohman; Adolph Zukor
- Starring: Laura Sawyer; House Peters
- Distributed by: State Rights
- Release date: November 20, 1913
- Running time: 4 reels
- Country: USA
- Language: Silent with English titles

The Port of Doom is a lost 1913 silent film detective drama directed by J. Searle Dawley and featuring Laura Sawyer and House Peters. It was the last of six "Kate Kirby's Cases" detective stories made in 1913, the third produced by the Famous Players Film Company after Dawley and Sawyer left Edison for Famous Players.

== Cast ==
- Laura Sawyer as Kate Kirby
- House Peters as Kate's Father
- David Wall as Fuller (*as Dave Wall)
- Peter Lang as Fornton
- Hattie Forsythe as Vera Fornton
- Hal Clarendon as Capt. Giles
- Henrietta Goodman as Fuller's Wife

== Kate Kirby's cases ==
- The Diamond Crown. (Edison – 1913)
- On the Broad Stairway. (Edison – 1913)
- The Substitute Stenographer. (Edison – 1913)
- Chelsea 7750. (Famous Players - 1913)
- An Hour Before Dawn. (Famous Players - 1913)
- The Port of Doom. (Famous Players - 1913)
