= A Virgin Paradise =

1921 film by J. Searle Dawley

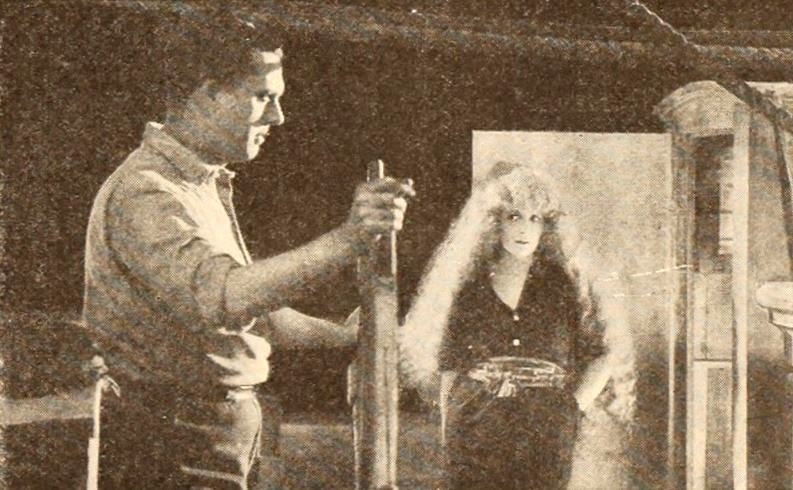
- Film still showing Bob (Robert Elliott) and Gratia (Pearl White) aboard ship
- Directed by: J. Searle Dawley
- Written by: Hiram Percy Maxim (story)
- Produced by: William Fox
- Starring: Pearl White
- Cinematography: Joseph Ruttenberg; Bert Dawley
- Distributed by: Fox Film Corporation
- Release date: September 4, 1921 (USA)
- Running time: 80 minutes; 8 reels
- Country: United States
- Language: Silent (English intertitles)

A Virgin Paradise is a lost 1921 American silent adventure film produced and distributed by Fox Film Corporation and starring serial queen Pearl White, for who it had been written by her friend Hiram Percy Maxim. It was directed by veteran director J. Searle Dawley, and filmed near Harrington Sound in the British Imperial fortress colony of Bermuda, 640 miles off North Carolina where Searle had previously filmed The Relief of Lucknow and For Valour in 1912. Animals, including monkeys and lions, were imported for the production. On 21 December 1920, Dawley received a cable at 8:25 AM at the Princess Hotel urging that White, who had previously visited Bermuda in 1913, leave Bermuda that day for New York aboard the RMS Fort Victoria. As the ship had already departed from the City of Hamilton, she was flown by a seaplane of the Bermuda and West Atlantic Aviation Company from the Princess Hotel to board the ship at Murray's Anchorage before it passed through Hurd's channel onto the open Atlantic Ocean. White was photographed boarding the seaplane by the proprietors of the Bermuda and West Atlantic Aviation Company, Major Henry Hamilton "Hal" Kitchener (the son of Lieutenant-General Sir Frederick Walter Kitchener) and Major Harold Hemming.

== Cast ==
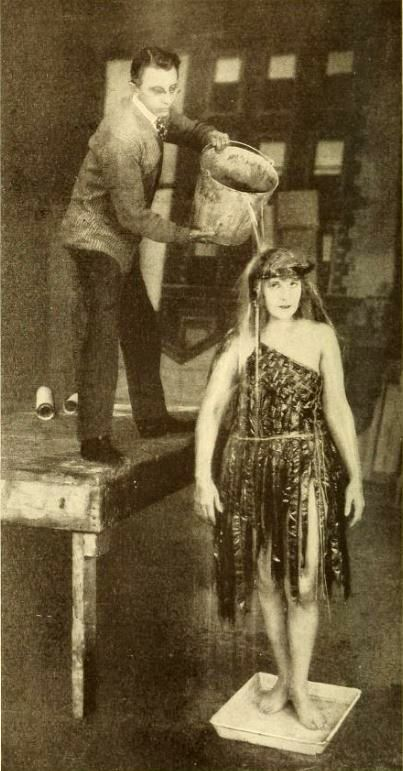
J. Searle Dawley pre-soaks Pearl for a scene

- Pearl White as Gratia Latham
- Robert Elliott as Bob Alan
- Jack Baston as Slim (credited as J. Thornton Baston)
- Alan Edwards as Bernard Holt
- Henrietta Floyd as Mrs. Holt
- Grace Beaumont as Constance Holt
- Mary Beth Barnelle as Ruth Hastings
- Lynn Pratt as The Attorney
- Lewis Sealy as Peter Latham (credited as Lewis Seeley)
- Charles Sutton as Captain Mulhall
- Hal Clarendon as John Latham

== See also ==
- 1937 Fox vault fire
