= The Girl of the Gypsy Camp =

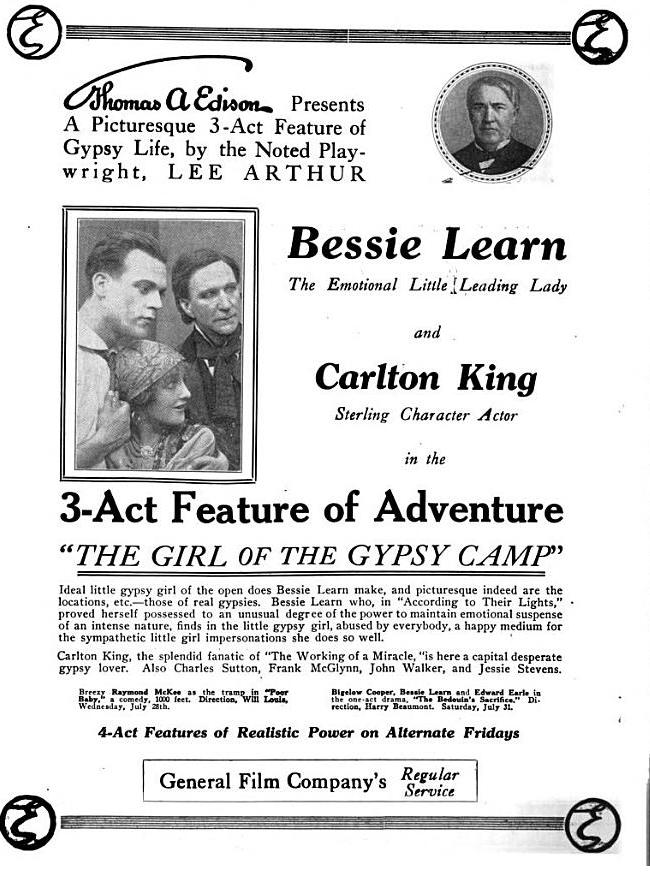
- Ad for the film
- Directed by: Langdon West
- Written by: Lee Arthur
- Starring: Bessie Learn, Carlton King
- Production company: Edison Company
- Distributed by: General Film Company
- Release date: July 30, 1915
- Languages: Silent; English intertitles

The Girl of the Gypsy Camp, from Edison Studios, is a three-act silent film written by Lee Arthur and directed by Langdon West. The film was released on July 30, 1915.

== Cast ==
- Harry Eytinge as Sam
- Carlton S. King as Franko, Rigo's son
- Bessie Learn as Romono (Joy Randolph)
- Henry Leoni as Rigo
- Frank McGlynn, Sr. as Rev. Amos Bayley
- Jessie Stevens as Mammy
- Charles Sutton as Colonel Randolph
- John Walker as William, the adopted boy

== Plot ==
On her sixth birthday, Joy Randolph is carried off by a band of gypsies, after having been given by her grandfather. Colonel Randolph, a locket containing her mother's portrait. The child's hat is found in the river, where the gypsies have thrown it. This leads to the belief that she has been drowned. The shock to the Colonel is so great that he is taken very ill, and the doctor tells the Rev. Amos Bayley that he fears the Colonel will go insane unless someone is found to replace Joy in her grandfather's heart. The minister procures a young boy from the neighboring orphan's home, and Colonel Randolph finally takes the child to his heart and tells him that he will be a father to him.

Twelve years elapse, and the gypsies, confident that Joy will no longer be recognized, return to the village from whence they stole her. Joy is known among the Romany people as Romono, and is now eighteen. Franko, second in command of the band, is in love with her. but Rigo, the chief of the gypsies, prevents him from forcing his attentions upon her. William, the Colonel's adopted son, has just returned from the University of Virginia, and he and Joy meet. It is a case of love at first sight, and William begs his foster-father's permission to marry the girl. The Colonel Is furious over the Idea, little dreaming who the seeming gypsy really Is, He has seized the gypsies' horses for trampling his crops, but in the meantime Romono has left the hand and gone to live with the minister, where she finds the old colored mammy, who was once her nurse, though, of course, she does not recognize her. The Colonel bargains with Rigo, the chief of the band, to restore the horses to them if they will get away immediately and take Romono with them. Meantime, William and Romono slip away to the office of the Justice of the Peace and are married. William is captured by the gypsies, and Franko goes to the minister's house with a note for Romono from Rigo, telling her that unless she gives Franko the money which the minister baa collected towards the building of a new church, he will Are his rifle as a signal for her husband's death. Thus threatened, Romono hands over the church funds.

Franko returns to the camp dragging Romono with him, but in the meantime the gypsies have taken William to a nearby saw mill and bound him to a huge log, Rigo setting the saw in motion. Telling Romono that she will find her lover In pieces at the mill, Rigo and Franko start to follow the gypsy band away, but Franko, Incensed at Rlgo's having allowed Romono to go, attacks him with a knife. In the struggle, both are mortally wounded, and drop side by side. Here they are found by the minister, who bears Rlgo's dying confession regarding the kidnapping of Romono. or Joy, years before, and the stealing of the church funds. Meantime, Romono has reached the mill, and Just In the nick of time, throws the lever and stops the saw, saving her husband's life. Back at the minister's house, Colonel Randolph, after the minister's explanation, realizes that his adopted son has, unknowingly, married his long-lost granddaughter, and belated happiness Is brought to all as a result of William's falling in love with "The Girl of the Gypsy Camp."
