= For the Cause of the South =

1912 film

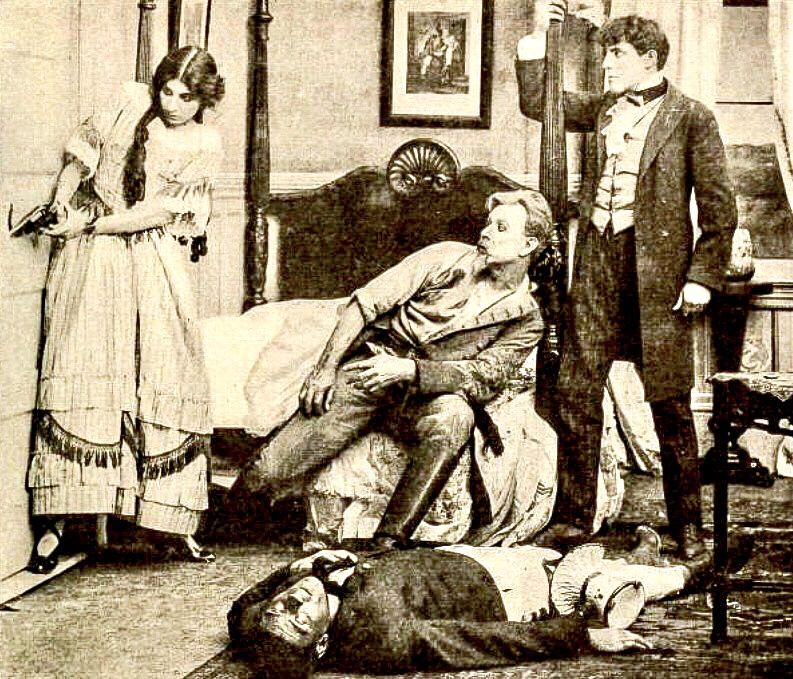
- Film still of Helen (Laura Sawyer) defending her wounded father (Charles Ogle, seated)
- Directed by: Bannister Merwin
- Written by: Bannister Merwin; Henry Albert Phillips
- Produced by: Thomas A. Edison, Inc.
- Starring: Laura Sawyer; Benjamin Wilson; Charles Stanton Ogle
- Production companies: Edison Studios; The Bronx, New York
- Distributed by: The General Film Company
- Release date: January 26, 1912
- Running time: 1000 feet (approximately 15 minutes)
- Country: United States
- Language: Silent (English intertitles)

For the Cause of the South is a lost 1912 American silent film that portrayed a tragic, fictional romance set during the American Civil War. Directed by Bannister Merwin, the film was produced by Edison Studios, which was located in New York City, in The Bronx. The production starred Laura Sawyer, Benjamin Wilson, and Charles Ogle, with supporting characters played by Bessie Learn and James Gordon in the role of Confederate General Robert E. Lee.

== Plot ==
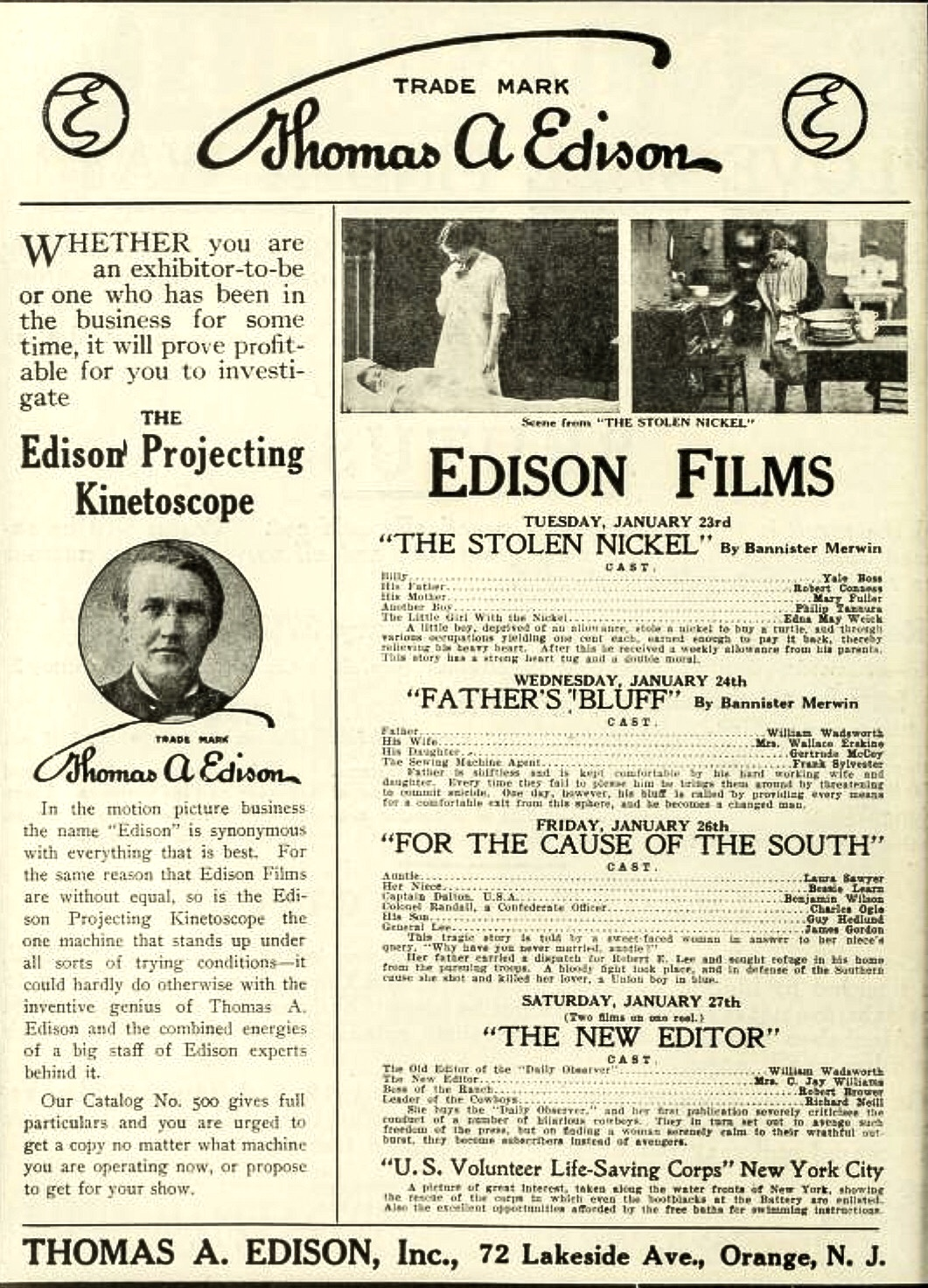
Release announcement

According to articles and reviews in 1912 trade publications, the film began with scenes set in the contemporary Southern United States, over 50 years after the start of the American Civil War. Helen Randall, an elderly well-to-do Southern spinster, is described sitting at her home and conversing with her niece Edith, a young woman who is engaged and soon to be married. Curious about her aunt's past, Edith asks her why she never married. Helen is visibly disheartened by the question but shows her niece a photograph of a young soldier, a keepsake she displays on the fireplace mantle in her living room. The scene then transitioned back in time to just before the war, when Helen is a teenager and is attending a women's seminary located near West Point, New York. While a student there she meets and falls in love with Charles Dalton, a cadet at the United States Military Academy. The couple's plans to marry are soon interrupted by the outbreak of war between the North and South. Helen, obeying her father, returns home while Charles remains in New York, where he is commissioned as a captain of a cavalry unit in the Union army. Meanwhile, Helen's father joins the opposing Confederate States Army to serve as a colonel.

As the war intensifies and drags on, Helen loses touch with Charles. Her father, who is now away from their home serving at the front, is ordered by General Robert E. Lee to deliver an urgent, secret message to General "Stonewall" Jackson, information that may prevent the fall of Richmond, Virginia, the Confederacy's capital, to Union forces. While skirting "Yankee" lines, Colonel Randall is seen by Union soldiers, who chase him. The desperate colonel's home happens to be nearby, so Randall rushes there with the enemy in hot pursuit. Helen and her older brother Harry are at the stately residence and are startled when their father appears. Frantic to protect him, she, unlike her cowardly brother, helps to defend him and to safeguard the message he is carrying when a unit of Union cavalry arrives. Helen during the "bloody fight" that ensues is shocked to see that her beloved Charles is leading the unit. Armed with a pistol, she ultimately has to choose between her loyalty to family and the Confederacy or her love for Charles. Loyalty prevails, and she shoots and kills Charles. She then faints amid the chaos, but upon awakening she finds that Confederate soldiers had arrived to chase off the remaining Yankee troopers. Although she is hailed as a Southern heroine, Helen grieves and remains devastated by the death of the man she once planned to wed, a casualty of war that she inflicted. She therefore dedicates her own remaining years to living a chaste, unmarried life.

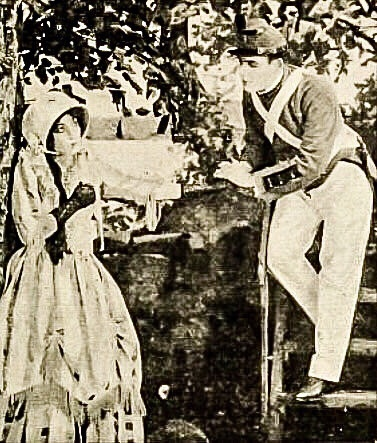
Helen and her sweetheart Charles meet before the war.

== Cast ==
- Laura Sawyer as Helen Randall, the Colonel's daughter
- Bessie Learn as Edith, Helen's niece
- Benjamin Wilson as Union Captain Charles Dalton
- Charles Ogle as Confederate Colonel Randall
- Guy Hedlund as Harry Randall, the Colonel's son and Helen's brother
- James Gordon as Confederate General Robert E. Lee

== Production and release ==
The sets for staging the production were built in New York City at the main filming facilities of Edison Studios, which were located at the intersection of Decatur Avenue and Oliver Place in the Bronx. Many of the needed extras who performed as low-ranking Union and Confederate soldiers and as other peripheral characters in the story were residents hired from the Bronx neighborhoods surrounding the studio. At that time it was common practice for Edison to gather and hire people living and working nearby, to "pick up drivers, cartmen, anyone as an extra".

The 1000-foot "one-reeler" was released on January 26, 1912 and distributed by the General Film Company. The lack of published reviews of the picture in major newspapers in the United States in 1912 suggests that the film had a limited distribution. It was, however, advertised at the time in some trade journals. In those publications Edison promoted it as a tragic tale of "a sweet-faced woman", who in her defense of the Southern cause "shot and killed her lover, a Union boy in blue."

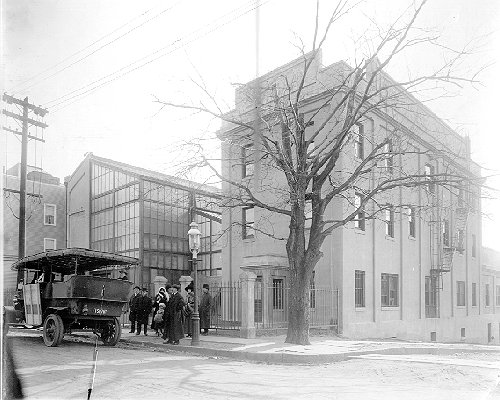
Part of Edison's main studio in the Bronx from 1907 to 1918

== "Lost" film status ==
No copy of this Edison production is listed in Library of Congress, the UCLA Film Archives, in the collection of moving images at the Museum of Modern Art, the George Eastman Museum, the Library and Archives Canada, or in other major film repositories in the United States, Canada, or Europe. The film is therefore presumed to be a lost production. A major fire at Edison's Bronx facilities on March 28, 1914 devastated much of the studio, destroying sets, large collections of costumes, production equipment, and, as reported in The New York Times, "many moving picture feature films". It is quite possible that any master negatives and prints of For the Cause of the South stored there were among the losses in that fire.
