= Bessie Learn =

American actress

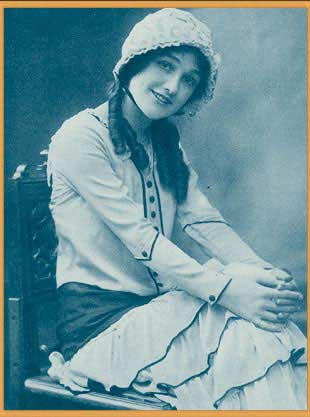
- Born: August 30, 1888; San Diego, California, US
- Died: February 5, 1987 (aged 98); Burbank, Los Angeles, California, US
- Occupation: Actress
- Years active: 1911–1919 (film)

Bessie Learn (30 August 1888 – 5 February 1987) was an American actress who appeared in 86 films between 1911 and 1919.

== Biography ==
Elizabeth “Bessie” Learn was born in San Diego the middle of three daughters raised by Eugene and Lizzie Learn. Her father was a native of New York who served in the U.S. Army before marrying Lizzie MacBride on October 11, 1883, in Buffalo County, Nebraska. Eugene Learn was a house painter by trade and by the time of the birth of his first daughter he and Lizzie were living in California. Soon after Bessie's birth her family relocated to Chicago where her father found work as a printer. A few years later Bessie's mother died in Chicago leaving her father to care for three young daughters.

Bessie Learn's first known stage appearance came at age eight with Amelia Bingham, in Hearts are Trumps; playing a baby in a stroller. She later played in The Little Princess, with Millie James, Lover's Lane on Broadway, with Mary Ryan and had a two-year run with Edwin Arden in Home Folks. She next appeared with Harry Brodribb Irving in Paola and Francesca and Midsummer Night's Dream and in vaudeville with Robert Hilliard and William Harcourt as the boy, and in the stage play Polly of the Circus.

She became the ingenue of the Edison Company at the age of 22, and in her short time before the camera made an enviable record for vivacious and appealing comedy. Little Miss Learn was featured in some of the best comedies Edison released, and was considered a serious player with marked ability. Her death was recorded on February 5, 1987, in Los Angeles under the name Betty Robbins, aged 98.

== Selected filmography ==
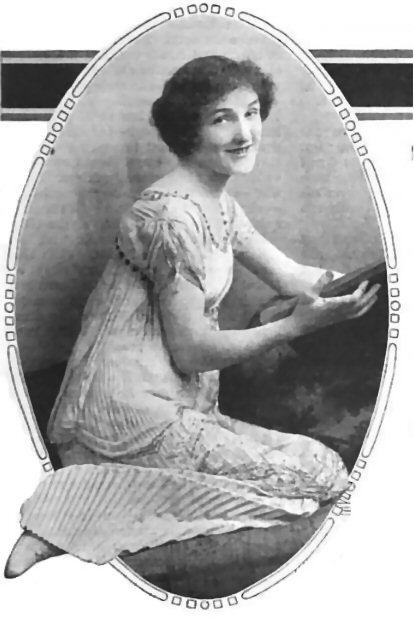
Fan magazine Photoplay, December 1915

- For the Cause of the South (1912)
- On The Broad Stairway (1913)
- The Girl of the Gypsy Camp (1915)
- The Lost Battalion (1919)
