= Laura Sawyer =

American actress

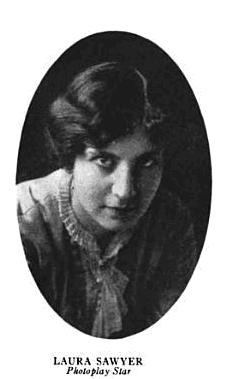
- The Theater of Science, 1913
- Born: February 3, 1885; Iron County, Missouri, US
- Died: September 7, 1970 (aged 85); Matawan, New Jersey, US
- Occupation: Silent film actress
- Years active: 1908–1915
- Spouse: Charles Frederick Wolff

Laura Sawyer (February 3, 1885 – September 7, 1970) was an American film actress on stage and in silent films.

== Early life ==
Sawyer was born in Iron County, Missouri, the daughter of Alvah Hayden and Laurette Sawyer. Her father was a doctor. By 1900 she was a boarder at the Ursuline Academy in St. Louis.

== Career ==
Sawyer began her career on stage with the Otis Skinner theatrical company and performed in Shakespeare's plays for two years. She also toured with E. H. Sothern. She joined the Edison Studios while still in her early twenties. She almost immediately found stardom at Edison and remained with the studio until 1913. Her most memorable performance during the period was probably playing the title role in The Lighthouse Keeper's Daughter (1912). Over her tenure with his film studio Thomas Edison was said to have considered Sawyer as his favorite actress. She later joined the Famous Players Film Company where she played Kate Kirby in the detective films Chelsea 7750, An Hour Before Dawn and The Port of Doom, all released in 1913, and was praised for her performance in The Daughter of the Hills, also produced in 1913. In 1914, she starred with Betty Harte in A Woman's Triumph where they played roles as sisters of widely different temperament. Sawyer’s last known film appearance was in The Daughter of the People, produced by the Dyreda Art Film Corporation in 1915.

== Personal life and death ==
Sawyer disappeared from the public eye until her death in 1970. At some point she married Charles Frederick Wolff and spent time living in Florida and New Jersey. Her daughter Hayden grew up in Manhattan, New York, and Bronxville, New York. She died on September 7, 1970, in Emory Manor Nursing Home in Matawan, New Jersey, aged 85.

== Selected filmography ==
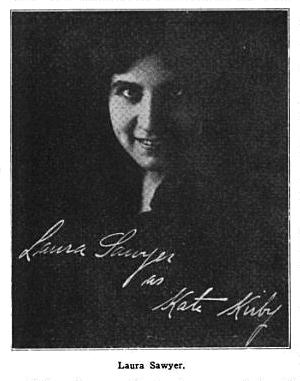
The Moving Picture World, 1913

- The Rajah (1911)
- The Battle of Trafalgar (1911)
- The Lighthouse by the Sea (1911)
- For the Cause of the South (1912)
- For Valour (1912)
- In His Father's Steps (1912)
- Hulda of Holland (1913)
- The Twelfth Juror (1913)
- The Old Monk's Tale (1913)
- On The Broad Stairway (1913)
- Chelsea 7750 (1913)
- An Hour Before Dawn (1913)
- The Port of Doom (1913)
- The Daughter of the Hills (1913)
- A Woman's Triumph (1914)
- The Valentine Girl (1917) (*as writer)
