= James Gordon (actor) =

American actor (1871–1941)

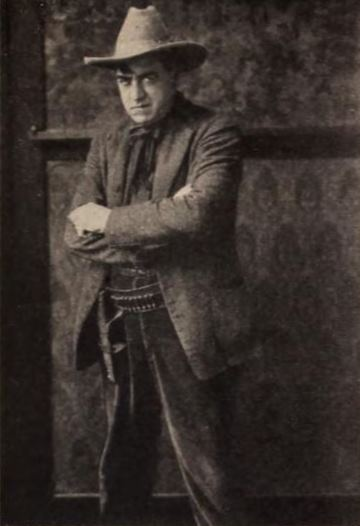
- Gordon in Sunset Jones (1921)
- Born: April 23, 1871; Pittsburgh, Pennsylvania, US
- Died: May 12, 1941 (aged 70); Hollywood, California, US
- Years active: 1911-1935
- Spouse: Mabel Van Buren

James Gordon (April 23, 1871 – May 12, 1941) was an American silent film actor. He appeared in more than 120 films between 1911 and 1935. He also directed 4 films between 1913 and 1915, including the 1915 film The New Adventures of J. Rufus Wallingford.

Gordon was born in Pittsburgh, Pennsylvania, on April 23, 1871. He died on May 12, 1941, in Hollywood, California, aged 70, from post-surgical complications. He is buried in Hollywood Forever Cemetery.

== Selected filmography ==
- The Battle of Trafalgar (1911)
- The Lighthouse by the Sea (1911)
- For the Cause of the South (1912)
- The Charge of the Light Brigade (1912)
- The Librarian (1912, Short) as Corporal Cutler
- The Old Monk's Tale (1913)
- Tess of the d'Urbervilles (1913)
- Caprice (1913)
- The Lure of the Circus (1918)
- The Final Close-Up (1919)
- When Doctors Disagree (1919)
- Behind the Door (1919)
- The Blue Moon (1920)
- Homespun Folks (1920)
- Excuse My Dust (1920)
- The Bait (1921)
- The Man from Lost River (1921)
- Sunset Jones (1921)
- Trailin' (1921)
- Nancy from Nowhere (1922)
- A Game Chicken (1922)
- On the High Seas (1922)
- Defying Destiny (1923)
- Man's Size (1923)
- The White Sin (1924)
- Wanderer of the Wasteland (1924)
- The Man Who Came Back (1924)
- Hearts of Oak (1924)
- Tumbleweeds (1925)
- Beauty and the Bad Man (1925)
- The Social Highwayman (1926)
- Miss Nobody (1926)
- The Ice Flood (1926)
- The Buckaroo Kid (1926)
- Rose of the Tenements (1926)
- Flying High (1926)
- Devil's Dice (1926)
- Tongues of Scandal (1927)
- Babe Comes Home (1927)
- Publicity Madness (1927)
- The War Horse (1927)
- The Cancelled Debt (1927)
- Wolf Fangs (1927)
- The Charge of the Gauchos (1928)
- Masked Emotions (1929)
- Neighbors' Wives (1933)
