= Battle of Pottsburg Bridge =

1912 film by Kalem Company

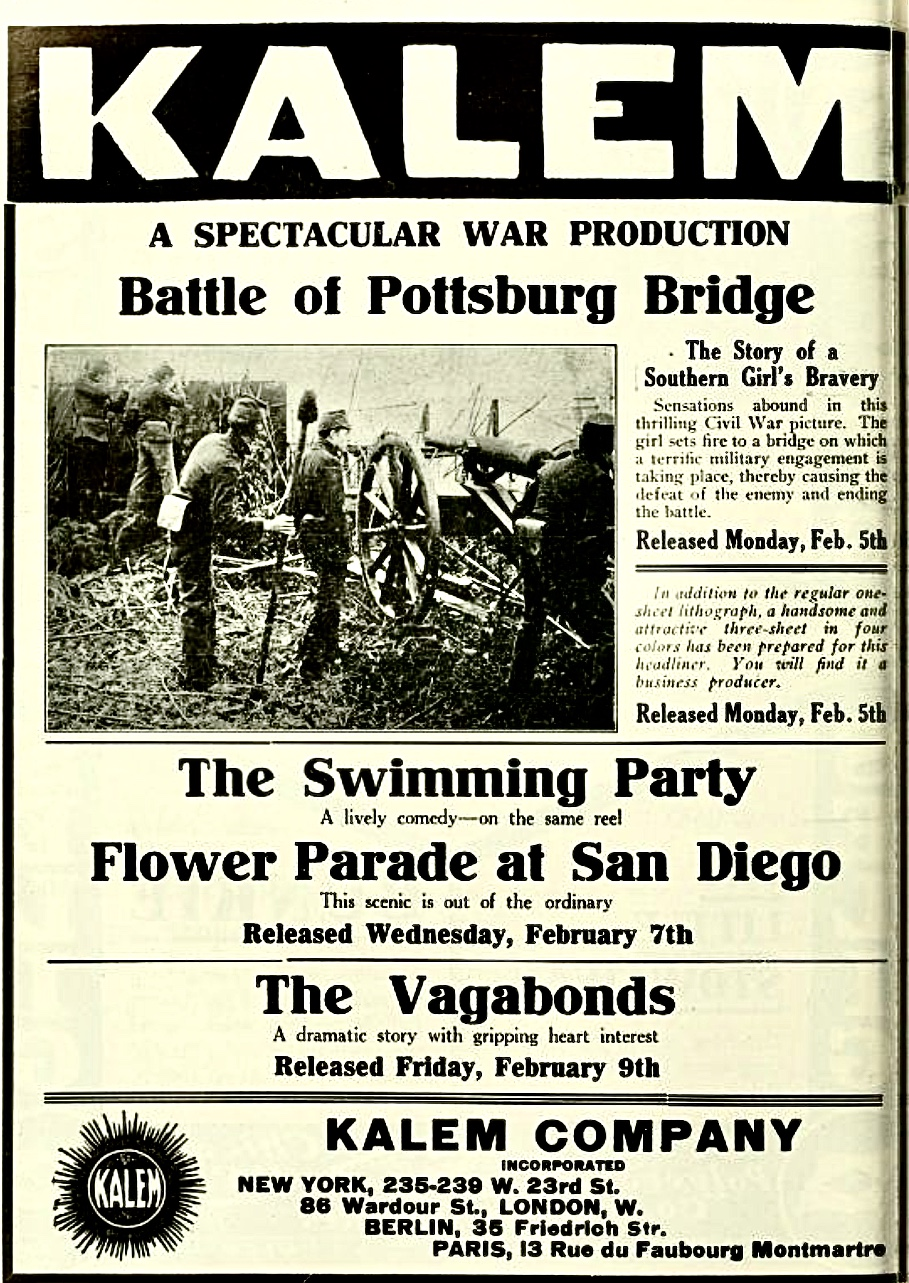
- Advertisement in The Moving Picture World, January 1912
- Directed by: Kenean Buel; Storm Boyd (assistant director)
- Produced by: Kalem Company; New York City
- Starring: Guy Coombs; Anna Q. Nilsson; Miriam Cooper
- Cinematography: Undetermined
- Distributed by: General Film Company, Inc., New York, N.Y.
- Release date: February 5, 1912
- Running time: 15 minutes, 35mm 1 reel (1000 feet) (Note: According to the reference How Movies Work by Bruce F. Kawin (New York: Macmillan Publishing Company, 1987, pp. 46-47), a full 1000-foot reel of film in the silent era had a maximum running time between 15 and 16 minutes. Silent films were generally projected at an average or "standard" speed of 16 frames per second, much slower than the 24 frames of later sound films.)
- Country: United States
- Languages: Silent film English intertitles

Battle of Pottsburg Bridge is a lost 1912 silent motion picture set during the American Civil War. Released in February that year by the Kalem Company of New York City, the drama was filmed in northeastern Florida at the company's "winter studio", which was located on the outskirts of Jacksonville. It starred Guy Coombs, Anna Q. Nilsson, and Miriam Cooper.

No footage of this "photoplay" is listed among the holdings of major film repositories, studio archives, or in known private collections in North America or Europe. This Kalem release is therefore presumed to be lost. A small number of production stills used as illustrations in promotions of the film survive in 1912 trade publications.

== Plot ==
A plot summary of this Civil War drama is provided in the January 27, 1912 issue of the New York trade publication The Moving Picture World:

According to the story of the picture, the bridge at Pottsburg Creek is held by the Federal (Note: In references about the American Civil War, land and naval forces fighting on behalf of the United States against the Confederate States of America are generally referred to as either "Federal" or "Union" forces. In 1912 trade publications, those terms were used interchangeably, although "Federal" was used almost exclusively by Kalem in its promotions of its Civil War films and in descriptions of the plots in those productions.) troops who are attacked by a detachment from General Stuart's brigade. The bridge is near the home of a young Confederate soldier [Bartlow] and, because of his knowledge of the country, he is detailed to burn it and thus destroy the Federal communications. Discovered in his attempt the Confederate soldier is severely wounded, and when he drifts to the landing, he is rescued by his mother, sister and sweetheart, who have been watching his efforts.The sister [Jessie] then takes up the task and manages to escape the sentries and sets the bridge on fire. At the time she succeeds the opposing forces are fighting on the bridge. The Confederates blow up one end of the structure while the girl sets fire to the other end, trapping the Federals between and compelling them to jump into the water and swim out when they are captured.The girl drops into the water after setting the fire and makes a long swim to safety. When General Stuart visits the home of the wounded soldier to congratulate him upon the success of his venture, he learns of the bravery of the sister. This part is played by Marion [sic] Cooper, a new Kalem beauty, who proves herself to be some swimmer. There is much good action in this picture.

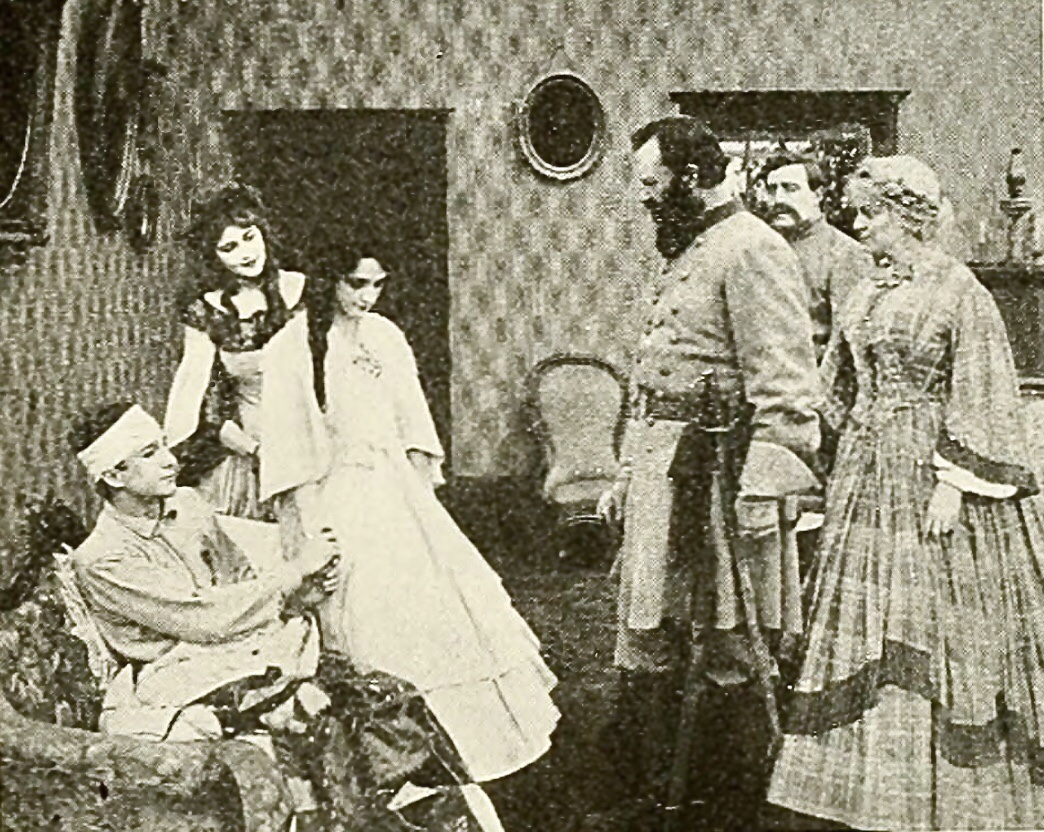
Film still of the principal cast: (from left) Guy Coombs, Anna Q. Nilsson, Miriam Cooper holding Coombs' hands, Henry Hallum as General Stuart, Hal Clements, and Helen Lindroth

== Cast ==
- Guy Coombs as Bartlow
- Anna Q. Nilsson as Bartlow's "sweetheart"
- Miriam Cooper as Bartlow's sister Jessie
- Henry Hallam as Confederate General J. E. B. Stuart
- Hal Clements as a Confederate officer
- Helen Lindroth as Bartlow and Jessie’s mother
- George B. Hoyt as a Federal soldier
- Extras hired from the Jacksonville area to perform as Confederate and Federal soldiers in "spectacular battle scenes"

== Production ==
This film was part of a series of films that Kalem released in the United States between 1911 and 1915 to mark the 50th anniversary of the Civil War. In 1912 alone Kalem produced and Kenean Buel directed at least a dozen additional dramas set during that conflict: The Bugler of Battery B, The Siege of Petersburg, A Spartan Mother, The Tide of Battle, The Darling of the C.S.A., War's Havoc, 'Fighting Dan' McCool, Under a Flag of Truce, The Soldier Brothers of Susanna, Saved From Court Martial, The Drummer Girl of Vicksburg, and The Confederate Ironclad. (Note: The cited titles of Kalem's Civil War films were compiled from the 1912 issues of the company's Kalem Kalendar, copies of which are available on the Internet Archive.)

Although Kalem in 1912 was headquartered in New York City on West 24th Street in Manhattan, the company in its Civil War films routinely presented Southern civilians and soldiers as daring, sympathetic heroes fighting against and defeating their Northern foes, recurring themes that later prompted actress Miriam Cooper to write in her 1973 memoir Dark Lady of the Silents, "In picture after picture we won the war for the Confederates fifty years after the war was over."

=== Filming in Florida ===
All of Kalem's previously noted Civil War dramas, as well as Battle of Pottsburg Bridge, were filmed in northeastern Florida at the company's "winter studio", which was located next to the St. Johns River "about fifteen minutes by trolley" from downtown Jacksonville. There, since the autumn of 1908, Kalem had leased spaces in an old three-story hotel to serve as the company's production headquarters in Florida. The hotel, "Roseland", was situated on three acres that also accommodated a large home, several cabins, and other outbuildings. Nearby, at the river, were a "big wharf" and "boats of all kinds", some of which served as props in screenplays and others to transport Director Buel, his camera operators, principal cast members, and any locally hired extras around the "territory rich in locations" for filming. Among other motion picture props assembled and stored on the Roseland properties for staging the Battle of Pottsburg Bridge and other war-related productions were supplies of Confederate and Federal uniforms, assorted military accoutrements, and various weapons, including several 1860s field cannons with their caissons for hauling ammunition. (Note: See Wikipedia Commons' photograph "File:Roseland Hotel 1908.jpg", which shows pieces of Civil War artillery equipment stored on the grounds of Kalem's Florida studio.)

=== Cinematographer ===
The cinematographer for this drama is undetermined, although production schedules and news reports suggest it might have been George K. Hollister. In Kalem's December 15, 1911 issue of the Kalem Kalendar, the company reports that "camera operator" Hollister had transferred weeks earlier from New York to Jacksonville "for the winter" after he returned from filming in Ireland during the summer of 1911. The cinematographer by then had worked for Kalem for three years, had helped to establish studio operations in Florida, and had shot numerous photoplays there and in other domestic locations as well as overseas. Accompanying Hollister to Jacksonville in the fall of 1911 were his wife Alice and their two small children. Alice Hollister at the time was already a screen celebrity, having starred or costarred in Kalem projects filmed in New York, in earlier productions shot in Florida, and in Ireland with her husband. Later that same year, in Jacksonville, she costarred in the Civil War drama Driving Home the Cows, which was filmed by George Hollister under the direction of Sidney Olcott. That completed production would not be released to theaters until New Year's Day 1912, just a month before the initial distribution of Battle of Pottsburg Bridge.

The Hollisters' overseas travel schedule after the completion of Driving Home the Cows documents that the family and Director Olcott did not remain in Jacksonville for the winter season. By late November 1911, all of them had returned to New York City to rejoin the "'Kalem Globetrotters'", a special company of actors and crew who on December 2 departed aboard the S.S. Adriatic to travel to filming locations in southern Europe, Egypt, and Palestine. George therefore did not film Battle of Pottsburg Bridge; instead, it was shot by another Kalem cinematographer under Kenean Buel's direction.

=== Nilsson and Cooper ===
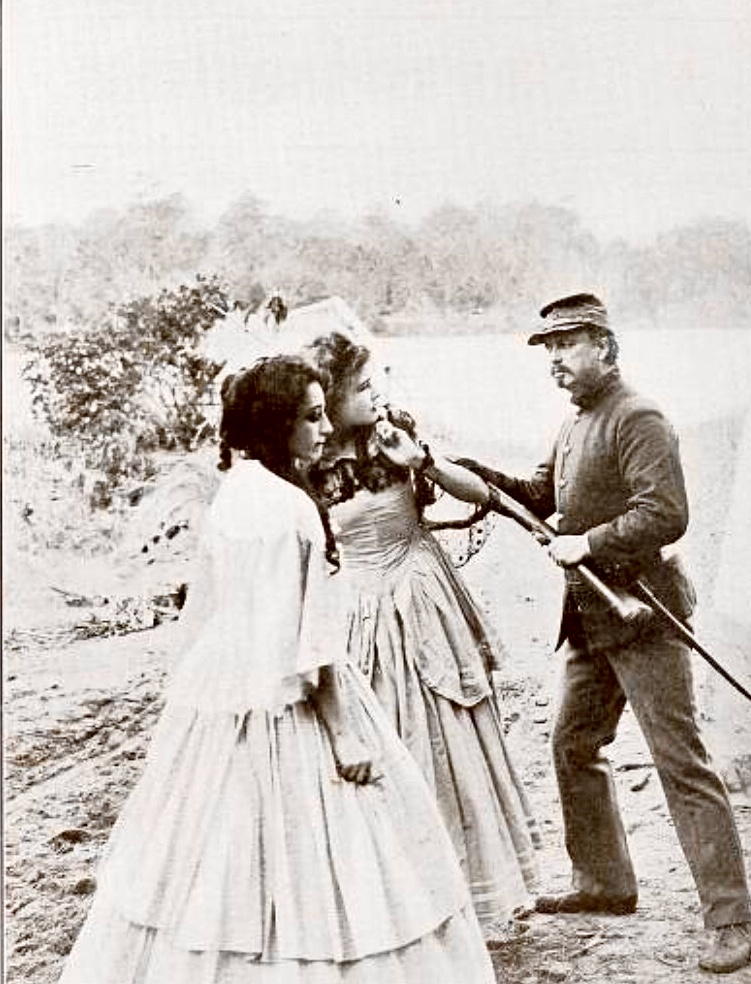
Another still showing (from left) actresses Cooper and Nilsson confronted by George B. Hoyt in costume as a Federal soldier

While 23-year-old Anna Q. Nilsson was recognized as the lead actress in Kalem's Jacksonville company in 1912, it was actress Miriam Cooper who received far more screen time than Nilsson and who was viewed in news outlets as being the "favorite" in Kalem's Civil War dramas. Cooper, in the role of Bartlow's sister Jessie, served as this film's central action hero, performing all of her own stunts. Dressed in a "suit" of her brother's clothes, Jessie rowed out to the Pottsburg Bridge, set fire to the wooden structure, and swam to safety as Federal forces dove into the river to escape the ensuing blaze. Nilsson, on the other hand, served in a more passive, peripheral role as Guy Coombs' love interest in a romantic side story. In early 1912, the Swedish actress was already an experienced screen performer. Cooper, though, was a newcomer to Kalem's Jacksonville company of players, and for her work on this release and others, the 20-year-old actress earned a salary of "thirty-five dollars a week and expenses", which included her accommodations in Florida. (Note: This production, like most other Kalem one-reelers in this period, was filmed in one week or less. The inclusive dates as to when this drama was actually shot remain uncertain. Post-production work was generally accomplished very quickly for films of this length in the early silent era. Nevertheless, even allowing for the rapid shipment of the film's master negatives by train from Florida to Kalem's headquarters in New York, for time to review that footage and create a final cut with intertitles, to produce numerous theatrical prints, and allow reasonable time for the General Film Company in New York to market and distribute the picture by its February 5, 1912 release date would require several weeks. Given that timeframe, the drama's filming was likely done sometime in December 1911. See pages 24-27 in Miriam Cooper's memoir Dark Lady of the Silents; My Life in Early Hollywood, a work cited in greater detail on this page under "References".)

=== A "serious" mishap while filming ===
While transporting some cast and crew by boat to film several scenes, Director Buel later reported to Kalem's home office in New York about "'an exciting experience'" that he and his players had near Pottsburg Creek as they traveled to their intended location:

"We were starting up the St. John's River and at the mouth of Pottsburg Creek there were several rafts of logs moored. As we were passing the last raft, steering carefully, as we were out of the regular channel, our boat struck a sunken pile and immediately began to fill with water. Fortunately we were carrying a small[er] boat for use in a scene and into this we transferred Miss Nilsson, the only lady member of the company who was with us. We hailed another launch which happened to be passing, and at first they refused to approach because of our dangerous position, but we finally prevailed upon them that our plight was a serious one and they came to the rescue. [It] was lucky the launch happened to be passing, otherwise there is no telling what the result might have been."

=== Burning of "Pottsburg Bridge" ===
The climactic battle scene in the film depicted Miriam Cooper's character—the "southern girl" Jessie—trapping Federal troops on a bridge by setting it on fire. According to a news item in the Kalem Kalendar, Director Buel wanted to add a true "touch of realism" to his production, so prior to filming those sequences he obtained permission from local government officials in Duval County, Florida to actually burn down the old bridge outside Jacksonville, a bridge situated near Pottsburg Creek and described to be "half a mile in length". As part of Buel's request, Kalem agreed to pay the full cost for constructing a new structure. The filming of the old bridge's destruction provided, in the director's words, a "thrilling effect" on the screen, with highly dramatic scenes full of "smoke and flames". The motion picture company's home office in New York City later reported, "The fact that the Commissioners granted this favor, attests [to] Kalem's popularity in Jacksonville and the hearty co-operation of the authorities".

Alluding to the bridge scene in this production, Cooper in her memoir comments on her stunt work and how her on-screen identity as a Southern heroine and action performer grew with her repeated performances in Kalem's Civil War pictures:

In another one-reeler I rowed a boat out to set fire to the bridge and cut off the Yankees. Recently I read in The Moving Picture World of 1912 some of the synopses of Kalem films. They called me plucky, brave, intrepid and courageous. I ran trains, shot cannons, burned bridges, spied, all for the Confederates. I don't see how the Yankees won the war.

== Release, promotion, and distribution ==
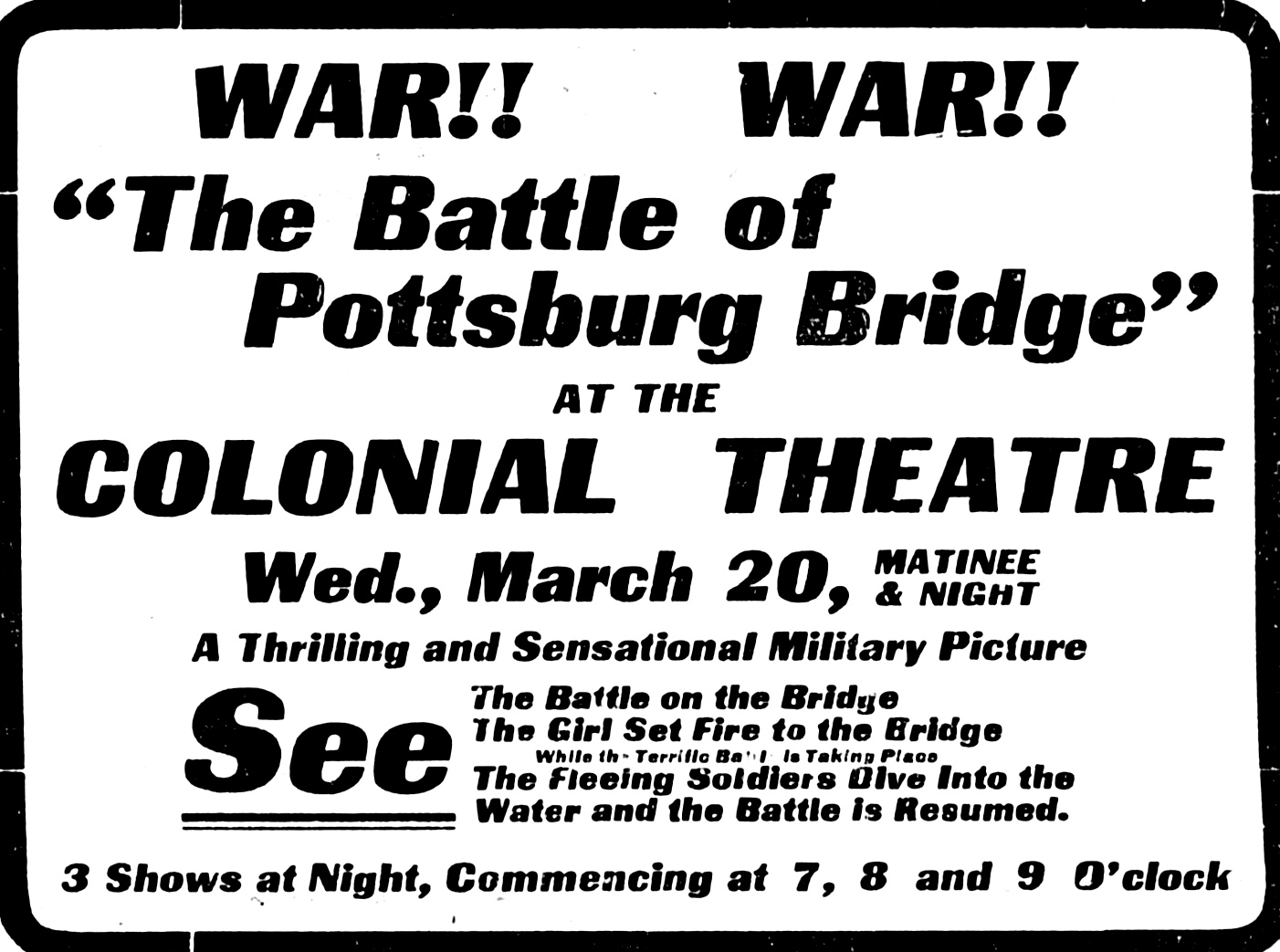
Newspaper promotion for the "Sensational Military Picture" in Keokuk, Iowa, March 1912

Kalem officially released the film in the United States on February 5, 1912 and widely promoted it. Examinations of available trade journals and newspapers from that period reveal few critical reviews about the overall quality of the film or many details about its content. The staff and audiences at the Picture Theatre in Los Angeles, California appear to have enjoyed the picture. In the March 2, 1912 issue of its Kalem Kalendar newsletter, Kalem quotes from correspondence it received from the owner of that establishment:

"We are now presenting at this house your release entitled The Battle of Pottsburg Bridge, and we desire to express the appreciation of our patrons and ourselves of this war drama. The details, action and photography are exceptionally good and we take pleasure in commending a photoplay of such excellent quality."

The preceding quoted reaction to this Kalem film published in a 1912 Kalem publication certainly could not be construed as wholly impartial. Perhaps a less biased review of the military drama is provided in the February 17, 1912 issue of The Moving Picture World. In a short assessment of the release under "Comments on the Films", the trade journal's reviewer also compliments the quality of the film's camerawork but judges the screen depiction of the battle itself decidedly lacking in credibility:

"THE BATTLE OF POTTSBURG BRIDGE" (Kalem), February 5.—A [war]-time picture showing a Southern heroine successfully firing the [timbers] of a bridge on which an interesting, but not very convincing skirmish between Jeb Stuart's cavalry and Union infantry is raging. It is a picture [that] will please the gallery a great deal. It is very well photographed for [the] most part.

=== Overseas market ===
The motion picture continued to circulate to domestic and foreign theaters for more than a year after its initial distribution. Only eight weeks after the photoplay's release in the United States, the "grand war drama" (grand drame de guerre) was already being promoted in France. In Paris, in the April 6, 1912 issue of the Ciné Journal, the M. P. Sales Agency announces to film exchanges and cinema owners that copies of La Bataille du pont de Pottsburg would soon be available. By mid-July 1912, the Empire Film Hire Service, a rental exchange in London, was offering to lease the drama and other "features" to cinemas throughout England and elsewhere in the United Kingdom. (Note: Later in the silent era and subsequent sound era in the American film industry, a "feature" was categorized as a film with a running time of at least 60 minutes. In the early silent era, within the period this drama was produced, most releases were one-reelers with maximum durations between 15 and 16 minutes. Despite their brief running times, in both advertising and in film commentaries those productions were often referred to as "features". Refer to Bruce F. Kawin's work How Movies Work, which is cited earlier and in more detail under this page's "Notes".)

=== Alice Hollister or Miriam Cooper? ===
In their promotions of the film, some news outlets and advertisers in 1912 credited and complimented another actress rather than Miriam Cooper as the action lead in the production. They erroneously cited in that role Alice Hollister, who, as noted, was the wife of Kalem cinematographer George Hollister and costarred in Driving Home the Cows, another Civil War drama shot in Jacksonville just prior to the filming of Battle of Pottsburg Bridge. One example of this misidentification can be found in the April 13, 1912 issue of the local newspaper in Logan, Utah. The Logan Republican in that issue provides its readers with its brief assessment of the screen drama after seeing it at the town's Oak Theatre: "'The Battle at Pottsburg Bridge' by the Kalem Company with Alice Hollister in the leading role, at the Oak[,] was a masterpiece of thrills, magnificently staged and played, showing how the brave southern girl saved the regiment by her daring...." That erroneous credit possibly stemmed from the newspaper's reviewer confusing this film with Driving Home the Cows, which costarred Hollister with Leo Berger and Gene Gauntier, and had been released only five weeks before Battle at Pottsburg Bridge.

More than a year after the release of the film, Miriam Cooper's performance was still being highlighted and praised in news references to the Battle of Pottsburg Bridge. In a professional profile of Cooper published in the District of Columbia, in the May 18, 1913 issue of The Washington Herald, the newspaper comments about her athletic prowess in performing all her own stunts:

If an actress has ever entered the motion picture branch of theatricals with a full equipment for that exacting and strenuous work, it is Miss Marian [sic] Cooper, of Kalem's Jacksonville (Fla.) Company. Miss Cooper is practically a newcomer in the Kalem ranks, but has already established herself as a favorite. Miss Cooper's most recent appearance was in the spectacular production "The Battle of Pottsburg Bridge." This thrilling drama would have been quite impossible without an actress of Miss Cooper's extraordinary ability to handle the difficult leading role, and the manner in which she dived, swam, handled the boat, and climbed the bridge is only a sample of what this athletic young woman can do. She is equally at home riding a spirited horse, and while she modestly refrains from issuing challenges, there are few who care to put on the boxing gloves with her.

== Lost film ==
Neither an original positive copy, negatives, nor partial footage from the Battle of Pottsburg Bridge is listed among the holdings of major film repositories and silent-film databases in North America and Europe, including the Library of Congress, the George Eastman Museum, the Museum of Modern Art's collection of moving images, the UCLA Film and Television Archives, the National Film Preservation Foundation, the Library and Archives Canada (LAC), the British Film Institute, Cinémathèque Française, the EYE Filmmuseum in Amsterdam, and other catalogs for silent motion pictures accessible through the European Film Gateway (EFG). Currently, this film, like the vast majority of motion pictures produced in the United States during the silent era, is presumed to be lost.
