= The Luck of the Irish (1920 film) =

1920 film by Allan Dwan

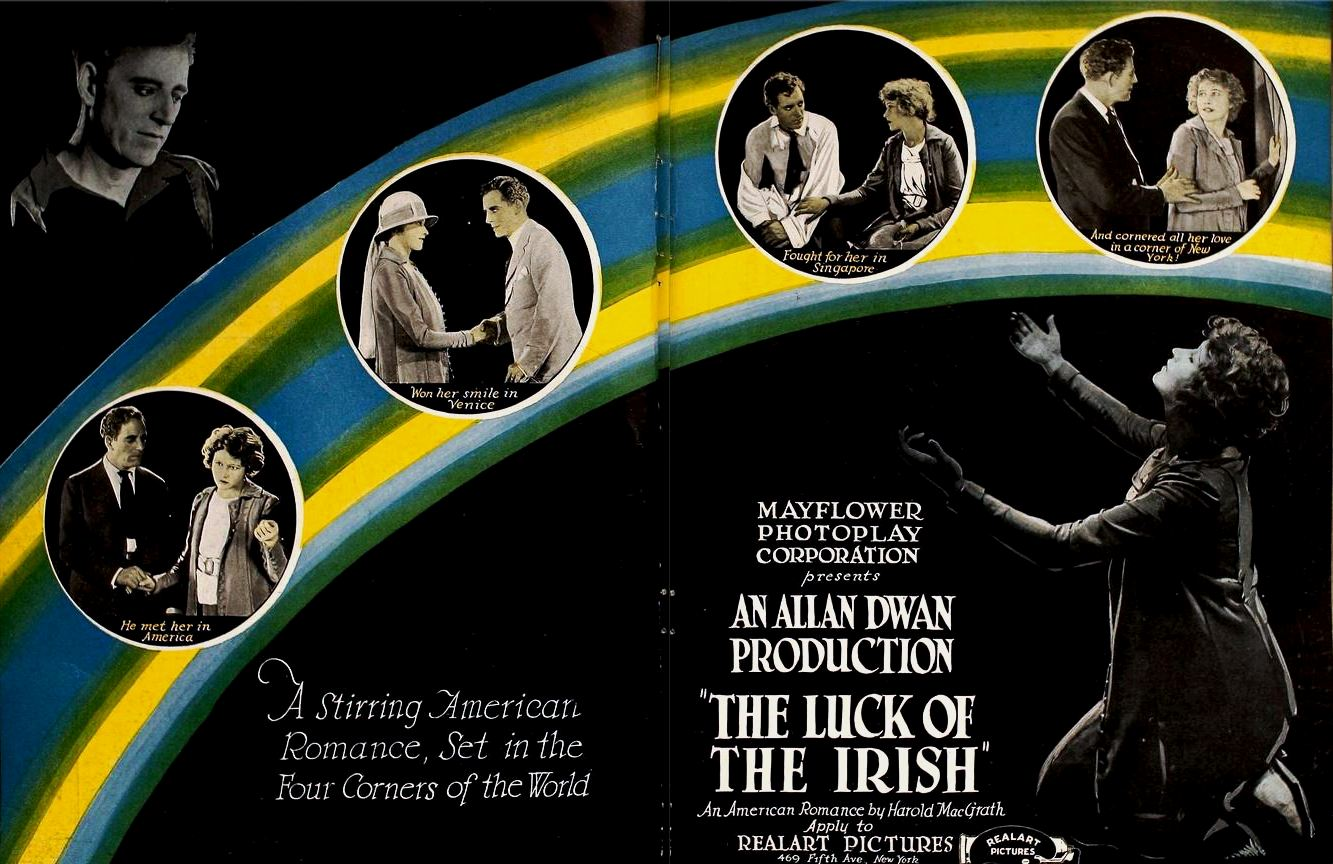
- Advertisement
- Directed by: Allan Dwan
- Based on: The Luck of the Irish by Harold MacGrath
- Produced by: Allan Dwan
- Starring: James Kirkwood Sr. Anna Q. Nilsson; Harry Northrup; Ward Crane; Ernest Butterworth Jr. Gertrude Messinger
- Cinematography: H. Lyman Broening; Glen MacWilliams
- Production companies: Allan Dwan Productions; Mayflower Photoplay Company
- Distributed by: Realart Pictures Corporation
- Release date: January 5, 1920
- Running time: 70 minutes
- Country: United States
- Language: Silent (English intertitles)

The Luck of the Irish is a 1920 American silent drama film directed by Allan Dwan. It is based on the 1917 novel The Luck of the Irish by Harold MacGrath. The film stars James Kirkwood Sr., Anna Q. Nilsson, Harry Northrup, Ward Crane, Ernest Butterworth Jr., and Gertrude Messinger. The film was released on January 5, 1920, by Realart Pictures Corporation.

== Cast ==
- James Kirkwood Sr. as William Grogan
- Anna Q. Nilsson as Ruth Warren
- Harry Northrup as Richard Camden
- Ward Crane as Norton Colburton
- Ernest Butterworth Jr. as The Kid
- Gertrude Messinger as The Kid's Romance
- Rose Dione as The Malay Street Woman
- Louise Lester as The Landlady
- Buddy Messinger (uncredited)
- Claire Windsor as Extra (uncredited)
