= Wilton Taylor =

American actor

- Born: 1869
- Died: January 24, 1925 (aged 55–56)
- Occupations: Actor; silent screen actor

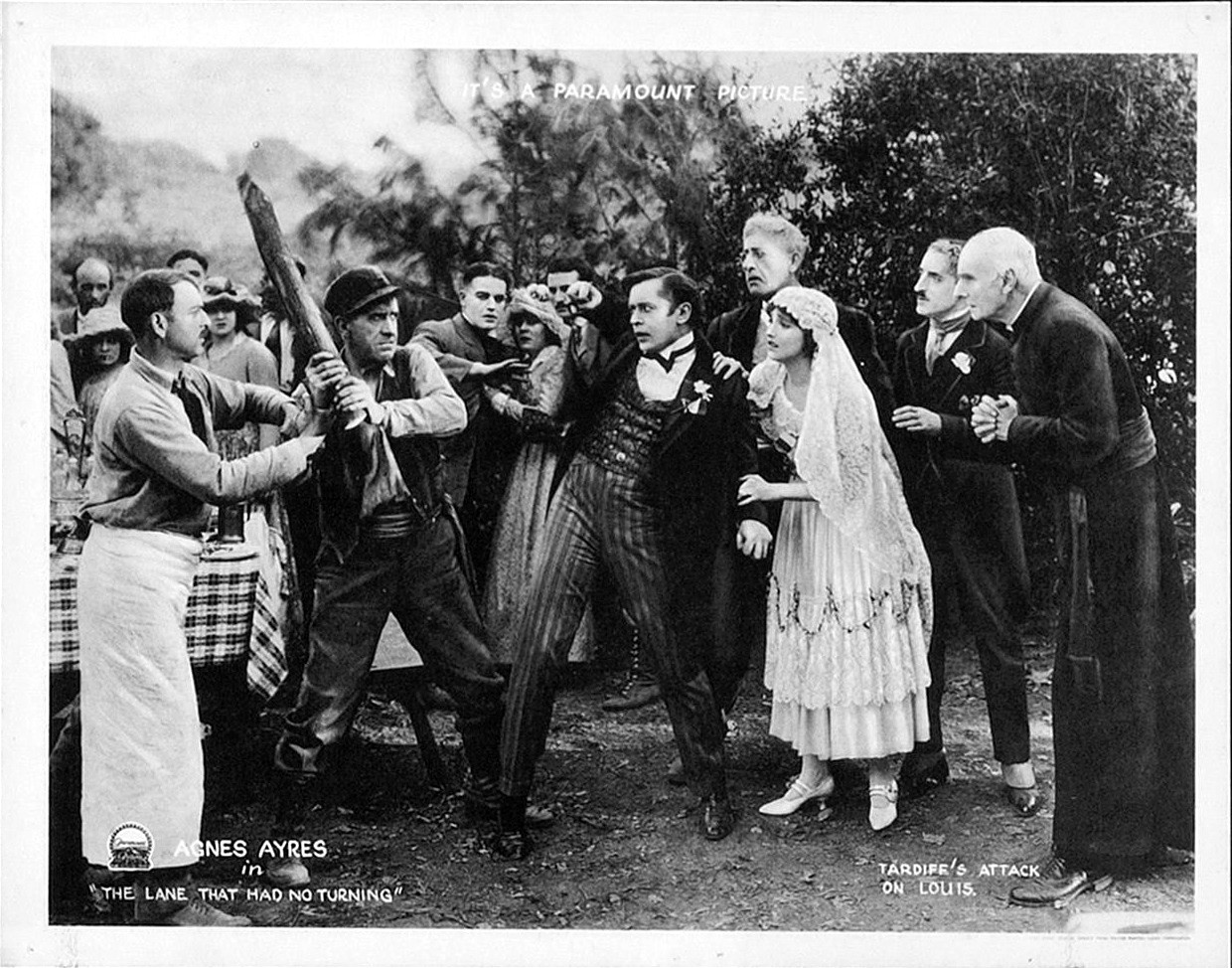
Wilton Taylor, sneer on face, behind Agnes Ayres center-right in The Lane That Had No Turning 1922.

Wilton Taylor (1869 – January 24, 1925) was an American male actor who performed on stage and in silent films. He usually played gruff men of authority like wardens, judges or the police commissioner in Tod Browning's Outside the Law (1920). Of some other surviving silent he can be seen in Houdini's Terror Island (1920). Prior to entering films he spent some years on the stage and appeared as a police inspector in the original 1912 Broadway production of Within the Law starring Jane Cowl. Taylor died in January 1925.

== Partial filmography ==
- The Gray Ghost (1917)
- Wild Women (1918)
- Peggy Does Her Darndest (1919)
- The Love Burglar (1919)
- Love Insurance (1919)
- The Lottery Man (1919)
- The Prince and Betty (1919)
- Blackie's Redemption (1919)
- Alias Jimmy Valentine (1920)
- Treasure Island (1920)
- Terror Island (1920)
- One Hour Before Dawn (1920)
- Outside the Law (1920)
- The Little Clown (1921)
- The Last Card (1921)
- Traveling Salesman (1921)
- Gasoline Gus (1921)
- The Spotted Lily (1917)
- The Cave Girl (1921)
- Sherlock Brown (1922)
- The Lane That Had No Turning (1922)
- Human Hearts (1922)
- Ridin' Wild (1922)
- The Drivin' Fool (1923)
- Madness of Youth (1923)
