= One Hour Before Dawn =

1920 film by Henry King

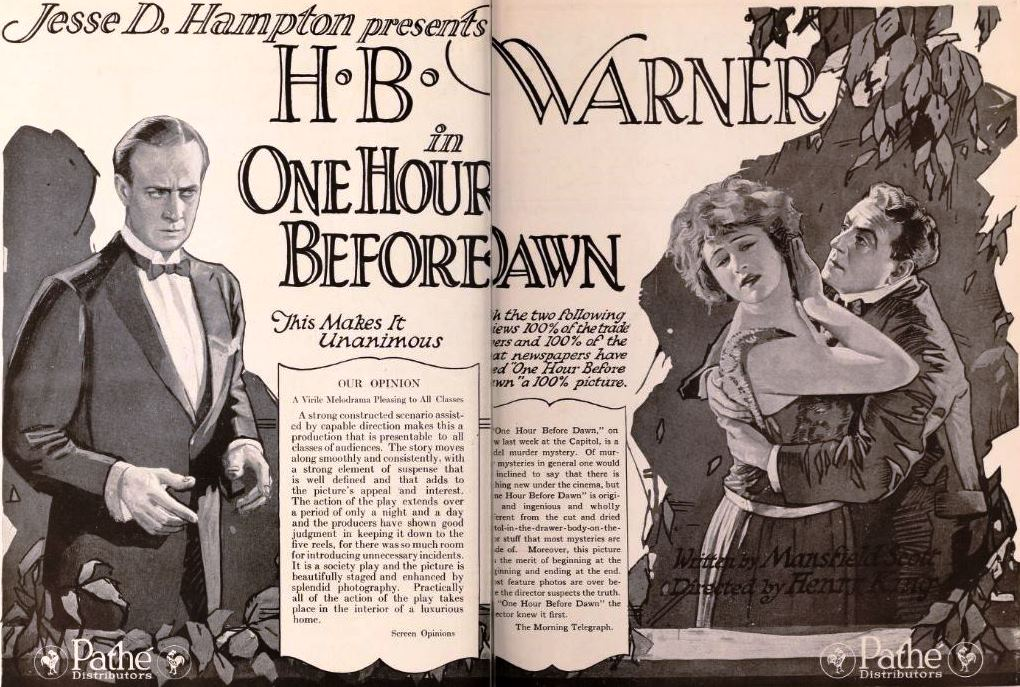
- period advertisement
- Directed by: Henry King
- Written by: Fred Myton
- Based on: Behind Red Curtains by Mansfield Scott
- Produced by: Jesse D. Hampton
- Starring: H. B. Warner; Anna Q. Nilsson
- Cinematography: Victor Milner
- Distributed by: Pathé Exchange
- Release date: July 11, 1920
- Running time: 53 minutes
- Country: USA

One Hour Before Dawn (aka Behind Red Curtains) is a 1920 silent film mystery directed by Henry King, written by Fred Myton and starring H. B. Warner, Frank Leigh and Anna Q. Nilsson. It was produced by Jesse D. Hampton and released by Pathé Exchange.

== Plot ==
When a hypnotist named Norman Osgood mesmerizes a man named Harrison Kirke without his consent, Kirke threatens to kill him. Afraid for his life, Osgood hypnotizes another man named George Clayton and tells him he must murder Mr. Kirke one hour before the arrival of the dawn. Kirke is found murdered the next day, and Clayton starts to believe he was the murderer. He is exonerated in the end, however, when the identity of the real murderer is discovered.

== Cast ==
- Frank Leigh - Norman Osgood
- Howard Davies - Harrison Kirke
- H. B. Warner - George Clayton
- Anna Q. Nilsson - Ellen Aldrich
- Augustus Phillips - Bob Manning
- Adele Farrington - Mrs. Montague
- Lillian Rich - Dorothy
- Dorothy Hagan - Mrs. Copeland
- Thomas Guise - Judge Copeland
- Ralph McCullough - Fred Aldrich
- Edmund Burns - Arthur
- Wilton Taylor - Inspector Steele

== Preservation status ==
- A print exists at Bois d'Arcy in France.
