= The Drummer Girl of Vicksburg =

1912 film by Kalem Company

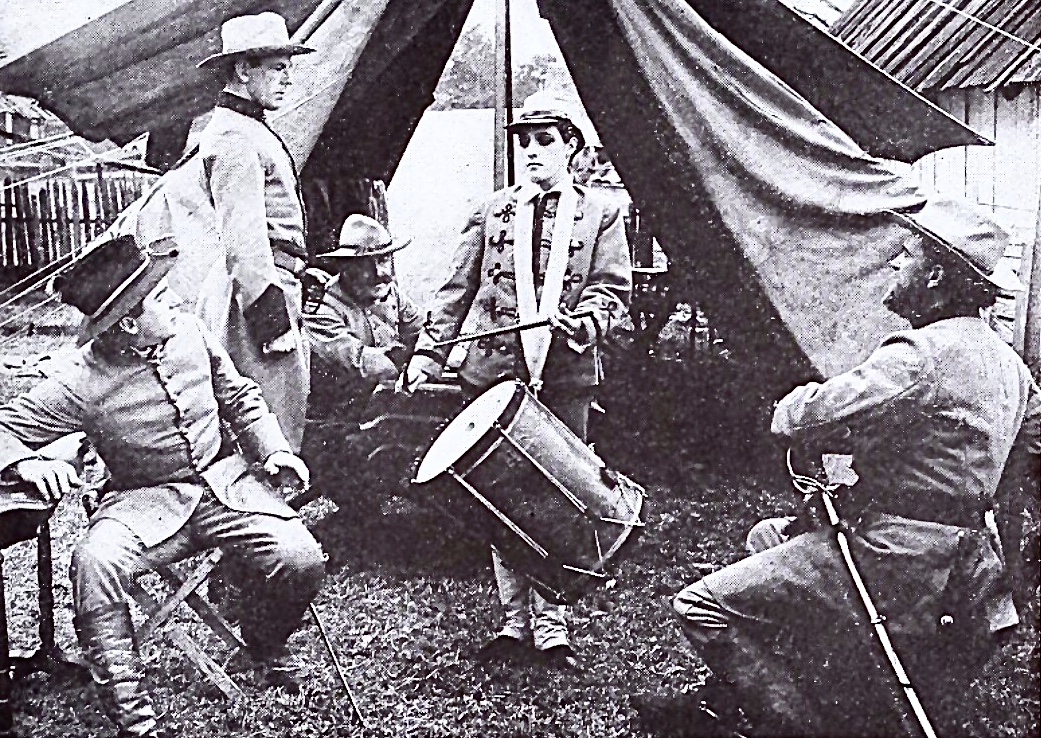
- Still of actress Miriam Cooper disguised as Confederate drummer "boy"
- Directed by: Kenean Buel; Storm Boyd (assistant director)
- Produced by: Kalem Company at its studio in Jacksonville, Florida
- Starring: Miriam Cooper; Guy Coombs; Anna Q. Nilsson; Hal Clements
- Music by: Walter C. Simon, composer of film's piano score for theaters
- Release date: June 5, 1912
- Running time: 15-16 minutes, 35mm 1 reel (1016 feet) (Note: According to the reference How Movies Work by Bruce F. Kawin (New York: Macmillan Publishing Company, 1987, pp. 46-47), a full 1000-foot reel of film in the silent era had a maximum running time of 15-16 minutes. Silent films were generally projected at an average or "standard" speed of 16 frames per second, much slower than the 24 frames of later sound films.)
- Country: United States
- Languages: Silent film English intertitles

The Drummer Girl of Vicksburg is a lost 1912 silent motion picture produced by Kalem Company of New York City and filmed in Jacksonville, Florida. With a storyline set in the 1860s, during the American Civil War, the military drama starred Miriam Cooper in the title role with a supporting cast that included Guy Coombs, Anna Q. Nilsson, and Hal Clements.

No footage of The Drummer Girl of Vicksburg is listed among the holdings of major film repositories, studio archives, or known private collections in North America, Europe, or elsewhere in the world. This Kalem release is therefore presumed to be lost, although a few stills from the film survive in advertisements printed in 1912 trade publications.

== Plot ==
During the American Civil War, before leaving home to join his Confederate company as a drummer boy, Alma's young brother Charles gives her a final lesson on his drum. Six months later he is killed while advancing with his fellow soldiers in battle, and his body is sent home for burial. Devastated by her brother's death, Alma is determined to take his place. She dons his uniform, modifies her appearance, and enlists in the army under a false name to serve as another drummer "boy". Soon, though, Alma is recognized among the Southern troops by an "old friend", Lieutenant Lightfoot, but he promises to keep her true identity and gender a secret.

The next morning Confederate and Federal (Note: In references about the American Civil War, land and naval forces fighting on behalf of the United States against the Confederate States of America are generally referred to as either "Federal" or "Union" forces. In 1912 trade publications, the terms were used interchangeably, although at that time "Federal" was used more often in Kalem promotions of the film and in descriptions of its storyline descriptions.) forces prepare their positions to engage in another great battle near Vicksburg, Mississippi. As part of the Northern forces' preparations, "Yankee" Lieutenant Summers is ordered to place a cannon at the extreme left flank of the Federal line. The commander of the Confederate troops recognizes the deadly tactical advantage of that heavy weapon's location, so he orders the company to which Alma is attached to either capture the cannon during the attack or at least put it out of action. Southern forces now begin their charge with their still-disguised drummer steadily beating her drum along the front rank of soldiers. Alma succeeds during the fighting to spike and disable the enemy's artillery piece. Wounded in the assault, she collapses as Federal forces retreat, but in the aftermath she is found on the battlefield by a Northern soldier, who takes her to a Federal hospital, where her identity is revealed. Later there is an exchange of prisoners, and the story concludes happily with a double wedding, with what university professor and film historian Bruce Chadwick describes in his 2001 work The Reel Civil War as a "perfect reconciliation ending". In an allegorical scene that could be interpreted as the reunification of a divided nation, the zealous Southern rebel Alma marries "the soldier who captured her". (Note: This plot summary was composed from descriptions in 1912 reviews of the film published in The Bioscope, The Moving Picture World, The Bulletin, and in other trade publications and period newspapers cited herein.)

== Cast ==
- Miriam Cooper as Alma, the Drummer Girl (Note: During her time working for Kalem, in 1912 and 1913, the spelling of actress Miriam Cooper's forename varies in cast listings in issues of the Kalem Kalendar and in the company's film promotions in trade publications as well as in newspapers from that period. Her first name is also spelled "Mariam", "Marian", "Merian", "Mirian", and "Marion".)
- Guy Coombs as Confederate Lieutenant Lightfoot
- Anna Q. Nilsson as Rose Beecher
- Hal Clements as Federal Lieutenant Summers
- Leo Berger as Charles, Alma's younger brother
- Henry Hallam in undetermined role
- Helen Lindroth in undetermined role
- Extras hired locally for battle scenes (uncredited)

== Production ==
Kalem's The Drummer Girl of Vicksburg was part of a series of films that the company released in the United States between 1911 and 1915 to mark the 50th anniversary of the Civil War. In 1912 alone Kalem produced and Kenean Buel directed at least a dozen additional dramas set during that conflict: The Bugler of Battery B, The Siege of Petersburg, A Spartan Mother, The Tide of Battle, The Darling of the C.S.A., War's Havoc, The Battle of Pottsburg Bridge, 'Fighting Dan' McCool, Under a Flag of Truce, The Soldier Brothers of Susanna, Saved From Court Martial, and The Confederate Ironclad. (Note: The cited titles of Kalem's Civil War films were compiled from 1912 issues of the company's Kalem Kalendar, copies of which are available on the Internet Archive.)

=== Filming in Florida ===
All of the previously noted Kalem dramas, including The Drummer Girl of Vicksburg, were filmed in northeastern Florida at the company's "winter studio", which was located next to the St. Johns River "about fifteen minutes by trolley" from downtown Jacksonville. There, since the autumn of 1908, Kalem had leased spaces in an old three-story hotel to serve as the company's production headquarters in Florida. The hotel, "Roseland", was situated on three acres that also accommodated a large home, several cabins, and other outbuildings. Nearby, at the river, were a "big wharf" and "boats of all kinds", some of which served as props in screenplays and others to transport Director Buel, his camera operators, principal cast members, and any locally hired extras around the "territory rich in locations" for filming. Among other motion picture props assembled and stored on the Roseland properties for staging The Drummer Girl of Vicksburg and other war-related productions were supplies of Confederate and Federal uniforms, assorted military accoutrements, and various weapons, including several 1860s field cannons with their caissons for hauling ammunition. (Note: See Wikipedia Commons' photograph "File:Roseland Hotel 1908.jpg", which shows pieces of Civil War artillery equipment stored on the grounds of Kalem's Florida studio.)

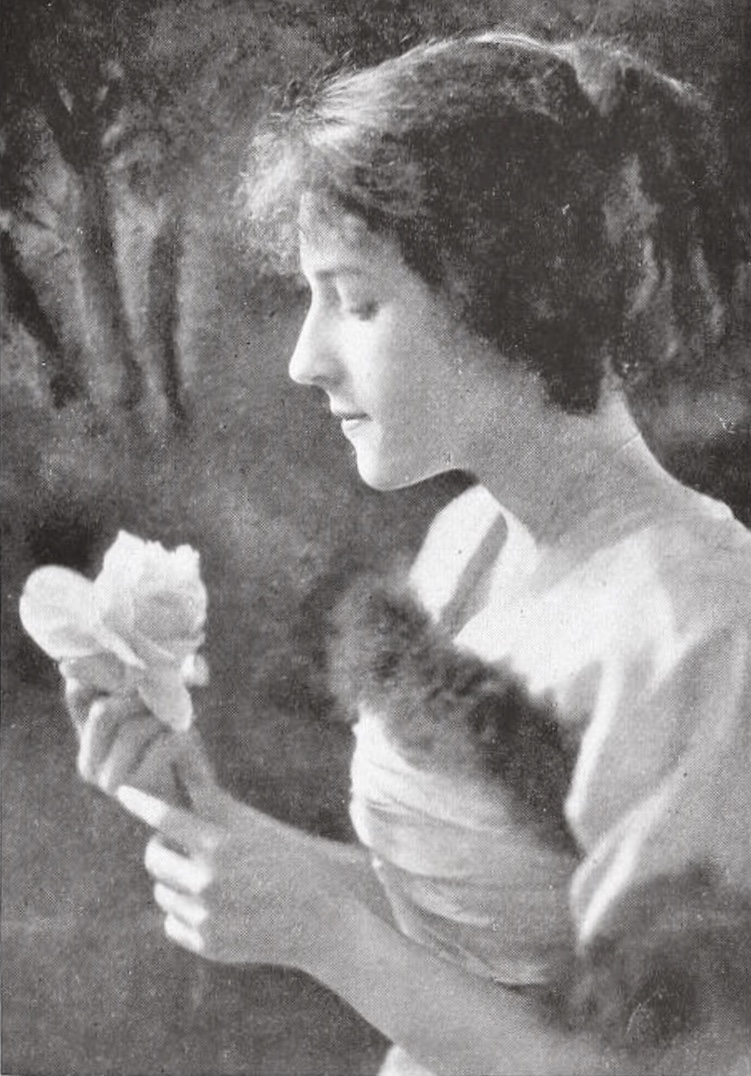
Kalem publicity photo of Miriam Cooper without her "drummer boy" uniform, 1912

Miriam Cooper, who performed as the title character in The Drummer Girl of Vicksburg, was in 1912 a recent addition to Kalem's Florida company of players. For her work on this film and others, the 20-year-old actress earned a salary of "thirty-five dollars a week and expenses", which included accommodations while on location at the winter studio. (Note: Born in Baltimore, Maryland on November 7, 1891, Cooper was 20 years old when The Drummer Girl of Vicksburg was filmed in the spring of 1912.) Cooper describes in her 1973 memoir Dark Lady of the Silents how she and her fellow actors at the Roseland site resided in "a big old house called Fairfield", a residence that faced the river and featured double wraparound verandas overlooking "lush green growth". She also reflects in her memoir about her performances there on various war-related films:

Perhaps because it was the fiftieth anniversary of the Civil War, we did a lot of war pictures. I was in so many Civil War one-reelers for Kalem that they all run together in my mind. We'd do one a week. Often the story required me to be disguised as a boy. I remember one in which I had a cap over my long hair. At the dramatic moment my cap fell off and, big surprise, I was a girl doing the dangerous job of a boy.

Although Kalem in 1912 was headquartered in New York City on West 24th Street in Manhattan, the company in its Civil War films routinely presented screenplays of heroic, sympathetic Southern civilians and soldiers fighting against and defeating Northern forces, recurring themes that prompted additional comments by Miriam Cooper in her memoir. "In picture after picture", she writes, "we won the war for the Confederates fifty years after the war was over." The Maryland-born actress then goes on to describe how her on-screen identity as a Southern heroine and action performer grew with these Kalem Civil War pictures:

In another one-reeler I rowed a boat out to set fire to the bridge and cut off the Yankees. Recently I read in The Moving Picture World of 1912 some of the synopses of Kalem films. They called me plucky, brave, intrepid and courageous. I ran trains, shot cannons, burned bridges, spied, all for the Confederates. I don't see how the Yankees won the war.

Cooper recounts too in some detail how she prepared specifically for her lead role in The Drummer Girl of Vicksburg and how in that process she gained valuable experience as an actor both on and off camera:

I learned to play a drum for this picture—de-dum, de-dum, de dum dum dum. And I played it over and over and over. I drove everyone crazy with my de dum dum dum. And then nobody heard it in the picture...When I wasn't working in a scene there were many other things to do. I kept busy so I wouldn't be homesick. I learned to ride horseback. The company rented lots of horses for the war scenes, and the local people taught me. Soon I began playing roles on horseback.

=== "Authentic equipment" used in the film ===
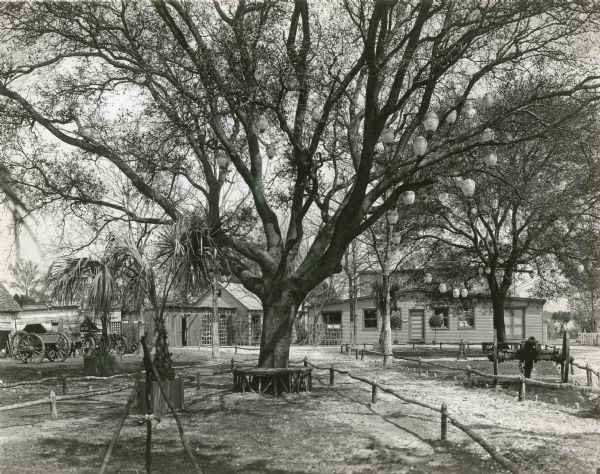
Grounds of Kalem's "winter studio" outside Jacksonville, Florida, where The Drummer Girl of Vicksburg was filmed. Note (far left and right) the Civil War-era cannons and caissons, likely some of the same artillery pieces used in this production's battle scenes.

In Kalem's preparations for staging this film and other Civil War dramas in 1912, the company had announced in December 1911 that it was continuing to purchase "authentic equipment" for its growing inventories of 1860s uniforms, swords, pistols, longarms, and heavy weapons:

A representative of the Kalem Company recently found in storage two large mounted cannons, with complete equipment, which were used by the Confederates in the defense of Atlanta. The entire outfits were in a perfect state of preservation and after extensive negotiations the Kalem Company secured them. These cannons, weighing over two tons each, were shipped by steamer over the Clyde Line to Jacksonville, Florida, where the Kalem war dramas are produced.... (Note: On page 148 in the September 1912 issue of The Motion Picture Story Magazine, an editorial note states, "Kalem uniforms and weaponry are actually of the Civil War period, having been purchased from Government arsenals.")

Kalem's efforts to collect military items actually used during the Civil War or that were generally available at the time of the conflict earned the company a reputation for excellence and authenticity among audiences and with film reviewers, one of whom in 1912 specifically praised The Drummer Girl of Vicksburg for "showing some of the most realistic war scenes ever portrayed on the screen." Even army veterans in theater audiences and enthusiasts for militaria expressed their admiration for Kalem's attention to detail, especially when comparing its productions to those being presented by other studios. In its September 1912 issue, The Motion Picture Story Magazine shares with its readers a letter the trade publication received from G. L. Eskew of Charleston, West Virginia:

Dear Sir: I am tempted to say a word or two in regard to Civil War Pictures, and especially the Kalem's... Altho [sic] I was not born until nearly thirty years after the close of the war, I have kept myself posted in regard to the uniforms, equipment, etc., used by Southern troops, and it appears rather ridiculous to me to see a Confederate major with United States shoulder straps, denoting captain, shoot his opponent with an up-to-date, six-shot, breech-loading pistol. Confederate officers never wore shoulder straps. The rank was designated by stars or bars on the collar. Breech-loading pistols were not used in the Confederate army at all. They were not invented until about 1869. These little details are so noticeable, and often spoil the effect of a good picture. Many old soldiers, Confederate and Federal, have remarked to me about these defects. Kalem pays more attention to details, and the uniforms look like the "genuine article." I wish to compliment them. We will all agree, I think, that the details count for much, so here's a toast to Kalem: May your War Plays continue to bring back "Old Days" to the old soldiers.

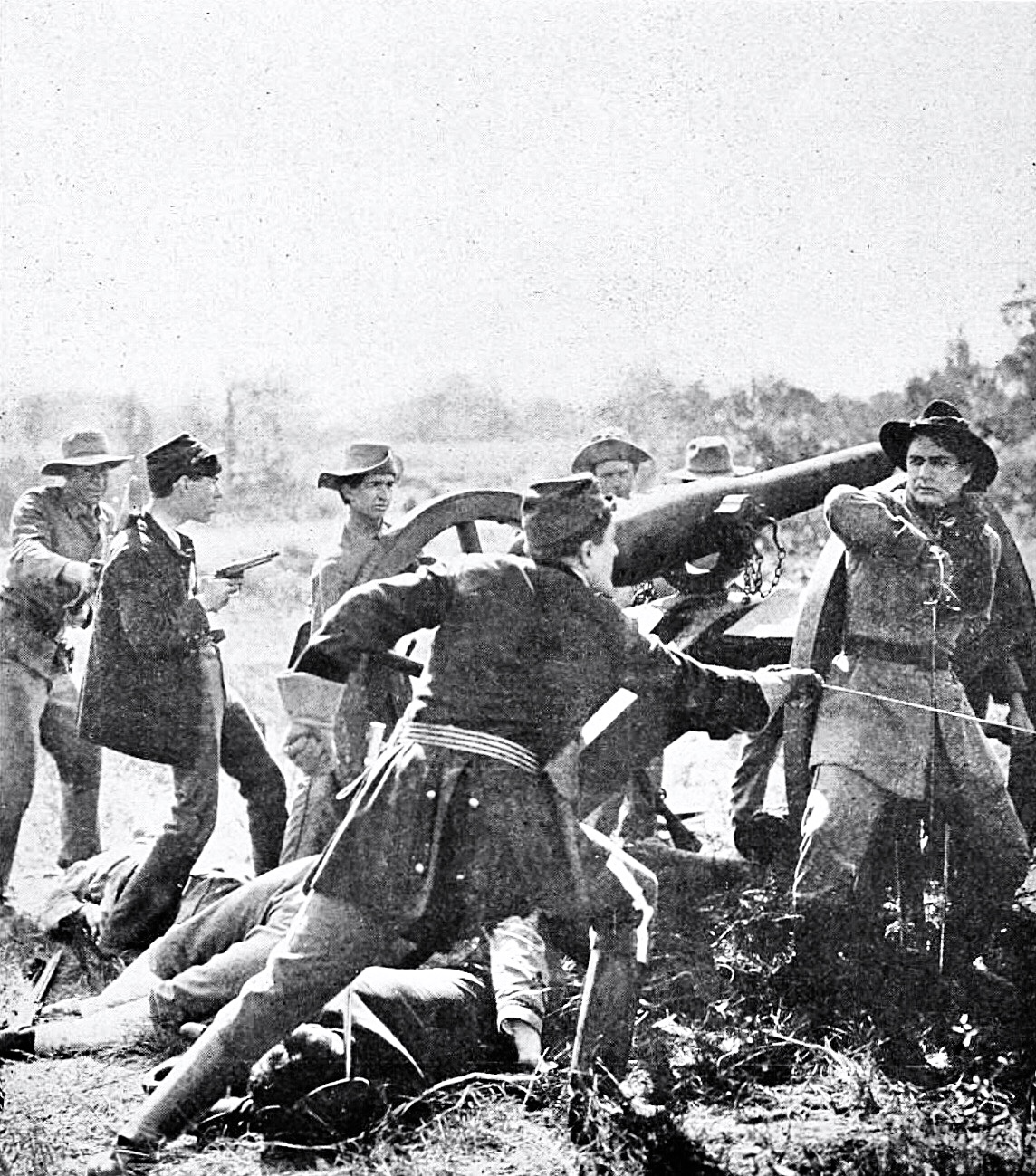
Another still from the film showing the climactic battle scene with actor Guy Coombs at far right

Caring for all of the military gear and weapons used to stage The Drummer Girl of Vicksburg and other war films shot in Florida was a costly, time-consuming operation for Kalem. In the April 15, 1912 issue of the bimonthly publication Kalem Kalendar, the company mentions how those expenditures and others provided many jobs to residents in and around Jacksonville:

The Jacksonville company...has become a community in itself and oftentimes entertains many interested visitors. A force of men is employed to take care of the guns and cannon while others look after the uniforms which would equip two complete armies. The operations of this company have furnished a season's work for hundreds of men who have taken part in the spectacular battle scenes.

== Release, distribution, and promotion ==
Kalem officially released the film in the United States on June 5, 1912. Ten weeks later, by mid-August, the military drama began circulating to cinemas throughout England and soon to other European markets. In Germany, for example, the weekly Berlin trade publication Lichtbild Bühne announces in its September 21, 1912 edition that Die Trommlerin von Vicksburg (The Girl Drummer of Vicksburg) had been generally available for rent or purchase from German film distributors since the 14th of that month.

Back in the United States, the film continued to circulate for many months after its release. Assorted newspapers were reporting in February and March 1913 that the Civil War drama was even being screened at sparsely populated, remote venues, such as Valhalla Hall in Gardnerville, Nevada and at the Tonawama Theatre in Burns, Oregon, where the production was promoted as "a realistic war story full of patriotism and sure to please." By February 1913, the film had also reached Alaska, where it was being featured at the Dream Theatre in the gold-mining town of Ketchikan.

=== Special music for "25 cents" and theater posters ===
To promote the motion picture and to enhance its presentation to audiences, Kalem offered to provide theater owners "'fine music with a fine picture'". The company, for 25 cents per order, sent customers sheet music for a piano score "simply arranged and especially prepared for this feature" by composer Walter Cleveland Simon. A copy of that 1912 printed score is preserved on microfilm at the Library of Congress under the identification title "Special piano music for: The Drummer Girl of Vicksburg" and held as part of the library's catalog of "Music for Silent Films, 1894-1929". The sale of accompanying music for The Drummer Girl of Vicksburg was not a unique offer by Kalem for its productions in 1912. That year the company also offered piano scores composed by Simon for other Civil War releases such as A Spartan Mother, War's Havoc, and 'Fighting Dan' McCool.

In addition to offering theater owners copies of Walter Simon's special musical score for The Drummer Girl of Vicksburg, Kalem informed "exhibitors" that they could obtain from their regional distributors or "exchanges" a supply of four-color lithographed posters for the film, which would be "unfailing business producers" in attracting audiences. The posters were available in varying sizes, in "one, three and six sheet" formats.

== Reception in 1912 ==
The film received generally positive reviews in contemporary American trade publications and exuberant promotion in newspapers in the North, South, and across the United States. The Vermont newspaper The Barre Daily Times in its advertising invited local residents to experience "War in all its realism", in a production replete with "heroic deeds” and a "compelling story of self-sacrifice". In Connecticut, the Norwich Bulletin in its July 15, 1912 issue informs its readers of the picture's opening at the town's local theater:

"The Drummer Girl of Vicksburg" is the thrilling war drama that is the featured picture at the Breed [Theatre] today and it is produced by the celebrated Kalem company, which has attained such fame for its masterly civil war stories. It is a story which cannot fail to appeal to all lovers of this class of pictures, for it portrays a sister who has lost her little brother, whose life went out, leading the Confederate forces in battle. She pluckily takes up his work where he left off and leads the army on to victory.

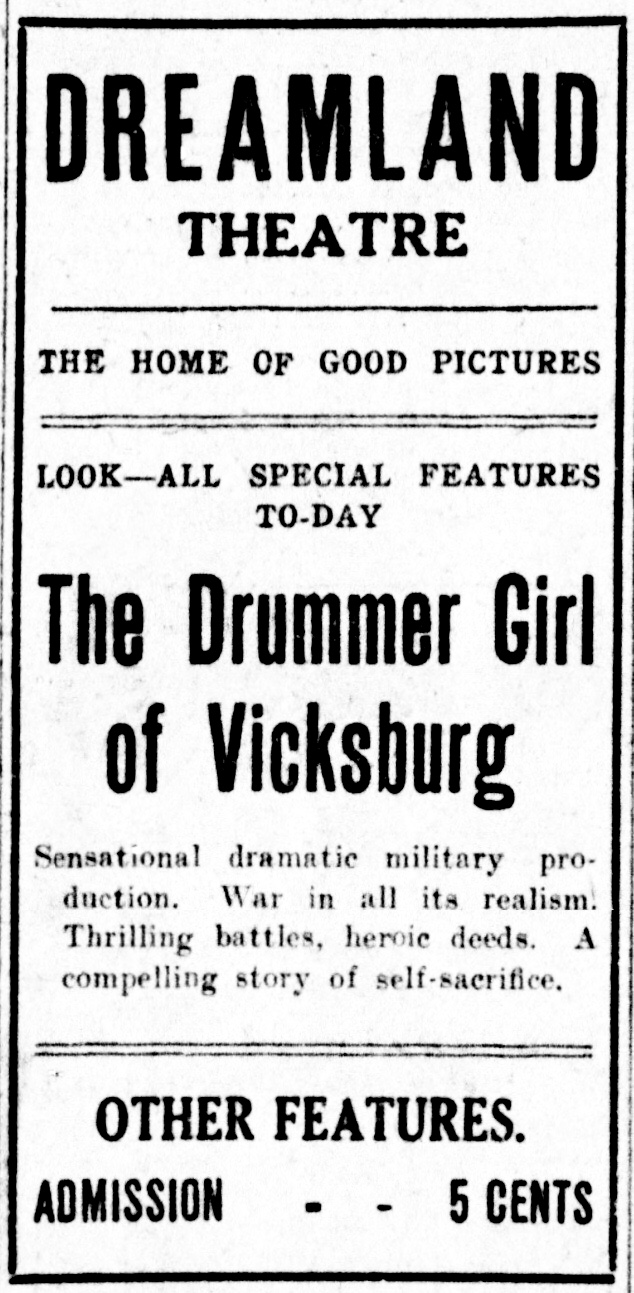
Film's promotion in The Barre Daily Times in Vermont, August 1912

In Hattiesburg, Mississippi, a town in the Deep South and located about 130 miles from Vicksburg, the local newspaper announced in early October 1912 a special screening of the film and repeated some of Kalem Company's own self-promotion as a producer of well-staged and "thrilling" Civil War films, as well as comments about "Marion" [sic] Cooper's rising popularity as a screen performer:

The patrons of the Lomo [Theatre] know what to expect when one of Kalem's stupendous military productions is announced. "The Drummer Girl of Vicksburg" is their latest feature. Miss Marion Cooper, the athletic young actress, whose daring feats in "The Battle of Pottsburg Bridge" and "The Tide of Battle" have caused universal comment, enacts a part which was written especially to portray her remarkable versatility. The strategy of the two armies and the fearlessness of the young southern girl furnish many exciting moments.

Out in the western part of the United States, in Pendleton, Oregon, the East Oregonian describes the film to its readers in its July 15, 1912 edition, characterizing it as a "romantic Civil War production full of thrilling action". The newspaper then adds a detail about the vintage weaponry shown in the motion picture, a detail that likely drew additional attention from moviegoers who were interested in various types of artillery used during the war: "In this picture there is given a representation of a battery of four parrot guns [sic] in action."

== Film's preservation status ==
Neither a copy nor partial footage of The Drummer Girl of Vicksburg in any format is listed among the holdings of major film repositories and silent-film databases in North America and Europe, including the Library of Congress, the George Eastman Museum, the Museum of Modern Art's collection of moving images, the UCLA Film and Television Archives, the National Film Preservation Foundation, the Library and Archives Canada (LAC), the British Film Institute, Cinémathèque Française, the EYE Filmmuseum in Amsterdam, and other catalogs for silent motion pictures accessible through the European Film Gateway (EFG). While searches continue to locate a negative or positive copy of this Kalem production, or even an original fragment from the film, the 1912 release is currently presumed to be lost.
