= Captain Nell =

- Directed by: Edwin S. Porter
- Produced by: Edison Manufacturing Company
- Starring: Miriam Nesbitt; Guy Coombs
- Distributed by: General Film Company
- Release date: May 23, 1911
- Running time: 1 reel
- Country: USA
- Language: Silent..English titles

Captain Nell is a 1911 silent drama short directed by Edwin S. Porter. It was produced by Edison Manufacturing Company and distributed by General Film Company.

== Cast ==
- Miriam Nesbitt - Captain Nell of the Salvation Army
- Charles Ogle - Mr. Randolph, Harry's Father
- William West - The Confidential Clerk
- Guy Coombs - Harry Randolph, the Son

== See also ==
- Edwin S. Porter filmography
