= The Love Burglar =

1919 film by James Cruze

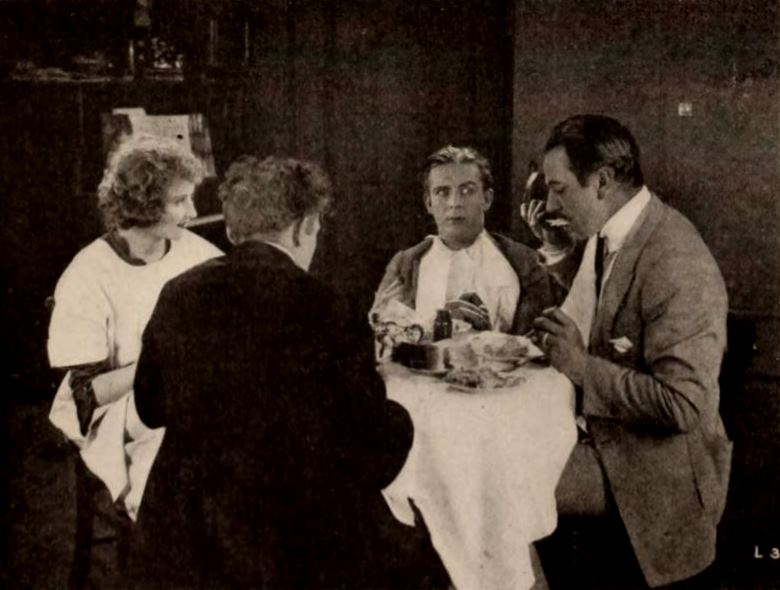
- Film still. left-to-right:Anna Nilsson, Wally Reid, Wally Beery. Ray Hatton back to camera.
- Directed by: James Cruze
- Screenplay by: Walter Woods
- Based on: One of Us by Jack Lait
- Produced by: Jesse L. Lasky
- Starring: Wallace Reid; Anna Q. Nilsson; Raymond Hatton; Wallace Beery; Wilton Taylor; Edmund Burns
- Cinematography: Frank Urson
- Production company: Famous Players–Lasky Corporation
- Distributed by: Paramount Pictures
- Release date: July 13, 1919
- Running time: 50 minutes
- Country: United States
- Language: Silent (English intertitles)

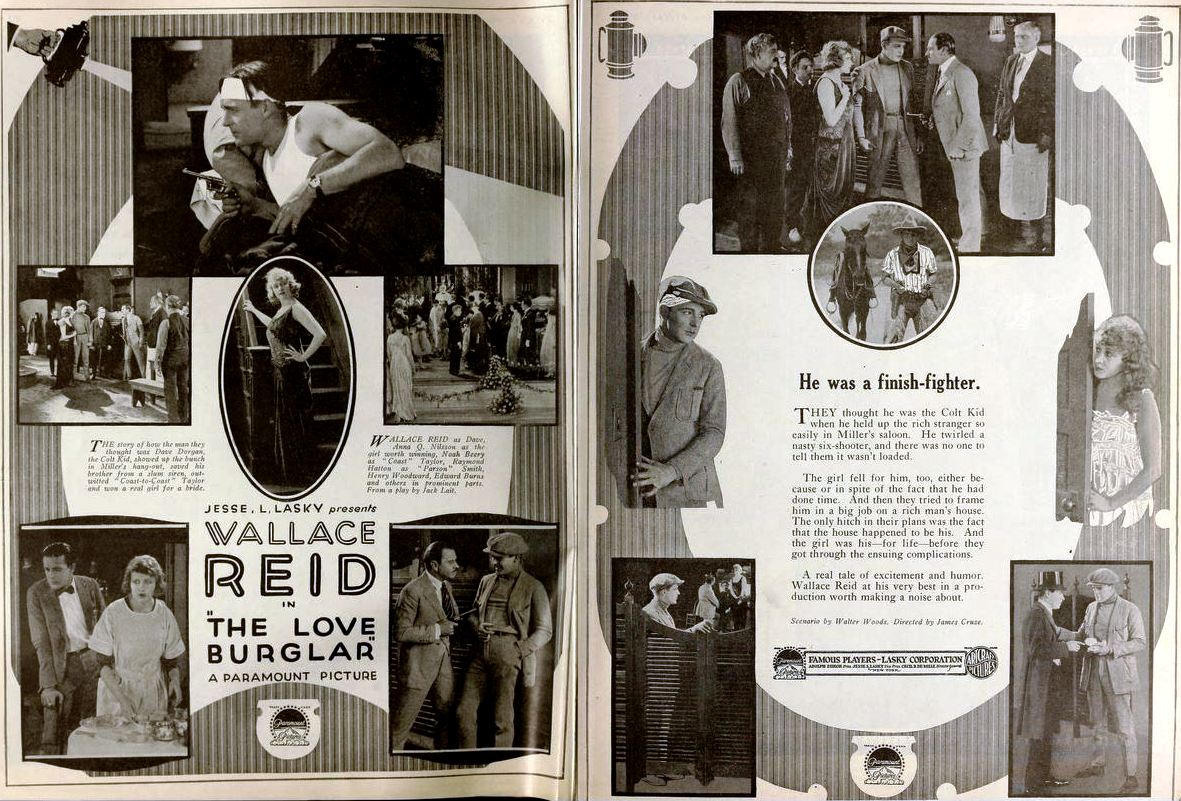
period advertisement. Press herald.

The Love Burglar is a 1919 American silent drama film directed by James Cruze, written by Walter Woods based upon a play by Jack Lait, and starring Wallace Reid, Anna Q. Nilsson, Raymond Hatton, Wallace Beery, Wilton Taylor, and Edmund Burns. The film was released on July 13, 1919, by Paramount Pictures.

== Plot ==
As described in a film magazine, Joan Gray, a novelist who is living in the underworld to absorb its atmosphere for her next work, finds herself seriously menaced by Coast-to-Coast Taylor, a prominent figure of the district who determines to win her by force if necessary. As the situation reaches a climax she is rescued by the famous criminal who has just been released from prison. She continues to sing at the low café and accepts the admiring protection of the crook. The latter, unknown to her, is David Strong, a member of the upper world whose love of adventure and her accounts for his assumption of a famous crook's identity. Matters come to a crisis when his associates urge him to rob a wealthy house, which incidentally is his own home. Joan seeks to prevent it and the real crook arrives in time to also take a hand. David manages to extradite Joan and himself from the situation, and after introductions they plight their troth.

== Cast ==
- Wallace Reid as David Strong
- Anna Q. Nilsson as Joan Gray
- Raymond Hatton as Parson Smith
- Wallace Beery as Coast-to-Coast Taylor
- Wilton Taylor as Bull Miller
- Edmund Burns as Arthur Strong
- Alice Terry as Elsie Strong
- Richard Wayne as Rosswell
- Henry Woodward as Dave Dorgan
- Loyola O'Connor as Mrs. Eleanor Strong

== Preservation ==
In February of 2021, The Love Burglar was cited by the National Film Preservation Board on their Lost U.S. Silent Feature Films list and is therefore presumed lost.

== See also ==
- Wallace Reid filmography
