= Hal Clements =

American actor

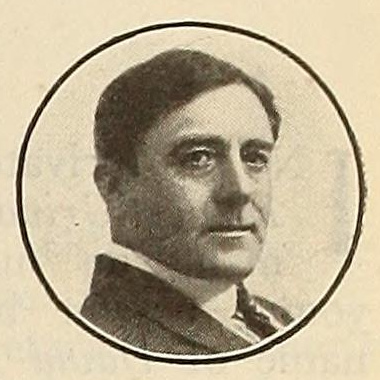
Hal Clements

Hal Clements (1869-1957) was an American actor and director of silent films. He starred in dozens of silent films. He married writer Olga Printzlau.

Clements was part of Kalem Studio's Jacksonville film crew. In 1914, he directed and managed the studio's comedy unit in Santa Monica featuring Ruth Roland and John Brennan. He portrayed General John Pershing in a Thomas Ince film. In 1916 he was managing director of the new Gate City Feature Film Company.

== Filmography ==
- Battle of Pottsburg Bridge (1912)
- The Drummer Girl of Vicksburg (1912)
- Uncle Tom's Cabin (1913)
- The Grim Toll of War (1913)
- O'Brien Finds a Way (1914)
- Armstrong's Wife (1915)
- Out of the Darkness (1915)
- The Unknown (1915)
- The Secret Sin (1915)
- The Immigrant (1915)
- The Girl Telegrapher's Nerve (1916)
- Miss Jackie of the Army (1917)
- An American Live Wire (1918)
- Other Men's Wives (1919)
- An Innocent Adventuress (1919)
- The Siege of Petersburg
- The Sacrifice at the Spillway
- The Man Who Could Not Lose, a Biograph film, as Jack Carter
- Seventeen (1940)
- Wichita (1955)
