= Aida (1911 film) =

1911 film

- Directed by: Oscar Apfel; J. Searle Dawley
- Starring: Mary Fuller; Marc McDermott; Nancy Avril; Charles Ogle
- Release date: 5 May 1911
- Country: United States
- Language: English

Aida is a 1911 American film directed by Oscar Apfel and J. Searle Dawley and starring Mary Fuller, Marc McDermott, Nancy Avril and Charles Ogle. It was produced by Edison Film Company.

== Cast ==
- Guy Coombs as King of Ethiopia, Aida's Father
- Robert Brower as High Priest of Isis
- Charles Ogle as King of Egypt
- Marc McDermott as Radames
- Nancy Avril as Amneris
- Mary Fuller as Aida
