= The Secret Sin =

1915 film by Frank Reicher

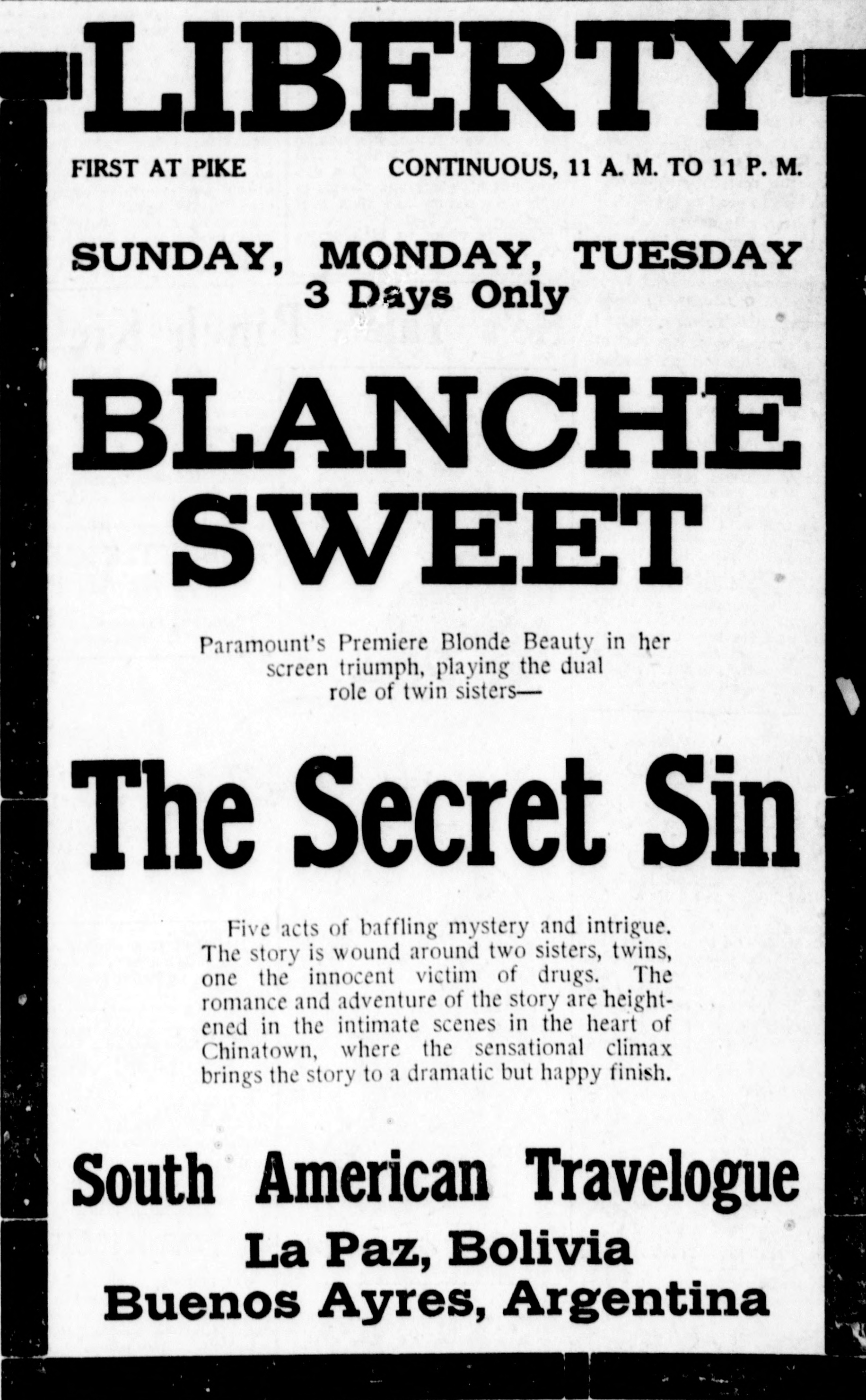
- Newspaper advertisement
- Directed by: Frank Reicher
- Written by: Margaret Turnbull (story & scenario)
- Produced by: Jesse L. Lasky
- Starring: Blanche Sweet; Thomas Meighan; Sessue Hayakawa
- Cinematography: Walter Stradling
- Distributed by: Paramount Pictures
- Release date: October 21, 1915
- Running time: 5 reels
- Country: United States
- Language: Silent (English intertitles)

The Secret Sin is a surviving 1915 American silent drama film produced by Jesse L. Lasky and distributed by Paramount Pictures. It was directed by Frank Reicher and starred Blanche Sweet, Thomas Meighan and Sessue Hayakawa. This film often thought lost actually survives at the Library of Congress and along with a few other surviving Lasky features from 1915 to 1917 allows viewing of Blanche Sweet during her Paramount period immediately after she left D. W. Griffith's employ. In this film Sweet has a rare chance to act in a double exposure scene playing two different characters.

== Cast ==
- Blanche Sweet - Edith Martin/Grace Martin
- Hal Clements - Dan Martin
- Sessue Hayakawa - Lin Foo
- Alice Knowland - Mrs. Martin
- Thomas Meighan - Jack Herron

== See also ==
- Blanche Sweet filmography
