= Hearts Aflame (film) =

1923 film directed by Reginald Barker

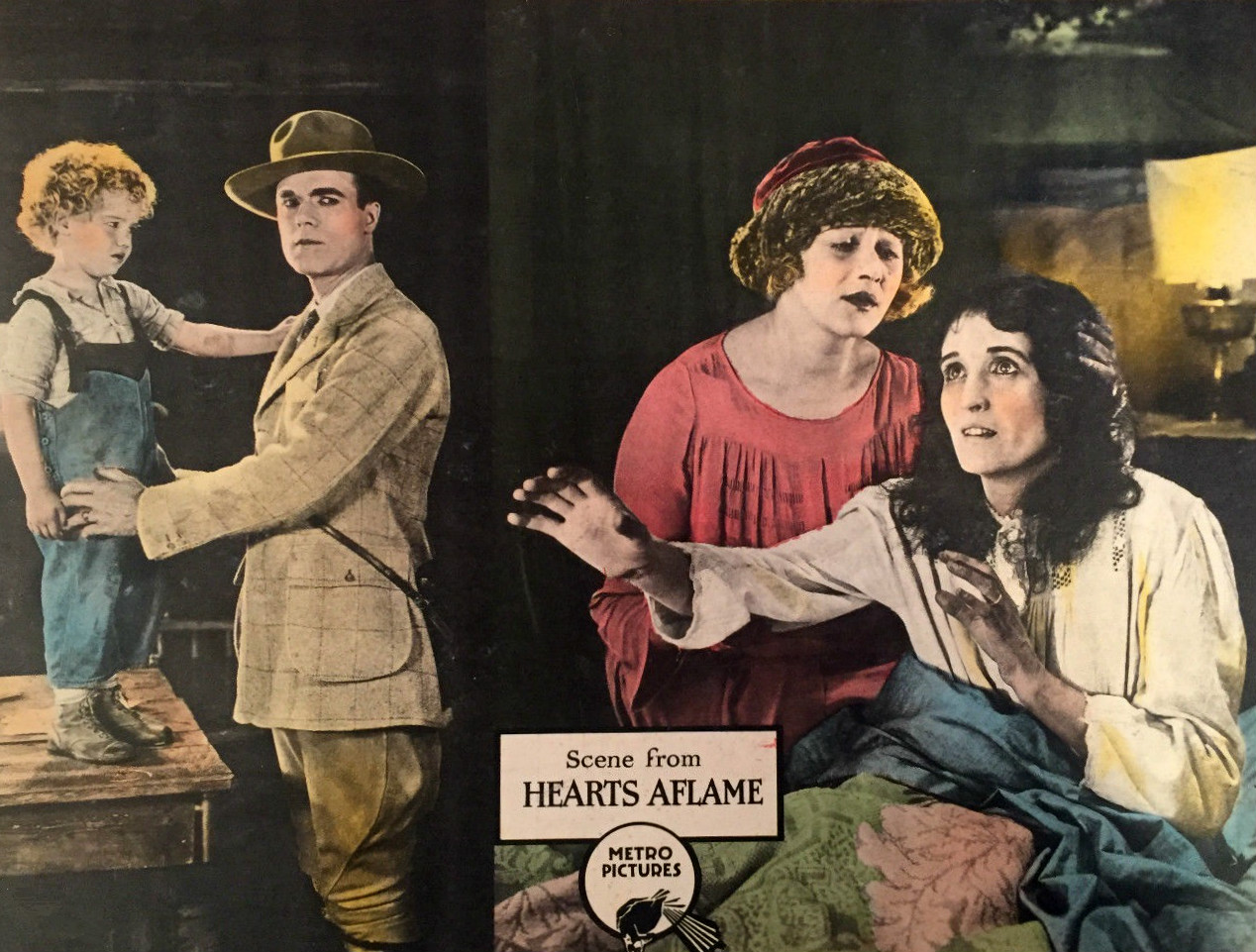
- Lobby card
- Directed by: Reginald Barker
- Written by: J. G. Hawks; Gordon Rigby
- Based on: Timber by Harold Titus
- Starring: Frank Keenan; Anna Q. Nilsson; Craig Ward
- Cinematography: Percy Hilburn (French)
- Production company: Louis B. Mayer Productions
- Distributed by: Metro Pictures Corporation; Pathé Consortium Cinéma (France)
- Release date: January 1, 1923
- Running time: 8110 feet (9 reels)
- Country: United States
- Language: Silent (English intertitles)

Hearts Aflame is a 1923 American silent melodrama film directed by Reginald Barker and starring Frank Keenan, Anna Q. Nilsson, and Craig Ward. The son of a retired timber baron meets and falls in love with a Michigan woman who refuses to sell her land unless the buyer promises to replant to replace the trees that are to be cut down.

== Plot ==
As described in a film magazine, retired millionaire lumberman Luke Taylor (Keenan) sends his son John (Ward) to Michigan to salvage some logs. While John is there he meets Helen Foraker (Nilsson), who owns a vast amount of uncut timber but refuses to sell unless the purchaser consents to replant the trees. Her forests were left to her by her father who planted them and she seeks to carry out his wish. Jim Harris (Heck), an unscrupulous land dealer, tries to force her to sell the land without this provision. John wires his father to come. The old man insists on buying the land, but also refuses to replant any cuttings. Jim again attempts to get the property for himself and likewise is refused by Helen, so he bribes a half-wit into setting the forest afire. John discovers the fire and rushes to aid. He and Helen take a logging train engine and succeed in bring through some explosives. The men work all night and finally the ridge is blown up, saving half the forest. John then not only agrees to replant the forest, but also to lend Helen any amount of money she needs and gives the two lovers his blessing.

== Cast ==
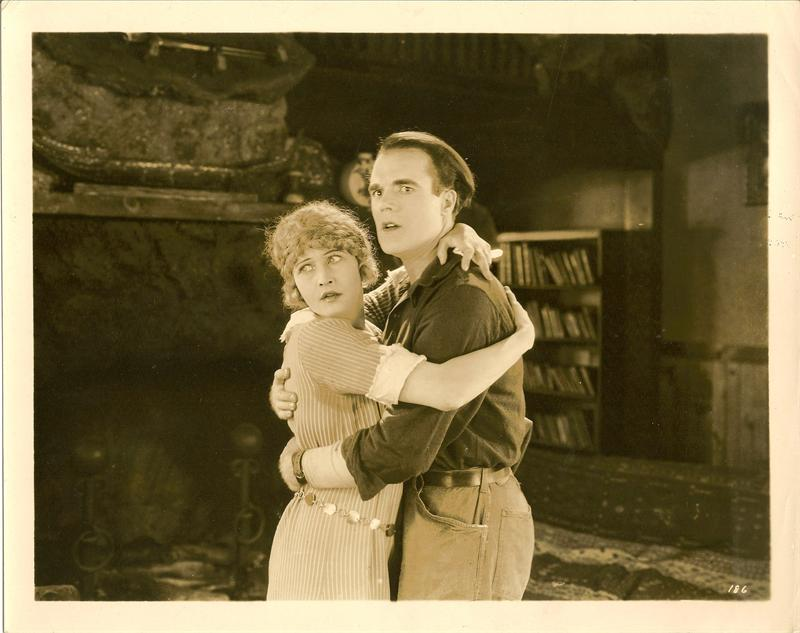
Ana Q. Nilsson and Craig Ward in a scene

- Frank Keenan as Luke Taylor
- Anna Q. Nilsson as Helen Foraker
- Craig Ward as John Taylor
- Richard Headrick as Bobby Kildare
- Russell Simpson as Black Joe
- Richard Tucker as Philip Rowe
- Stanton Heck as Jim Harris
- Martha Mattox as Aunty May
- Walt Whitman as Charley Stump
- Joan Standing as Ginger
- Ralph Cloninger as Thad Parker
- Lee Shumway as Milt Goddard
- John Dill as Lucius Kildare
- Gordon Magee as Sheriff (as Gordon McGee)
- Irene Hunt as Jennie Parker

== Production ==
Production started in early July 1922.

On August 28, a stunt went terribly awry in the Kootenays, British Columbia. "A six acre plot of ground was soaked with 700 gallons of gasoline and set afire for a scene in which Miss Nilsson was to drive a locomotive through the flames." Nilsson was severely burned and required a week to recuperate. Craig Ward and cameraman Percy Hilburn, filming from "an asbestos cabinet built on the side of the locomotive", were also injured.

== Preservation status ==
Hearts Aflame is now a lost film.
