= Soldiers of Fortune (1919 film) =

1919 film by Allan Dwan

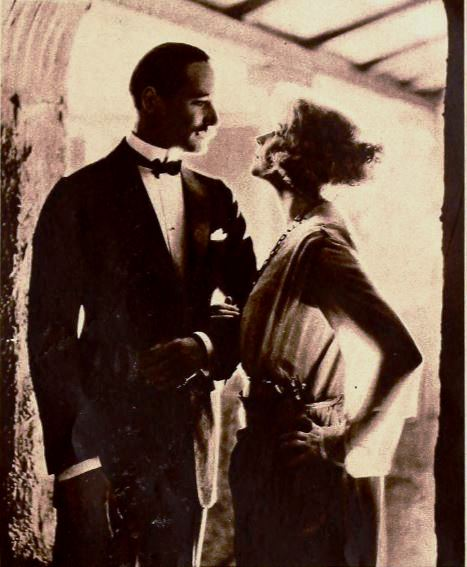
- Film still with Norman Kerry and Anna Q. Nilsson
- Directed by: Allan Dwan
- Written by: Allan Dwan
- Based on: Soldiers of Fortune; 1897 novel by Richard Harding Davis
- Produced by: Mayflower Photoplay Company
- Starring: Wallace Beery
- Distributed by: Realart Pictures Inc.
- Release date: November 22, 1919
- Running time: 70 minutes
- Country: United States
- Language: Silent (English intertitles)

Soldiers of Fortune is a lost 1919 American silent drama film directed by Allan Dwan and starring Wallace Beery. The film is based on the 1897 novel of the same name by Richard Harding Davis. It was produced by the Mayflower Photoplay Company. Richard Harding Davis's novel that inspired the film had already been brought to the screen in 1914 by William F. Haddock; that version of Soldiers of Fortune starred Dustin Farnum. The subject of both the 1914 and 1919 films is based on the Spanish–American War. The 1919 film was shot on the San Diego Fairgrounds at Balboa Park in San Diego, California. Distributed by Realart Pictures, the film was released in American theaters on November 22, 1919.

== Plot ==
Robert Clay, a noble American hero of humble means trying to do his best to help the war effort in the fictional capital Olancho in a small South American republic, but he meets a rich lady and they fall in love during the revolution. Clay is the engineer and general manager of the Valencia Mining Company in Olancho. Into his life come two daughters of Mr. Langham, the president of the Mining company. The older sister, Alice, is a New York City society girl. Her sister, Hope, is enthusiastic, generous and sweet. Clay meets Alice just before he sails for South America. He shares his admiration for her. Later, when he learns the family are going to Olancho also, he is very happy. But after getting to know Alice better he is sad. During her visit to Olancho a revolution starts, in this time she shows courage and to be a lady of charter. This attracts Clay to her, he ask her to marry him.

== Cast ==
- Wallace Beery as Mendoza
- Ogden Crane as Burke
- Ward Crane as Reginald King
- Norman Kerry as Robert Clay
- Fred Kohler as McWilliams
- Herold Lindsay as Mrs. Alvarez
- Wilfred Lucas as President Alvarez
- Melbourne MacDowell as Mr. Langham
- Philo McCullough as Captain Stuart
- Anna Q. Nilsson as Alice Langham
- Pauline Starke as Hope Langham
- Frank Wally as Teddy Langham

== Film stills and ads ==
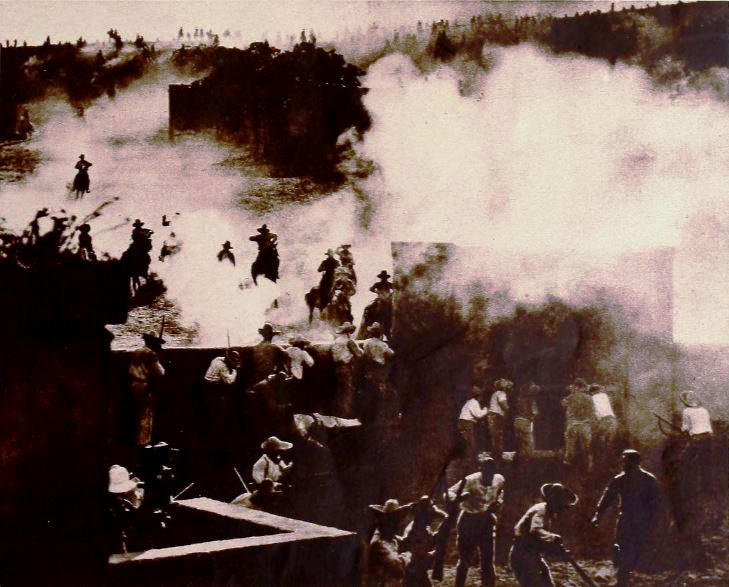
This scene, which used 600 mounted men, was filmed in California.

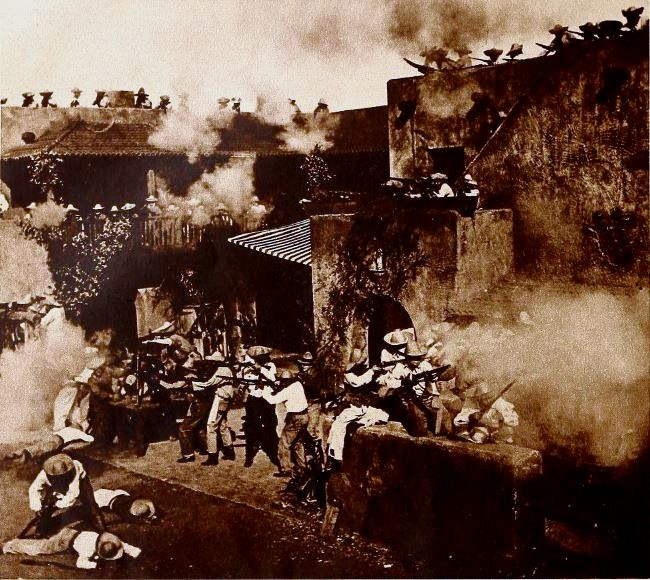
This battle scene was filmed in California.

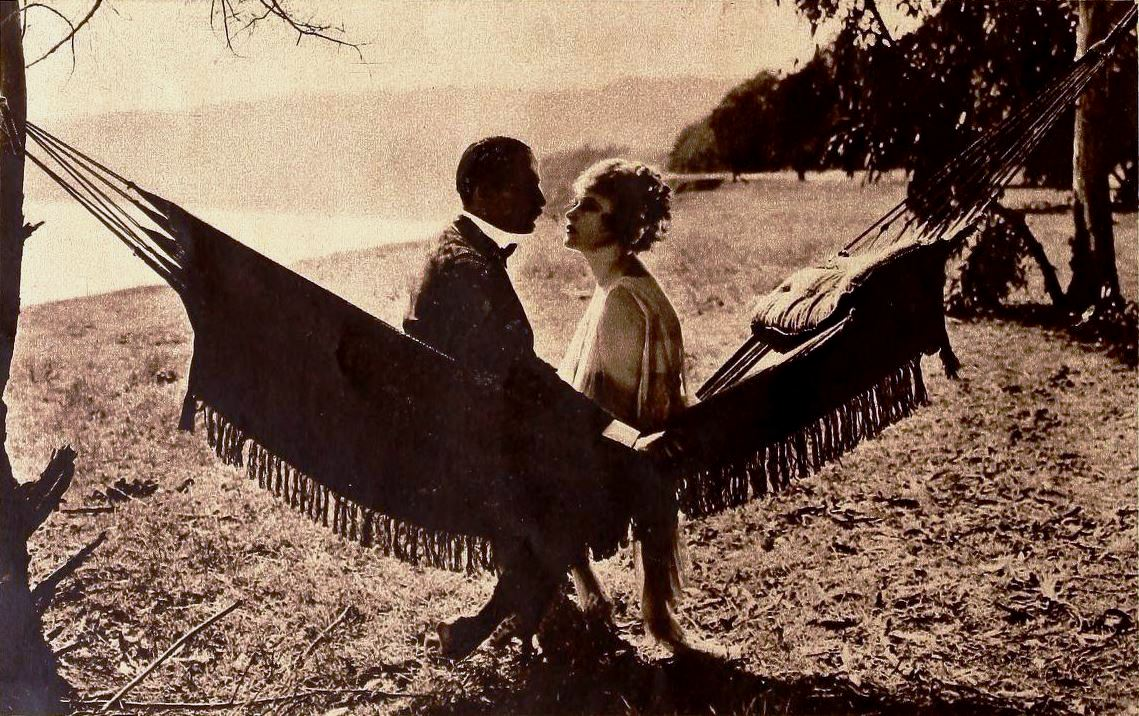
Scene with Kerry and Nilsson

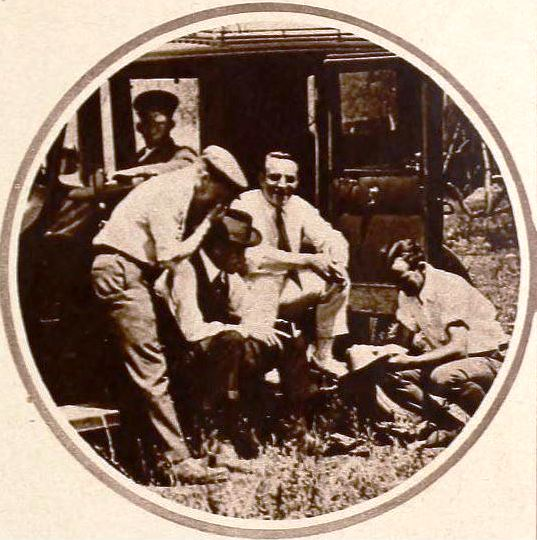
Soldiers of Fortune production crew

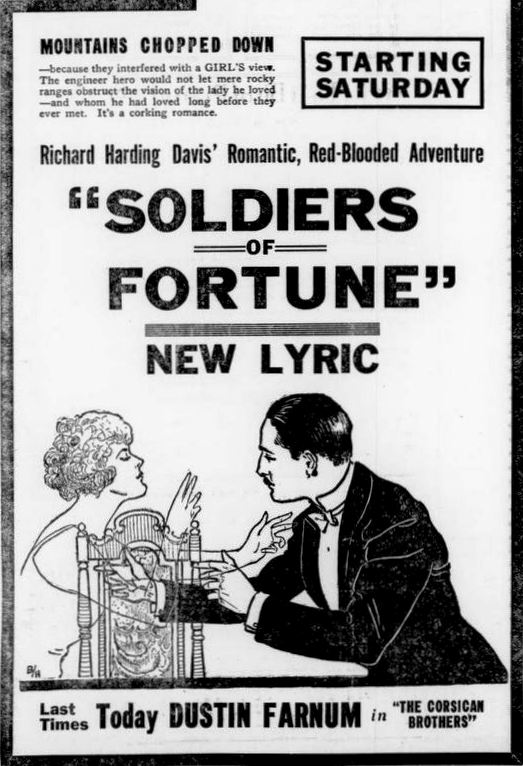
Newspaper ad for film
