= Other Men's Wives =

1919 film by Victor Schertzinger

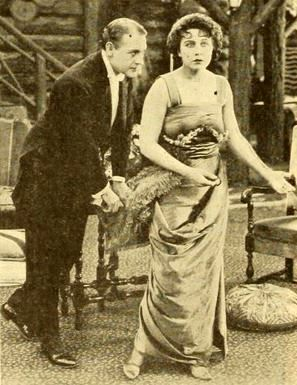
- Still with Holmes Herbert and Dorothy Dalton
- Directed by: Victor Schertzinger
- Screenplay by: C. Gardner Sullivan
- Produced by: Thomas H. Ince
- Starring: Dorothy Dalton; Forrest Stanley; Holmes Herbert; Dell Boone; Elsa Lorimer; Hal Clements
- Cinematography: John Stumar
- Music by: Victor Schertzinger
- Production company: Thomas H. Ince Corporation
- Distributed by: Paramount Pictures
- Release date: June 15, 1919
- Running time: 60 minutes
- Country: United States
- Language: Silent (English intertitles)

Other Men's Wives is a lost 1919 American silent drama film directed by Victor Schertzinger and written by C. Gardner Sullivan. The film stars Dorothy Dalton, Forrest Stanley, Holmes Herbert, Dell Boone, Elsa Lorimer, and Hal Clements. The film was released on June 15, 1919, by Paramount Pictures.

== Plot ==
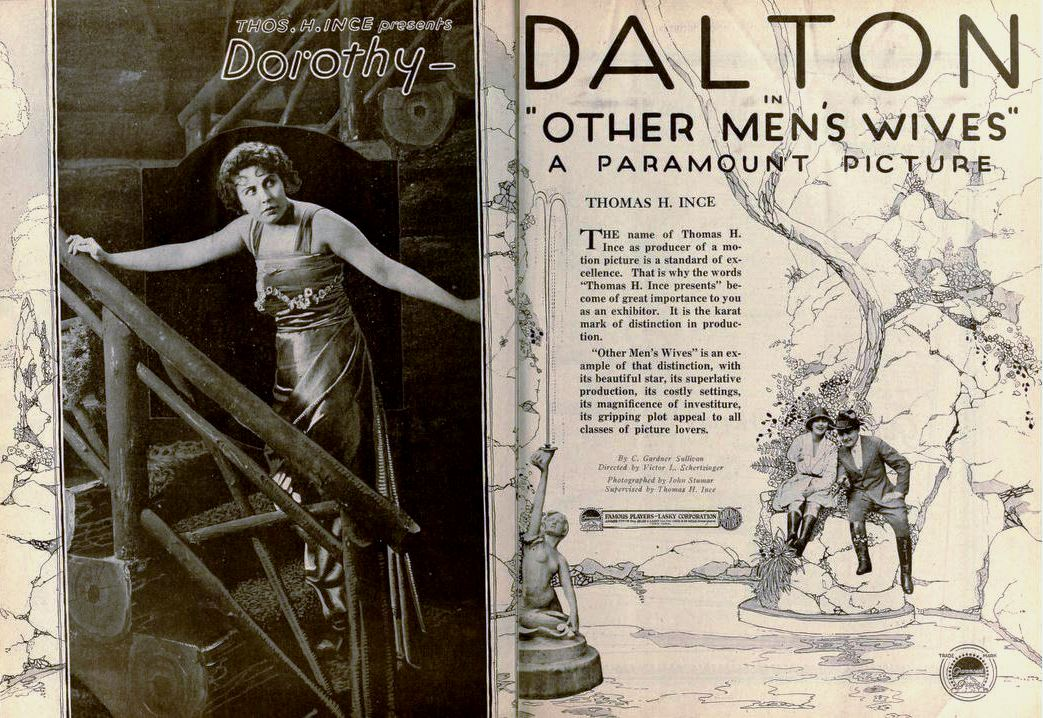
Advertisement in the 1919 Motion Picture News

As described in a film magazine, society girl Cynthia Brock is made penniless by the death of her father and about to relinquish her place in her social circle when Fenwick Flint, a wealthy bachelor, persuades her in assisting him in breaking up the happiness and marriage of James and Viola Gordon so that he may marry the lady. In her weak moment she accepts and soon has James at her feet. Then she falls in love with her victim and refuses to stage the final scene of the scheme that will provide the grounds for the divorce. The situation results in her fainting, and afterwards she tells the truth about the whole matter. James permits the divorce by his wife, and Cynthia returns Fenwick's money and goes to work. In due time she and James marry.

== Cast ==
- Dorothy Dalton as Cynthia Brock
- Forrest Stanley as James Gordon
- Holmes Herbert as Fenwick Flint
- Dell Boone as Viola Gordon
- Elsa Lorimer as Mrs. Peyton-Andrews
- Hal Clements as Mr. Peyton-Andrews
