= Guy Coombs =

American actor

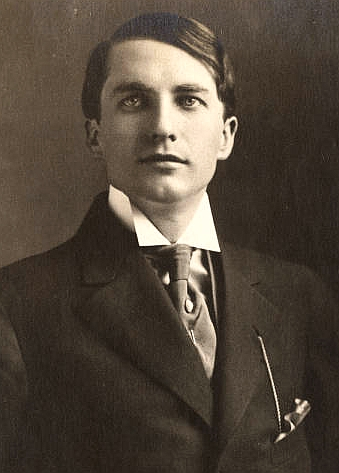
- Coombs while working for Kalem, 1912
- Born: June 15, 1882; Washington, D. C., US
- Died: December 29, 1947 (aged 65); Los Angeles, California, US
- Resting place: The Evergreens Cemetery, King's County Brooklyn, New York
- Occupation: actor
- Years active: 1908-1922
- Spouse: Anna Q. Nilsson (m. 1916; div. 1917)

Guy Coombs (June 15, 1882 – December 29, 1947) was an American stage and screen actor who had a prolific career during the silent era. He was born in Washington, D.C. and died in Los Angeles, California. He left films in 1922 to work in real-estate in Florida.

On Broadway, in 1908, Coombs appeared with the likes of James K. Hackett and Arthur Hoops in a revival of The Prisoner of Zenda.

Coombs appeared in films from Edison, Kalem, Kleine and Metro Pictures.

Coombs was married at one time to acting colleague Anna Q. Nilsson.

== Selected filmography ==
- Nell's Last Deal (1911)
- Aida (1911)
- Edna's Imprisonment (1911)
- Captain Nell (1911)
- Battle of Pottsburg Bridge (1912)
- The Drummer Girl of Vicksburg (1912)
- The Confederate Ironclad (1912)
- A Celebrated Case (1914)
- Bab's Diary (1917)
- Bab's Burglar (1917)
- The Uphill Path (1918)
- Flower of the Dusk (1920)
- The Wrong Woman (1920)
- When Knighthood Was in Flower (1922)
- That Woman (1922)
