= Mayflower Photoplay Company =

American producer

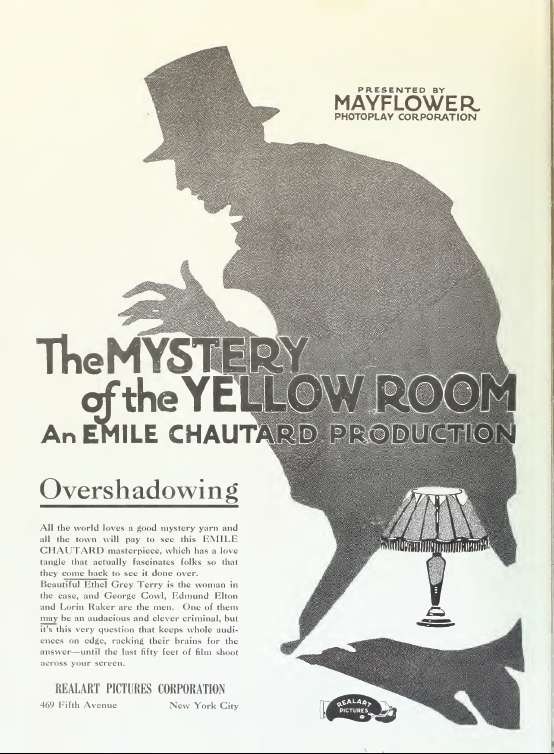
The Mystery of the Yellow Room ad from 1919

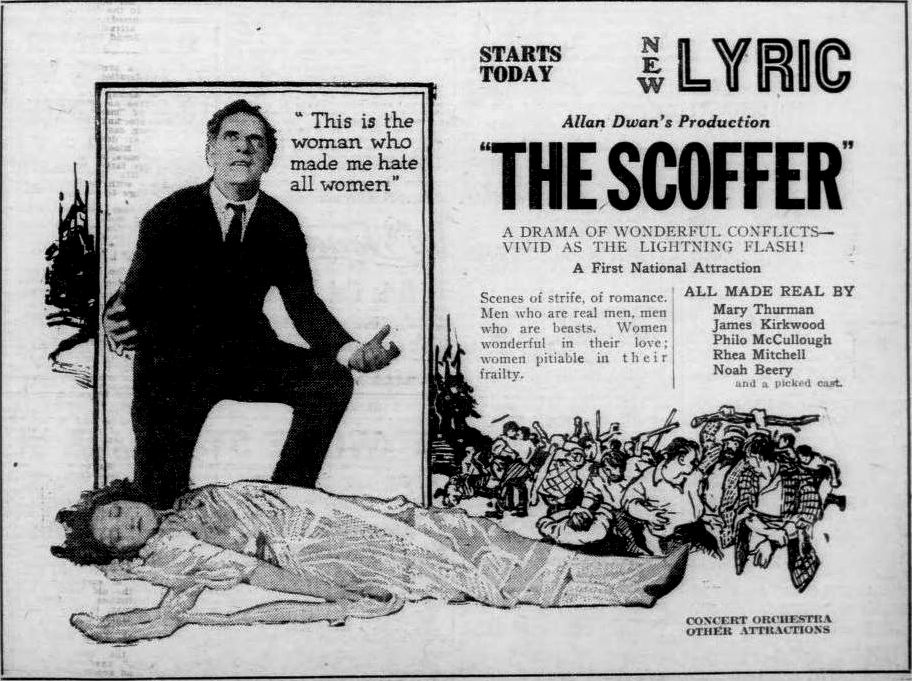
The Scoffer ad from 1920

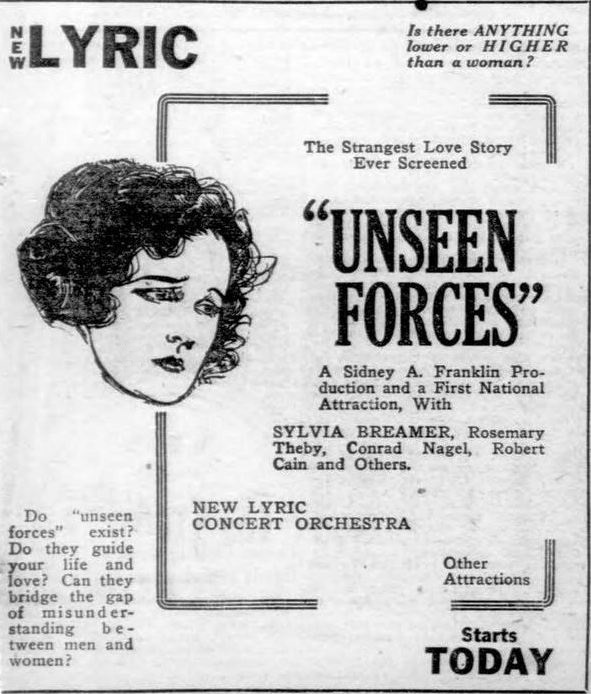
Unseen Forces ad from 1920

Mayflower Photoplay Company was a small independent company that produced a dozen films over three years, from 1919 to 1922. It was based in Boston.

The company worked with filmmakers George Loane Tucker, Allan Dwan, Émile Chautard and Raoul Walsh. Mayflower Photoplay Company made some films for Columbia Films run by Joseph P. Kennedy.

== Filmography ==
- Living Lies (1922)
- Ladies Must Live (1921)
- The Sin of Martha Queed (1921)
- The Oath (1921)(I)
- Unseen Forces (1920)
- In the Heart of a Fool (1920)
- The Law of the Yukon (1920)
- The Scoffer (1920) (An Allan Dwan Production)
- A Splendid Hazard (1920)
- The Deep Purple (1920)
- The Luck of the Irish (1920)
- Soldiers of Fortune (1919)
- The Mystery of the Yellow Room (1919)
- The Miracle Man (1919)
- Bolshevism on Trial (1919)

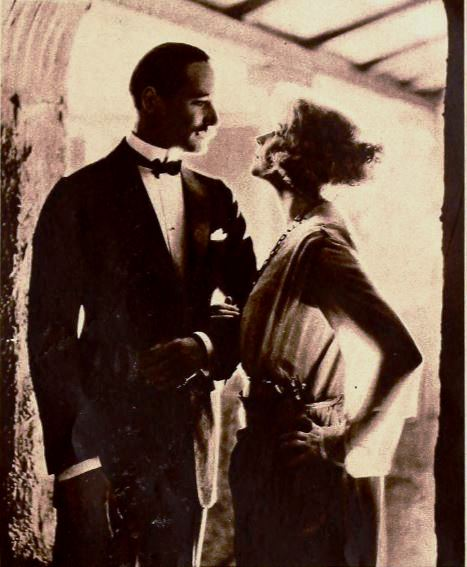
Scene from Soldiers of Fortune with Norman Kerry & Anna Q. Nilsson, from 1919

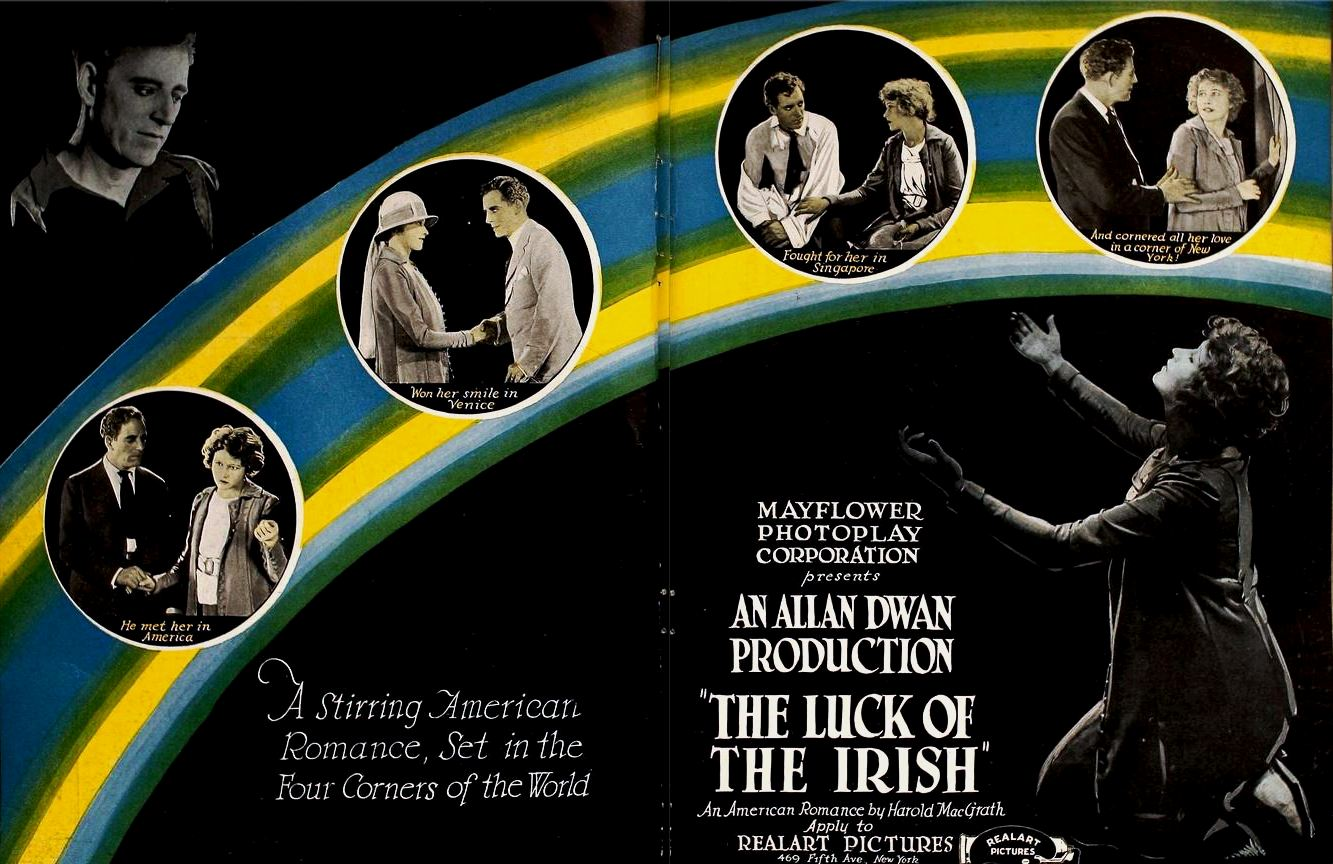
The Luck of the Irish ad from 1920
