= Anna Q. Nilsson =

Swedish-American actress (1888–1974)

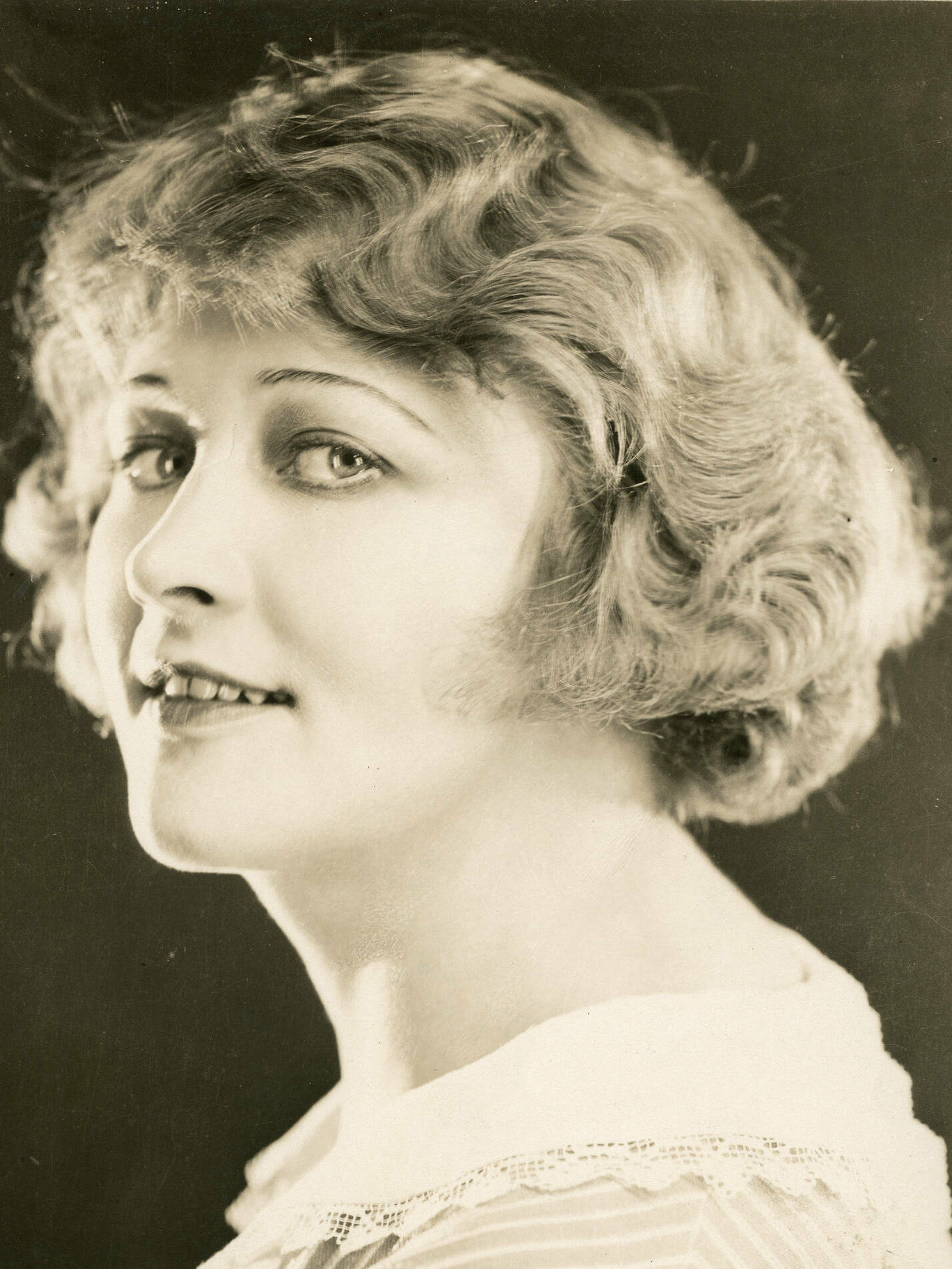
- Nilsson in 1925
- Born: Anna Quirentia Nilsson; March 30, 1888; Ystad, Sweden
- Died: February 11, 1974 (aged 85); Sun City, California, U.S.
- Occupation: Actress
- Years active: 1911–1954
- Spouses: Guy Coombs (m. 1916; div. 1917) J. Marshall Gunnerson (m. 1922; div. 1925)

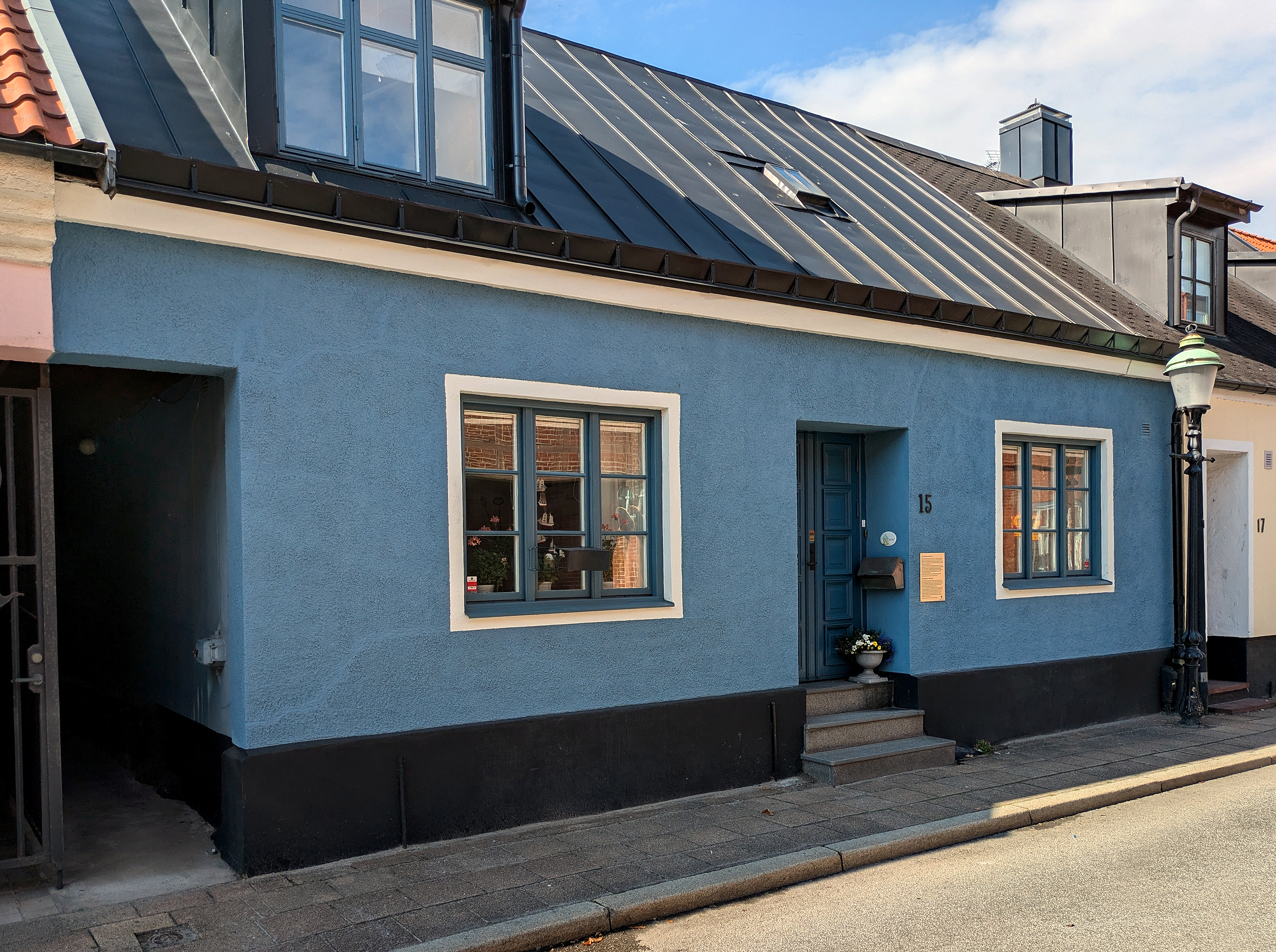
The house where Anna Q. Nilsson was born, Trädgårdsgatan (Garden Street) in central Ystad

Anna Quirentia Nilsson (March 30, 1888 – February 11, 1974) was a Swedish actress who achieved success in American silent movies.

== Early life ==
Nilsson was born in Ystad, Sweden, in 1888. Her middle name Quirentia is derived from her date of birth, March 30, Saint Quirinius' Day. When she was 8 years old her father, Per Nilsson, got a job at the local sugar factory in Hasslarp, a small community outside Helsingborg in Sweden, where she spent most of her school years. She did very well in school, graduating with the highest marks. Due to her good grades, she was hired as a sales clerk in Halmstad on the Swedish west coast, unusual for a young woman from a worker's family at the time, but she had set her mind on going to the United States.

In 1905, she immigrated to the United States through Ellis Island. In the U.S., she started working as a nursemaid and learned English quickly.

== Career ==
=== Silent films ===
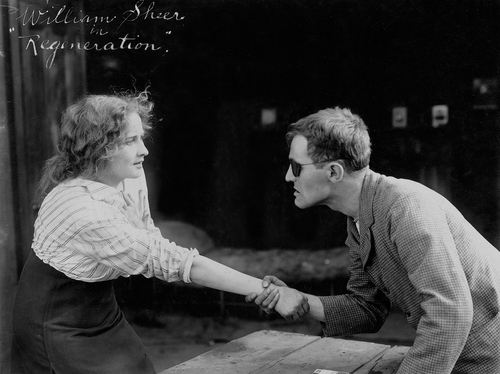
Nilsson in Raoul Walsh's film Regeneration (1915)

In 1907, Nilsson was named "Most beautiful woman in America". The cover artist Penrhyn Stanlaws chose her as one of his models, which led to her feature role in the Kalem Motion Picture Company's 1911 film Molly Pitcher.

She stayed at the Kalem studio for several years, ranked behind its top star Alice Joyce, before branching out to other production companies. Films of special note are Regeneration (1915) Seven Keys to Baldpate (1917), Soldiers of Fortune (1919), The Toll Gate and The Luck of the Irish (both 1920), and The Lotus Eater (1921). In 1921, while on a rare vacation return to Sweden, she was asked to film Värmlänningarna, her only Swedish movie.

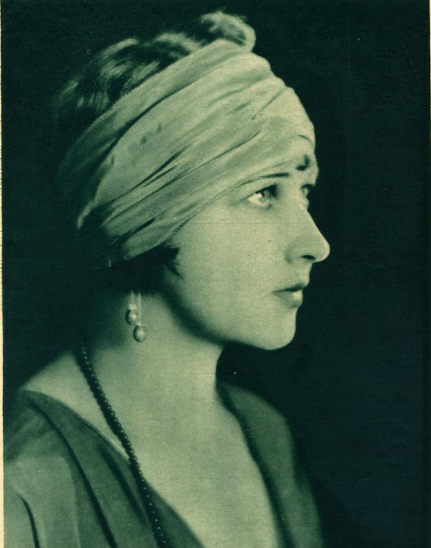
Nilsson, 1923

In the 1920s, she freelanced successfully for Paramount, First National and many other studios and reached a peak of popularity just before the advent of talkies. In 1923, she was severely burned while filming a scene in which she drove a locomotive through a forest fire for Hearts Aflame; she required a week to recuperate, but that did not impede her career. That year, she made nine movies, including portraying "Cherry Malotte" in the second movie based on Rex Beach's The Spoilers, a role that would be played in later versions by Betty Compson (1930), Marlene Dietrich (1942), and Anne Baxter (1955). In 1926, she was named Hollywood's most popular woman. She welcomed royalty when the Swedish Crown Prince Gustav Adolf (later King Gustaf VI Adolf) and his wife Louise Mountbatten visited Hollywood. In 1928, she set a record for fan mail, some 30,000 letters per month, and in that year Joseph P. Kennedy brought her to his newly formed film company RKO Radio Pictures. The following year, as she was horse riding, she fell off the horse, was thrown against a stone wall and broke her hip. After a year of hard training, she was on her feet again. In 1928, Anna Nilsson made her last film of the silent era, Blockade.

=== Sound films ===
With the introduction of sound films, Nilsson's career went into a sharp decline, although she continued to play small, often uncredited parts in films into the 1950s. Between 1930 and 1950, she participated in 39 sound films in smaller roles. She played the role of the Swedish immigrant mother of Loretta Young in The Farmer's Daughter (1947). Her best known performance in a sound film is arguably her turn as herself in Sunset Boulevard (1950), referred to as one of Norma Desmond's "waxworks", where she has one line.

Nilsson has a star on the Hollywood Walk of Fame at 6150 Hollywood Boulevard for her contribution to motion pictures. She was the first Swedish-born actress to receive such an honor.

== Personal life ==
Nilsson was married to actor Guy Coombs from 1916 until 1917 and to Norwegian-American shoe merchant John Marshall Gunnerson from 1922 until 1925. She died in Sun City, California, on February 11, 1974, of heart failure.

== Selected filmography ==
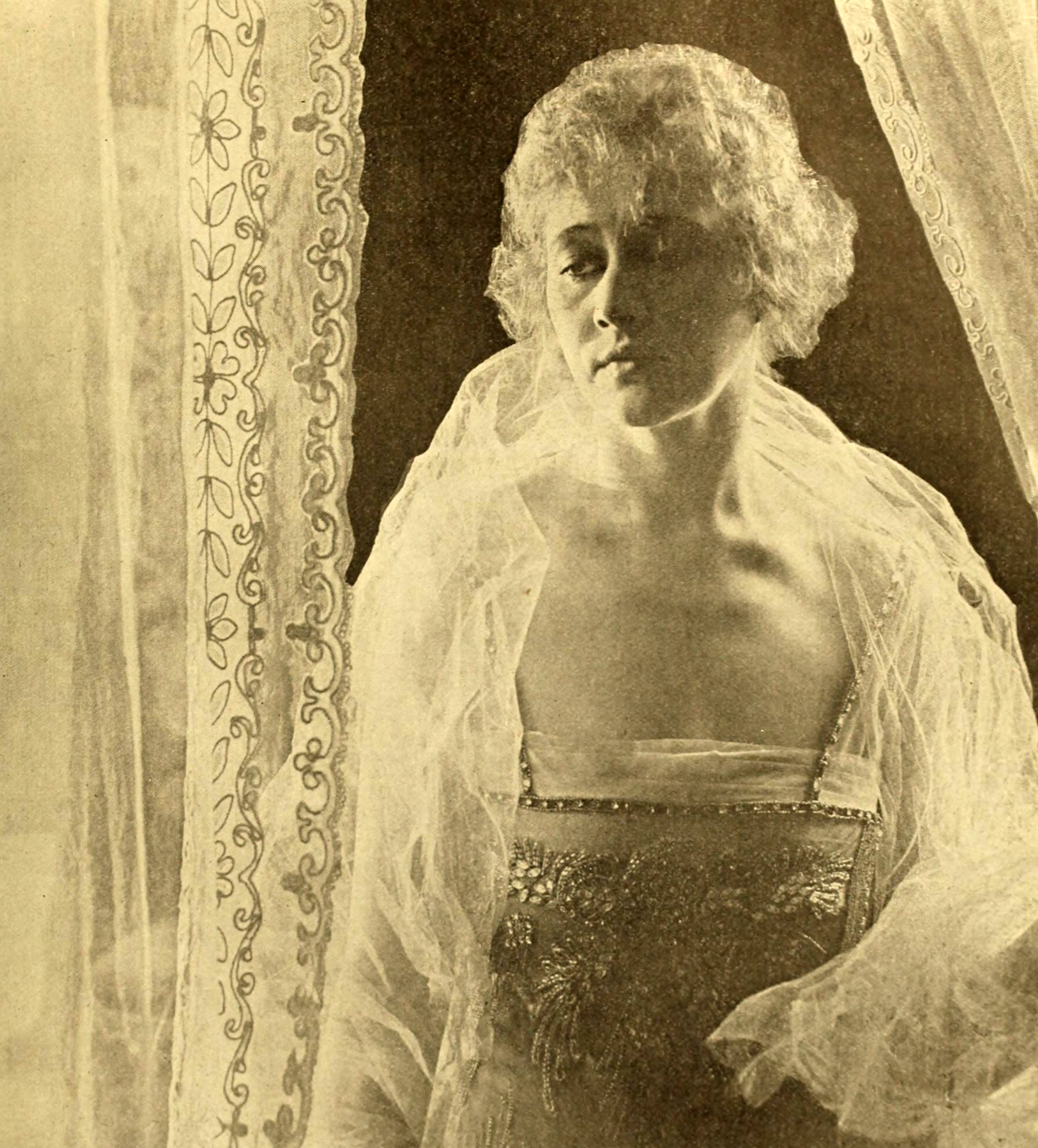
Advertisement in The Moving Picture World for the film Who's Guilty? (1916)

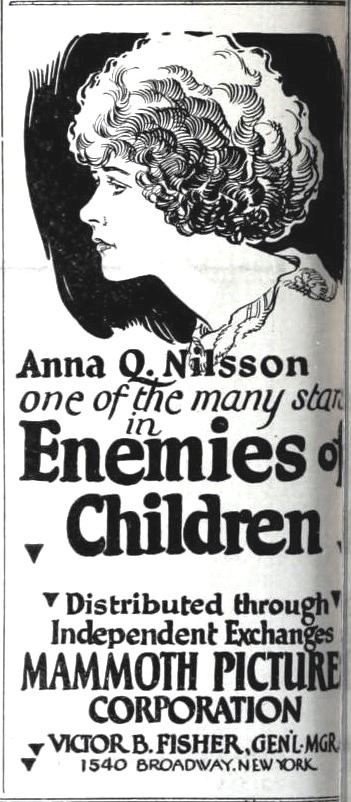
Advertisement for Enemies of Children (1923)

- The Express Envelope (1911, Short) as Hazel
- Molly Pitcher (1911, Short) as Molly Pitcher
- The Flash in the Night (1911, Short) as Kate
- The Darling of the C.S.A. (1912)
- The Drummer Girl of Vicksburg (1912) as Rose Beecher
- The Confederate Ironclad (1912, Short) as Elinor Adams - a Union Spy
- Wolfe; Or, The Conquest of Quebec (1914) as Mignon Mars
- The Hazards of Helen (1914, Serial) as Helen [Ch. 18] 'The Night Operator at Buxton'
- Regeneration (1915) as Marie Deering
- Barbara Frietchie (1915) as Sue Negly
- The Scarlet Road (1916) as Betty Belgrave
- The Supreme Sacrifice (1916) as Helen Chambers
- Her Surrender (1916) as Rhoda Cortlandt
- Infidelity (1917) as Elaine Bernard
- The Moral Code (1917) as Jean Hyland
- The Inevitable (1917) as Florence Grey
- The Silent Master (1917) as Minor Role
- Seven Keys to Baldpate (1917) as Mary Norton
- Over There (1917) as Bettie Adams
- Heart of the Sunset (1918) as Alaire Austin
- The Trail to Yesterday (1918) as Sheila Langford
- No Man's Land (1918) as Katherine Gresham
- In Judgement Of (1918) as Mary Manners
- The Vanity Pool (1918) as Carol Harper
- Ravished Armenia (1919) as Edith Graham
- Venus in the East (1919) as Mrs. Pat Dyvenot
- Cheating Cheaters (1919) as Grace Palmer
- The Way of the Strong (1919) as Audrie Hendrie / Monica Norton
- A Very Good Young Man (1919) as Viva Bacchus
- The Love Burglar (1919) as Joan Gray
- A Sporting Chance (1919) as Pamela Brent
- Her Kingdom of Dreams (1919) as Carlotta Stanmore
- Soldiers of Fortune (1919) as Alice Langham
- The Luck of the Irish (1920) as Ruth Warren
- The Thirteenth Commandment (1920) as Leila Kip
- The Toll Gate (1920) as Mary Brown
- The Figurehead (1920) as Mary Forbes
- One Hour Before Dawn (1920) as Ellen Aldrich
- The Fighting Chance (1920) as Sylvia Landis
- In the Heart of a Fool (1920) as Margaret Muller
- The Brute Master (1920) as Madeline Grey
- What Women Will Do (1921) as Lily Gibbs
- Without Limit (1921) as Ember Edwards
- The Oath (1921) as Irene Lansing
- Why Girls Leave Home (1921) as Anna Hedder
- Värmlänningarna (1921, her only Swedish film) as Anna
- The Lotus Eater (1921) as Madge Vance
- Ten Nights in a Bar Room (1921)
- Three Live Ghosts (1922) as Ivis
- The Man from Home (1922) as Genevieve Granger-Simpson
- Pink Gods (1922) as Lady Margot Cork
- Hearts Aflame (1923) as Helen Foraker
- The Isle of Lost Ships (1923) as Dorothy Fairfax
- The Rustle of Silk (1923) as Lady Feo
- The Spoilers (1923) as Cherry Malotte
- Hollywood (1923) as Anna Q. Nilsson
- Adam's Rib (1923) as Mrs. Michael Ramsay
- Ponjola (1923) as Lady Flavia Desmond
- Thundering Dawn (1923) as Mary Rogers
- Innocence (1923) as Fay Leslie
- Enemies of Children (1923)
- Half-A-Dollar-Bill (1924) as The Stranger - Mrs. Webber
- Painted People (1924) as Leslie Carter
- Flowing Gold (1924) as Allegheny Briskow
- Between Friends (1924) as Jessica Drene
- Broadway After Dark (1924) as Helen Tremaine
- The Side Show of Life (1924) as Lady Auriol Dayne
- The Fire Patrol (1924) as Mary Ferguson
- The Breath of Scandal (1924)
- Vanity's Price (1924) as Vaana Du Maurier
- Inez from Hollywood (1924) as Inez Laranetta
- Hello, 'Frisco (1924) as herself
- If I Marry Again (1925) as Alicia Wingate
- The Top of the World (1925) as Sylvia Ingleton
- One Way Street (1925) as Lady Sylvia Hutton
- The Talker (1925) as Kate Lennox
- Winds of Chance (1925) as Countess Courteau
- The Splendid Road (1925) as Sandra De Hault
- Too Much Money (1926) as Annabel Broadley
- Her Second Chance (1926) as Mrs. Constance Lee / Caroline Logan
- The Greater Glory (1926) as Fanny
- Miss Nobody (1926) as Barbara Brown
- Midnight Lovers (1926) as Diana Fothergill
- The Masked Woman (1927) as Diane Delatour
- Easy Pickings (1927) as Mary Ryan
- Babe Comes Home (1927) (with Babe Ruth) as Vernie
- Lonesome Ladies (1927) as Polly Fosdick
- The Thirteenth Juror (1927) as Helen Marsden
- Sorrell and Son (1927) as Dora Sorrell
- The Whip (1928) as Iris d'Aquila
- Blockade (1928) as Bess
- The World Changes (1933) as Mrs. Peterson
- School for Girls (1934) as Dr. Anne Galvin
- The Little Minister (1934) as Villager (uncredited)
- Wanderer of the Wasteland (1935) as Mrs. Virey
- Paradise for Three (1938) as First Bridge Player (uncredited)
- Prison Farm (1938) as Matron Ames
- The Trial of Mary Dugan (1941) as Juror (uncredited)
- The People vs. Dr. Kildare (1941) as Juror Next to Foreman (uncredited)
- They Died with Their Boots On (1941) as Mrs. Taipe (uncredited)
- Girls' Town (1942) as Mother Lorraine
- The Great Man's Lady (1942) as Paula Wales (uncredited)
- I Live on Danger (1942) as Mrs. Sherman
- Crossroads (1942) as Madame Deval (uncredited)
- Headin' for God's Country (1943) as Mrs. Nilsson
- Cry 'Havoc' (1943) as Nurse (uncredited)
- The Valley of Decision (1945) as Mrs. Scott's Nurse (uncredited)
- The Sailor Takes a Wife (1945) as Switchboard Operator (uncredited)
- The Secret Heart (1946) as Dr. Rossiger's Secretary (uncredited)
- The Farmer's Daughter (1947) as Mrs. Holstrom
- Cynthia (1947) as Miss Brady
- It Had to Be You (1947) as Saleslady (uncredited)
- Fighting Father Dunne (1948) as Mrs. Olaf Knudson
- The Boy with Green Hair (1948) as Townswoman (uncredited)
- Every Girl Should Be Married (1948) as Saleslady
- In the Good Old Summertime (1949) as Woman with Harp (uncredited)
- Adam's Rib (1949) as Mrs. Poynter (uncredited)
- Malaya (1949) as Secretary (uncredited)
- The Big Hangover (1950) as Helen Lang (uncredited)
- Sunset Boulevard (1950) as herself
- Grounds for Marriage (1951) as Dowager at Friday Club (uncredited)
- Show Boat (1951) as Seamstress (uncredited)
- The Law and the Lady (1951) as Mrs. Scholmm (uncredited)
- An American in Paris (1951) as Kay Jansen (uncredited)
- The Unknown Man (1951) as Cocktail Party Guest (uncredited)
- Fearless Fagan (1952) as Abby's Maid (uncredited)
- The Great Diamond Robbery (1954) as Nurse (uncredited)
- Seven Brides for Seven Brothers (1954) as Mrs. Elcott (uncredited)
