= The Confederate Ironclad =

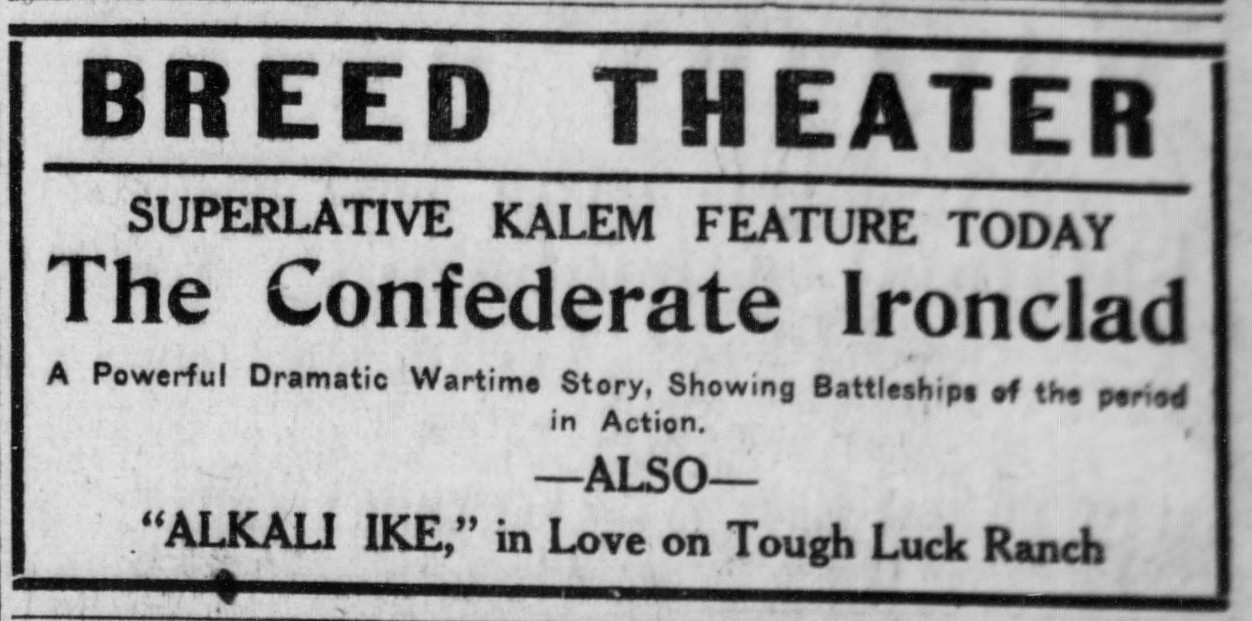
- Contemporary newspaper promotion
- Directed by: Kenean Buel (uncredited)
- Starring: Guy Coombs; Anna Q. Nilsson; Miriam Cooper
- Music by: Walter C. Simon
- Production company: Kalem Company
- Release date: 1912
- Running time: 1 reel (15-16 minutes)
- Country: United States
- Languages: Silent; English intertitles

The Confederate Ironclad is a 1912 short spy film set during the American Civil War. The "one-reeler" stars Guy Coombs, Anna Q. Nilsson and Miriam Cooper. It was released 50 years after the famous Battle of the Monitor and Merrimack between two ironclad warships.

== Plot ==
Confederate Lieutenant Yancey is asked by Mary de Lane to meet her orphan Northern niece, Elinor. Yancey later takes time off from his duties to show Elinor where a "Confederate Ironclad" is being constructed. She promptly writes a letter to the "Commanding Officer, U.S. Gunboats", revealing the location and the fact the fort guarding it is "defenseless for want of powder".

A Union force storms Yancey's artillery battery and drives off the defenders. Yancey, away chatting with Elinor, hears the shooting and rides off to warn the detachment at the fort. Upon hearing that they have no powder, he remounts his horse and races to a powder train. However, the Union soldiers are not far behind. While a firefight rages, Yancey and Rose, his girlfriend, board the train and start it up. He is shot in the arm, leaving Rose to manage things. Meanwhile, Elinor attempts to stop the train by setting fire to a railroad bridge. The rear carriage, with some barrels of powder, catches fire, so Rose detaches it before it explodes. They deliver the rest of the powder to the Confederate soldiers. A fierce battle rages between the "Confederate Ironclad" and Union gunboats. The Confederates emerge victorious; one gunboat is set afire, forcing the crew to abandon ship. Elinor offers a Union officer her horse, but he insists she come with him. However, Yancey captures the officer at gunpoint. Elinor pleads with Yancey, to no avail, until Rose persuades him to let them go.

== Cast ==
A playable digital copy of the original 35mm film preserved at the George Eastman Museum; runtime 00:15:33

- Guy Coombs as Lieutenant Yancey
- Anna Q. Nilsson as Elinor, "the northern girl spy"
- Miriam Cooper as Rose, "Lieutenant Yancey's southern sweetheart"

== Music ==
Kalem had about two dozen piano scores published in 1912–1913, to be sold to theaters for 25 cents apiece. The score for this film, composed by Walter Cleveland Simon (1884–1958), is one of the only two in the series for which the film also survives intact.
