= Pigs Is Pigs (disambiguation) =

"Pigs Is Pigs" is a story by American writer Elis Parker Butler, first published in 1905.

Pigs Is Pigs may also refer to:

- Pigs Is Pigs (1910 film), a silent film short
- Pigs Is Pigs (1937 film), a Warner Bros. Merrie Melodies cartoon
- Pigs Is Pigs (1954 film), a Walt Disney Studios cartoon, based on Butler's story
- Pigs Is Pigs, a 1914 short directed by George D. Baker and starring John Bunny
