= Gubb =

Gubb may refer to:

- Gubb (application), a Web-based list application that requires no downloaded software
- Thomas Gubb (1908–1978), a South African businessman and an early twentieth century rugby union footballer
- Philo Gubb, a character created by prolific pulp fiction writer Ellis Parker Butler
- Charlie Gubb (born 1990), a New Zealand rugby league footballer
