= The Rajah (1911 film) =

- Directed by: J. Searle Dawley
- Based on: 1883 play The Rajah by William Young
- Produced by: Edison Manufacturing Company
- Starring: Marc McDermott; Miriam Nesbitt; Laura Sawyer
- Distributed by: General Film Company
- Release date: February 14, 1911
- Running time: short 1 reel
- Country: USA

The Rajah is a 1911 silent short film directed by J. Searle Dawley and starring Marc McDermott, Miriam Nesbitt and Laura Sawyer. Distributed through the General Film Company.

== Cast ==
- Marc McDermott
- Miriam Nesbitt
- Laura Sawyer
