= An Island Comedy =

- Directed by: Ashley Miller
- Produced by: Edison Manufacturing Company
- Starring: Marc McDermott; Miriam Nesbitt
- Distributed by: General Film Company
- Release date: October 27, 1911
- Running time: 1 reel
- Country: United States
- Language: Silent..English titles

An Island Comedy is a 1911 silent film short comedy directed by Ashley Miller. It starred Marc McDermott and Miriam Nesbitt. It was produced by the Edison Company and distributed through General Film Company.

== Cast ==
- Marc McDermott - Mr. Schuyler
- Miriam Nesbitt - Miriam
- William Wadsworth - Miriam's Father
- Yale Boss - Miriam's Little Brother
