= Monsieur (disambiguation) =

Monsieur is an honorific title.

Monsieur may also refer to:

- Monsieur (novel), a novel by Lawrence Durrell
- "Monsieur", song from Luxembourg in the Eurovision Song Contest 1989
- Monsieur, a 1962 song by Petula Clark
- Monsieur (1911 film), a silent short romantic drama film
- Monsieur (1964 film), a comedy film
- Monsieur (1990 film), a film directed by Jean-Philippe Toussaint
- Monsieur Chouchani, an anonymous rabbi
