= Miriam Nesbitt =

American actress

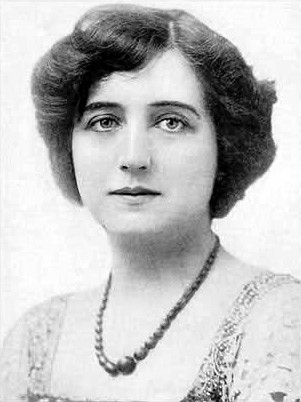
Publicity photo of Miriam Nesbitt from Stars of the Photoplay, 1916

Miriam Nesbitt (September 14, 1873, in Chicago – August 11, 1954, in Hollywood) was an American stage and film actress.

== Biography ==
Born Miriam Skanke, she studied at the Stanhope-Wheatcroft Dramatic School, before landing a part in Daniel Frohman's play The Tree of Knowledge under the stage name Miriam Nesbitt. She went on to perform on Broadway a number of times in the first decade of the twentieth century. In 1904, she originated the role of Tiger Lily in a stage production of J M Barrie's Peter Pan, or the Boy Who Wouldn't Grow Up. On April 20, 1916, she married her frequent Edison Studios co-star Marc McDermott.

She also acted in over 120 silent films, beginning in 1908 with Saved by Love. Fellow actor Marc McDermott appeared with her in many of these productions, among them Aida (1911), based on Verdi's opera with Mary Fuller and Marc McDermott, The Declaration of Independence (1911), in which she played Mrs. John Adams to McDermott's Thomas Jefferson; The Three Musketeers: Part 1 and Part 2 (1911), where she portrayed the Queen to his Cardinal Richelieu; the 1913 serial Who Will Marry Mary?; and The Man Who Disappeared, a 1914 serial. She retired in 1917; her last film, Builders of Castles, also starred her husband.

== Filmography ==
=== Long-form (45 minutes or longer) ===
- An Old Sweetheart of Mine (1911)
- The Pines of Lorey (1914)
- A Woman's Revenge (1915)
- The Glory of Clementina (1915)
- The Way Back (1915)
- The Catspaw (1916)
- Builders of Castles (1917)
- Infidelity (1917)
- The Last Sentence (1917)

=== Serials ===
- What Happened to Mary? (1912, the first serial made in the United States – 12 episodes)
- The Active Life of Dolly of the Dailies (1914 – 12 episodes)
- The Man Who Disappeared (1914 – 10 episodes)

=== Shorts ===
- Saved by Love (1908)
- Pigs Is Pigs (1910)
- The Rajah (1911)
- Monsieur (1911)
- How Spriggins Took Lodgers (1911)
- Turned to the Wall (1911)
- The Child and the Tramp (1911)
- Edna's Imprisonment (1911)
- Captain Nell (1911)
- Hearts and Flags (1911)
- The Niece and the Chorus Lady (1911)
- A Lesson Learned (1911)
- His Misjudgment (1911)
- The Price of a Man (1911)
- The Minute Man (1911)
- The New Church Carpet (1911)
- Bob and Rowdy (1911)
- The Unfinished Letter (1911)
- Friday the 13th (1911)
- The Winds of Fate (1911)
- Captain Barnacle's Baby (1911)
- The Question Mark (1911)
- Then You'll Remember Me (1911)
- Betty's Buttons (1911)
- The Declaration of Independence (1911)
- The Three Musketeers: Part 1 (1911)
- The Three Musketeers: Part 2 (1911)
- Mary's Masquerade (1911)
- How Mrs. Murray Saved the American Army (1911)
- An Island Comedy (1911)
- The Reform Candidate (1911)
- The Girl and the Motor Boat (1911)
- The Ghost's Warning (1911)
- The Story of the Indian Ledge (1911)
- Home (1911)
- A Man for All That (1911)
- The Awakening of John Bond (1911)
- Eleanore Cuyler (1912)
- Jack, the Giant Killer (1912)
- The Little Organist (1912)
- The Jewels (1912)
- Mother and Daughters (1912)
- The Corsican Brothers (1912)
- Children Who Labor (1912)
- My Double and How He Undid Me (1912)
- The Heir Apparent (1912)
- Her Face (1912)
- The Boss of Lumber Camp Number Four (1912)
- The Guilty Party (1912)
- The Bank President's Son (1912)
- A Romance of the Ice Fields (1912)
- The Artist and the Brain Specialist (1912)
- The Sunset Gun (1912)
- Jim's Wife (1912)
- The High Cost of Living (1912)
- Martin Chuzzlewit (1912)
- A Man in the Making (1912)
- The Passer-By (1912)
- The Close of the American Revolution (1912)
- Nerves and the Man (1912)
- The Little Artist of the Market (1912)
- The Lord and the Peasant (1912)
- Helping John (1912)
- The Boy and the Girl (1912)
- The Foundling (1912)
- A Suffragette in Spite of Himself (1912)
- A Letter to the Princess (1912)
- The New Squire (1912)
- Fog (1912)
- Lady Clare (1912)
- A Clue to Her Parentage (1912)
- He Swore Off Smoking (1912)
- The Coast Guard's Sister (1913)
- The Pied Piper of Hamelin (1913)
- Flood Tide (1913)
- Keepers of the Flock (1913)
- The Desperate Condition of Mr. Boggs (1913)
- The Stroke of the Phoebus Eight (1913)
- A Daughter of Romany (1913)
- The Foreman's Treachery (1913)
- The Doctor's Duty (1913)
- The Stolen Plans (1913)
- The Antique Brooch (1914)
- Stanton's Last Fling (1914)
- The Necklace of Rameses (1914)
- Sophia's Imaginary Visitors (1914)
- The Drama of Heyville (1914)
- The Price of the Necklace (1914)
- The Black Mask (1914)
- A Question of Hats and Gowns (1914)
- A Hunted Animal (1914)
- When East Met West in Boston (1914)
- The Double Cross (1914)
- The Coward and the Man (1914)
- The Light on the Wall (1914)
- With His Hands (1914)
- The Tango in Tuckerville (1914)
- The Gap (1914)
- Face to Face (1914)
- A Matter of Minutes (1914)
- The Living Dead (1914)
- The Adventures of the Pickpocket (1914)
- By the Aid of a Film (1914)
- The Long Way (1914)
- On the Isle of Sarne (1914)
- The King's Move in the City (1914)
- The Colonel of the Red Hussars (1914)
- The Premature Compromise (1914)
- Lena (1915)
- Oh! Where Is My Wandering Boy Tonight (1915)
- The Portrait in the Attic (1915)
- The Master Mummer (1915)
- A Theft in the Dark (1915)
- Killed Against Orders (1915)
- Her Proper Place (1915)
- Sally Castleton, Southerner (1915)
- Was It Her Duty? (1915)
- Life's Pitfalls (1915)
