= How Spriggins Took Lodgers =

1911 silent short film

- Produced by: Edison Manufacturing Company
- Starring: J. Sedley Brown; Marc McDermott; Miriam Nesbitt
- Distributed by: General Film Company
- Release date: April 19, 1911
- Running time: 1 reel
- Country: United States
- Language: Silent..English titles

How Spriggins Took Lodgers is a 1911 silent film short produced by the Edison Manufacturing Company. It starred J. Sedley Brown, Marc McDermott and Miriam Nesbitt. Released through the General Film Company.

== Cast ==
- J. Sedley Brown - Spriggins
- Marc McDermott - The Major
- Miriam Nesbitt - The Major's Wife
- Carrie Clark Ward - Anna Maria, the kitchen maid(*as Mrs. Sedley Brown)
- Edward Boulden - The Frenchman
