= Frances Harmer =

English-born writer

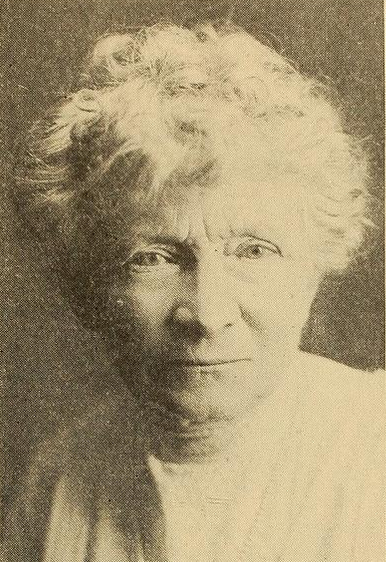
Frances Harmer, from a 1922 publication.

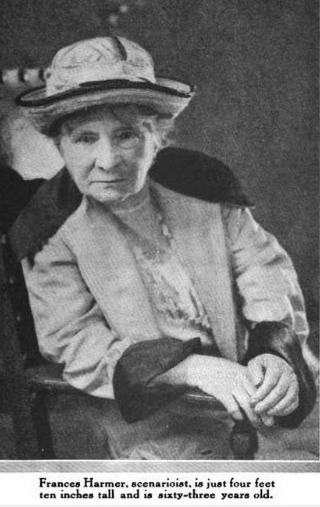
Frances Harmer, from a 1921 publication.

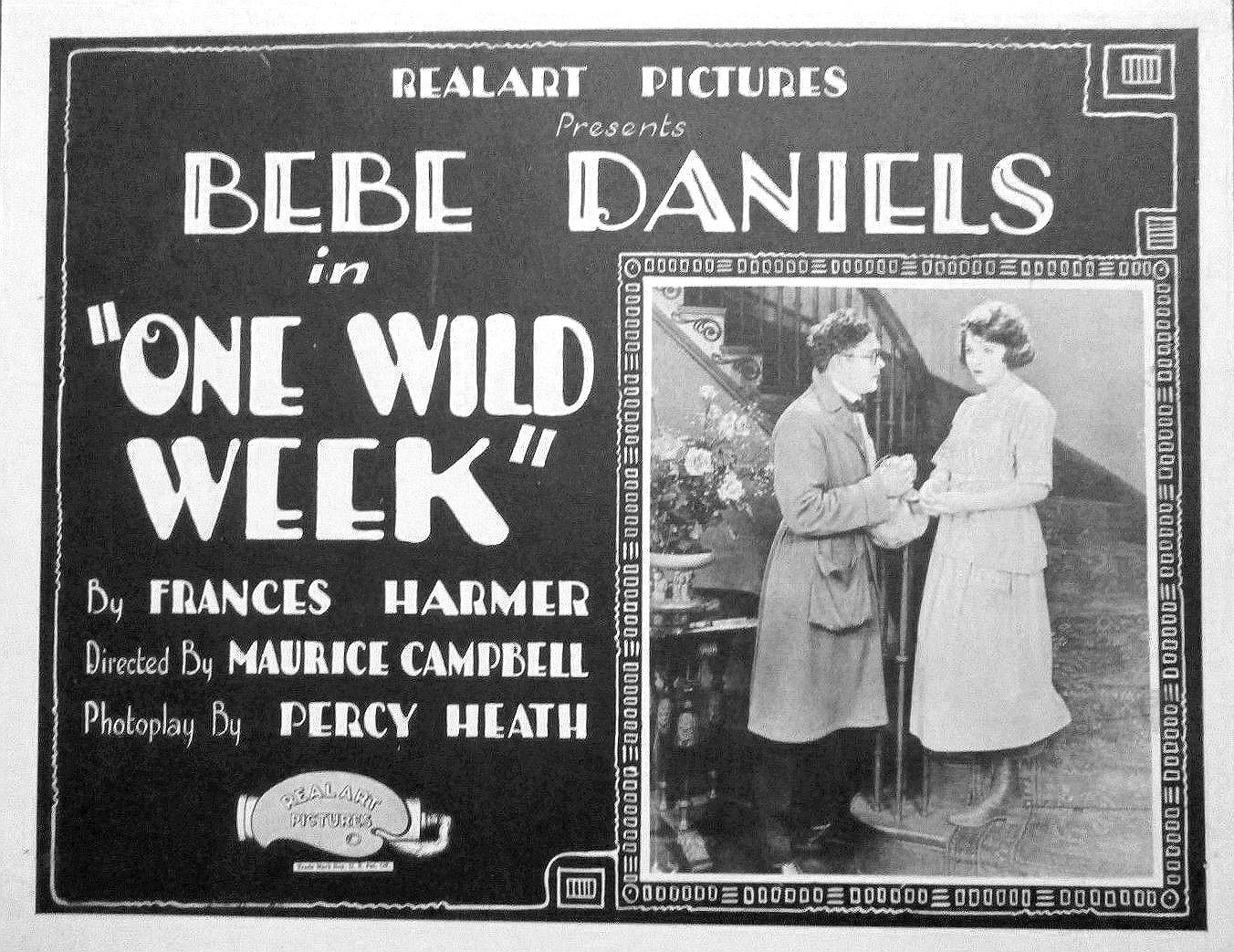
One Wild Week lobby card, crediting Frances Harmer

Frances Harmer (1858 – January 1927) was an English-born writer of short stories and a screenwriter in Hollywood, known as the "Little Mother of the Movies".

== Early life ==
Frances A. Harmer was born in England. She moved to the United States as a young woman, and worked as a teacher.

== Writing ==
Harmer lived in New York City, and then in Los Angeles, California. She wrote under several pseudonyms. Published short stories by Harmer included "The Cheat" (1907), "Losing to Win" (1908), "Counting Love's Toll" (1908), "When Love is Lord", "A Newport Nobody", "The Test", "The Wooing of Sheilah", "Hidden Gold" (1910), "The Helping Hand" (1913), "Both Fair and Good" (1913), "The Lame Boy's Gift" (1914), "The Transient" (1914), "The Gift of Speech" (1914), "The Painting of Perdita" (1915), "A Pair of Pink Shoes" (1915), "While His Mother Was Away" (1916), "The Girl He Left Behind Him" (serialized, 1917), "The Honorable Roy Carteret" (1917), "Managing Miriam" (1917), "The Portrait" (1917), "Peggy Steals a Week" (1917), "The Mentor and the Maid" (1918), "The Backward Path" (1918), and "Pretty Plaything" (1922). A story by Harmer was the basis for the Bebe Daniels film One Wild Week (1921, now lost).

== Hollywood ==
Harmer was called "Little Mother of the Movies". She worked at the Famous Players–Lasky studio as head of the reading department, evaluating scripts. Later she was "literary assistant" to William C. de Mille, and adapted stories for the screen. She was described as "a little white-haired old lady, simply dressed in gray" in 1921. She described the challenges of reading scripts in the silent era in a 1922 essay: "Too few writers, whose laurels are yet to be won, are able to visualize – to look at a blank wall and see thereon the figures of their characters in Moving Action." Elsewhere, she also discussed the problem of hopeful screenwriters attaching their names to existing well-known theatrical scripts, saying "People seem to think we moving picture people have never read, seen, nor heard anything."

In 1922 she wrote an open letter in the aftermath of William Desmond Taylor's murder, insisting that "Hollywood is not a hotbed of iniquity or a 'Sodom and Gomorrah,' nor at all worse than any other city."

== Personal life ==
Frances Harmer retired in 1924, and died in 1927, aged 68 years (though her age was frequently exaggerated in newspapers), in New York City.
