= One Wild Week =

1921 film

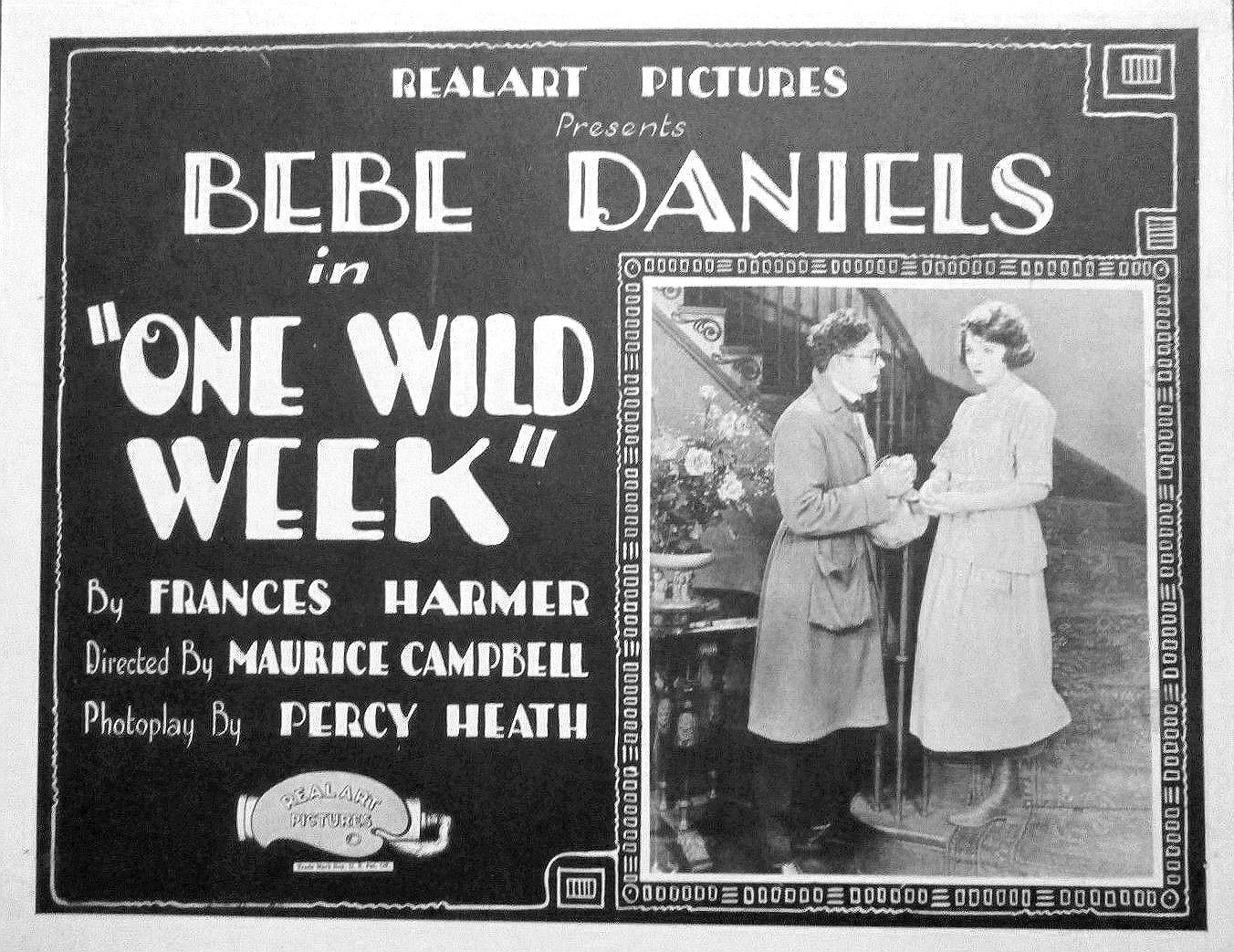
- Lobby card
- Directed by: Maurice Campbell
- Written by: Frances Harmer (story); Percy Heath (scenario)
- Starring: Bebe Daniels
- Cinematography: H. Kinley Martin
- Production company: Realart Pictures Corporation
- Distributed by: Realart Pictures Corporation
- Release date: August 1921
- Running time: 5-6 reels
- Country: United States
- Language: Silent (English intertitles)

One Wild Week is a 1921 American silent comedy romance film directed by Maurice Campbell and starring Bebe Daniels. Adolph Zukor produced the film through his Realart Pictures Corporation.

== Plot ==
As described in a film magazine, Pauline Hathaway attains her eighteenth birthday was the ward of a spinster aunt and learns that she is heir to a small fortune provided she keeps her name out of the newspapers for a period of six months. She goes to visit an old friend of her mother and is falsely arrested for theft. After giving a fictitious name, she is sent to the woman's reformatory. She escapes with three other inmates and makes her way to the home of her hostess followed by her aunt and others who have become involved in the search for her. The film ends with satisfactory explanations being made.

== Cast ==
- Bebe Daniels as Pauline Hathaway
- Frank Kingsley as Bruce Reynolds
- Mayme Kelso as Emma Jessop
- Frances Raymond as Mrs. Brewster
- Herbert Standing as Judge Bancroft
- Edwin Stevens as Oliver Tobin
- Edythe Chapman as Mrs. Dorn
- Carrie Clark Ward as Cook
- Bull Montana as Red Mike

== Preservation ==
One Wild Week is currently presumed lost. In February of 2021, the film was cited by the National Film Preservation Board on their Lost U.S. Silent Feature Films list.
