= Builders of Castles =

- Directed by: Ben Turbett
- Written by: Herbert Albert Phillips
- Starring: Marc McDermott; Miriam Nesbitt
- Production company: Edison Manufacturing Company
- Distributed by: K-E-S-E
- Release date: April 16, 1917
- Running time: 5 reels
- Country: United States
- Language: Silent. English titles.

Builders of Castles is a 1917 American silent drama film directed by Ben Turbett. It starred Marc McDermott and Miriam Nesbitt, a real-life husband and wife team. It was produced by the Edison Manufacturing Company.

== Cast ==
- Marc McDermott - Gittens
- Miriam Nesbitt - Marie
- William Wadsworth - Morton
- Robert Brower - The Builder
- Edward G. Longman - Reverend James Filikens
- Jessie Stevens - Mrs. Maguire
- Florence Stover - Fannie
- Nellie Grant - Mrs. Morton
- Simon P. Gillies - James Regan
- Frank Trainor - Postman
- Mabel Dwight - Marie's Landlady

== Censorship ==
Before Builders of Castles could be exhibited in Kansas, the Kansas Board of Review required the removal of the scene where the housekeeper is leering at Gittens, and the use of knock-out drops on Marie.

== Preservation status ==
- This film is preserved in the George Eastman House collection.
