= Ethel Browning (actress) =

American actress and screenwriter

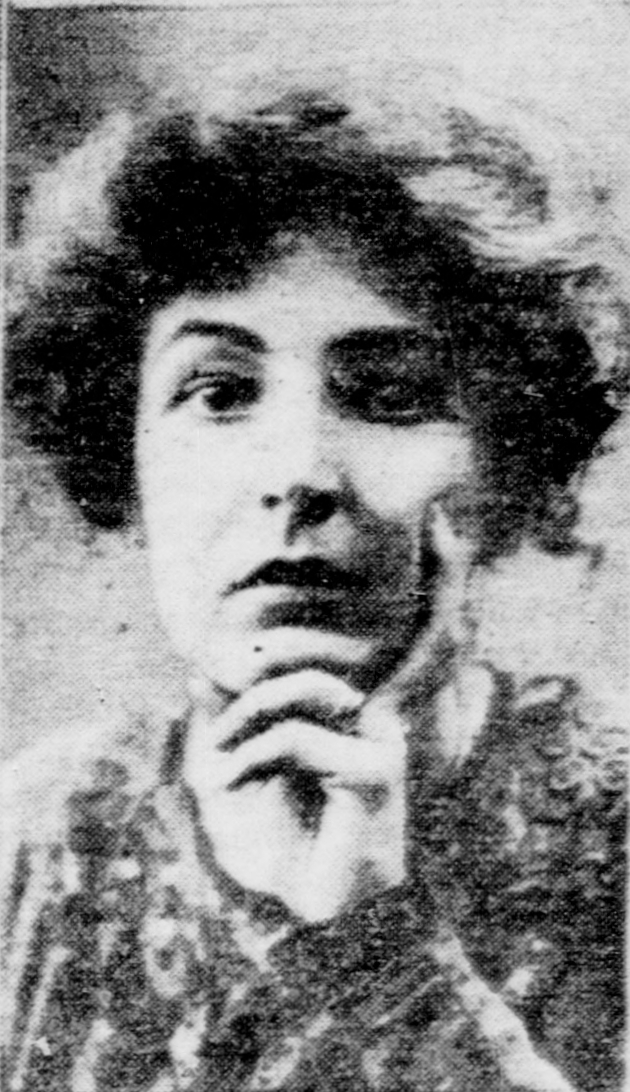
- Browning in Love's Understudy (1910)
- Born: Ethel Bull; April 17, 1877; Indianapolis, Indiana, U.S.
- Died: September 22, 1965 (aged 88); Paramus, New Jersey, U.S.
- Occupation(s): Actress, screenwriter
- Years active: 1892–1965
- Spouse: Ashley Miller (m. 1889; died 1949)

Ethel Browning (born Ethel Bull; April 17, 1877 – September 22, 1965) was an American actress and screenwriter.

== Early years ==
The daughter of Mr. and Mrs. W. C. Bull, Browning was born in Indianapolis and lived on the South Side of St. Louis, Missouri, until she debuted on stage, after which her family moved to Dayton, Ohio.

== Career ==
Browning debuted on stage in a production of Ye Olden Trouble (1892) in Trenton, New Jersey. After being a child actress with a Broadway acting company headed by Joseph Jefferson, Browning matured to ingenue roles with Nat Goodwin's troupe, including traveling with that group on an Australian tour.

In 1898, Browning acted with the Park Theater Stock Company until a disagreement arose between her and Leonard Grover, the theater's manager. Her husband attempted to take over a role for which he had been rejected, which led to both husband and wife resigning from the company. She sought a warrant in court after Grover offered $58 in settlement pay, far short of the $350 that Browning considered was due them. The magistrate did not issue a warrant, however. A week later, Grover went to court seeking damages from Browning for breach of contract.

Browning's Broadway credits included Meyer & Son (1909) and Marta of the Lowlands (1903 and 1908). Her final appearance on stage came in 1947 in a production of The Gentleman from Athens.

Browning also worked behind the scenes with films. As a screenwriter, she adapted Mabel Wagnalls' short story A Rose Bush of a Thousand Years for filming in addition to arranging the contract for sale of screen rights to the short story and her screenplay. She also adapted works by Florence Morse Kingsley, Leslie Moore, and Meredith Nicholson for filming.

== Personal life and death ==
Browning was married to Ashley Miller, an actor and director of silent films, from 1899 until his death in 1949.

On September 22, 1965, Browning died at Pine Rest Nursing Home in Paramus, New Jersey, at age 88.
