= The Golden Cocoon =

1925 film

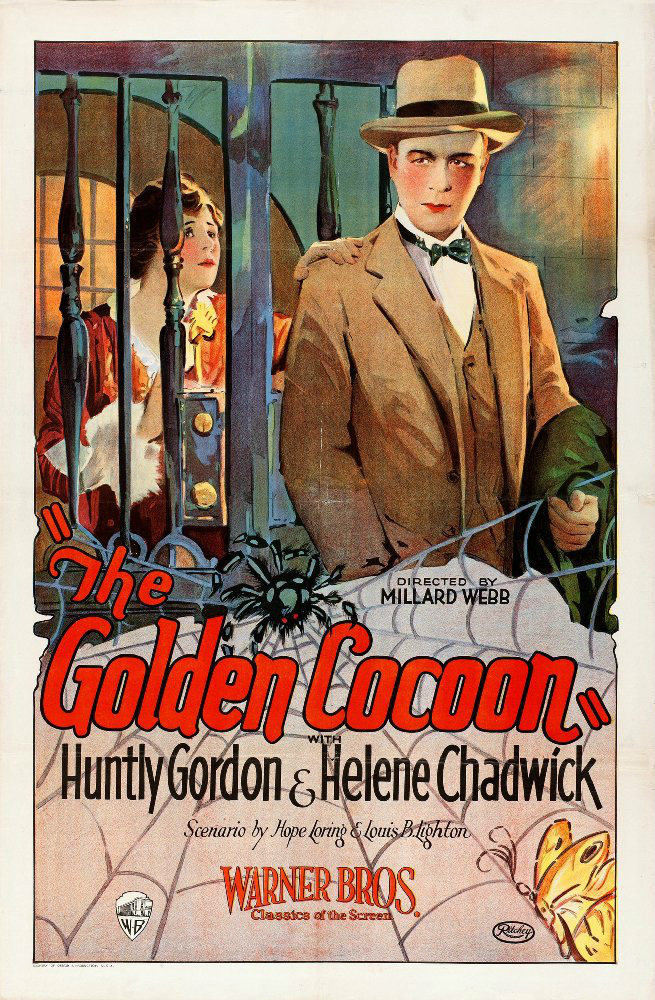
- Theatrical release poster
- Directed by: Millard Webb
- Screenplay by: Louis D. Lighton; Hope Loring
- Based on: The Golden Cocoon by Ruth Cross
- Starring: Huntley Gordon; Helene Chadwick; Richard Tucker; Frank Campeau; Margaret Seddon; Carrie Clark Ward
- Cinematography: Byron Haskin
- Production company: Warner Bros.
- Distributed by: Warner Bros.
- Release dates: December 14, 1925 (New York); January 30, 1926 (United States)
- Running time: 70 minutes
- Country: United States
- Language: Silent (English intertitles)

The Golden Cocoon is a 1925 American silent drama film directed by Millard Webb and written by Louis D. Lighton, and Hope Loring. It is based on the 1924 novel The Golden Cocoon by Ruth Cross. The film stars Huntley Gordon, Helene Chadwick, Richard Tucker, Frank Campeau, Margaret Seddon, and Carrie Clark Ward. The film was released by Warner Bros. on January 30, 1926.

== Plot ==
As described in a review in a film magazine, Molly Shannon, an innocent country girl who wins a university scholarship offered by Gregory Cochran, a wealthy judge. She falls in love with one of the professors, Mr. Renfro, who jilts her on the eve of their wedding. Aimlessly she wanders about and faints in front of a roadhouse with an evil reputation, and is taken in and revived. As she emerges she is seen by Bancroft, a grafting politician who later seeks to use this knowledge to force from the race the judge whom she has since married. The wife disappears, feigning suicide, which is her clever ruse to keep her story out of the paper (at the time, ethic standards at most newspapers prevented publication of any slander against a dead person). Molly is found by Professor Renfro just before the election. He goes to the governor and the wife follows. In a struggle the professor is shot and exonerates the wife, who keeps her secret, saving her husband's career.

== Cast ==
- Huntley Gordon as Gregory Cochran the
- Helene Chadwick as Molly Shannonthe
- Richard Tucker as Mr. Renfro
- Frank Campeau as Mr. Bancroft
- Margaret Seddon as Mrs. Shannon
- Carrie Clark Ward as Mrs. Parker
- Charles McHugh as Mr. Shannon
- Violet Kane as Little Girl
- Carmencita Johnson as Baby (uncredited)
- Vondell Darr as Young Girl (uncredited)
- Seessel Anne Johnson as Young Girl (uncredited)
