= The Adventure of the Wrong Santa Claus =

- Directed by: Charles M. Seay (uncredited)
- Story by: Frederic Arnold Kummer
- Starring: Barry O'Moore; Julian Reed; Richard Neill; Bliss Milford; Kenneth Lawlor
- Production company: Thomas A. Edison, Inc.
- Distributed by: General Film Company (1914); Killiam Shows (2004)
- Release date: 1914
- Running time: 14 minutes
- Country: United States
- Language: Silent

The Adventure of the Wrong Santa Claus is a 1914 silent Christmas film.

== Storyline ==
A burglar in a Santa suit steals a family's Christmas presents. Amateur detective Octavius decides to catch him and recover the stolen things.

== Cast ==
- Barry O'Moore - Octavius, the Amateur Detective
- Julian Reed - Ignatz - the Butler
- Richard Neill - Mr. Randall
- Bliss Milford - Mrs. Bertha Randall
- Kenneth Lawlor - Dick
- Kathleen Coughlin - Mamie
- Edith Peters - Kate
- John Sturgeon - The Wrong Santa Claus (burglar)

== See also ==
- List of Christmas films

== Sources ==
- The Adventure of the Wrong Santa Claus (1914) on Internet Movie Database
