= Ben Turbett =

American actor

Ben Turbett (1874 – March 6, 1936) was an opera performer, actor, and film director in the United States.

He was born in Salem, Massachusetts and performed in operas as a young man. In 1909 he appeared in the Broadway production Stubborn Cinderella.

== Filmography ==
=== Actor ===
- The Blue Coyote Cherry Crop d'Ashley Miller (1914)
- The Working of a Miracle d'Ashley Miller (1915)
- The Corporal's Daughter de Will Louis (1915)
- The Broken Word de Frank McGlynn Sr. (1915)

=== Director ===
- The Voice of the Violin (1915)
- When Love Is King (1916)
- The Last Sentence (1917)
- The Royal Pauper (1917)
- Builders of Castles (1917)
- The Half back (1917)
- Gallegher (1917)
- Cy Whittaker's Ward (1917)
- The Courage of the Commonplace (1917)
- The Lady of the Photograph (1917)
- The Courage of the Common Place (1917)
