= Under Southern Skies (1915 film) =

1915 film by Lucius J. Henderson

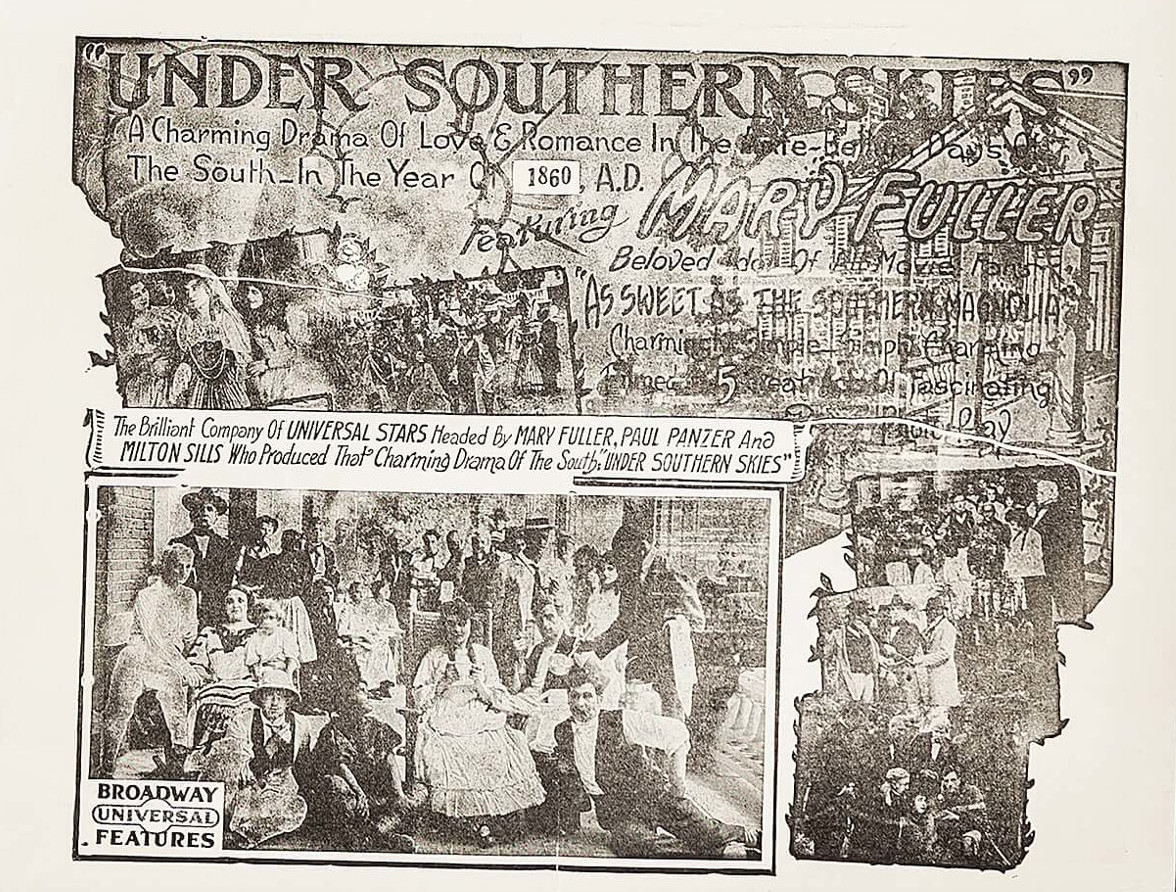
- Promotional poster
- Directed by: Lucius Henderson
- Written by: William Addison Lathrop
- Based on: play Under Southern Skies by Charlotte Blair Parker
- Produced by: Carl Laemmle
- Starring: Mary Fuller
- Distributed by: Universal Film Manufacturing Company
- Release date: September 20, 1915
- Running time: 5 reels
- Country: USA
- Language: Silent...English titles

Under Southern Skies is a lost 1915 American silent film drama directed by Lucius Henderson and starring Mary Fuller. It was produced and released by the Universal Film Manufacturing Company.

== Cast ==
- Mary Fuller - Lelia Crofton
- Charles Stanton Ogle - Major Crofton
- Clara Beyers - Stella Crofton (*as Clara Byers)
- A. H. Busby - Colonel Mavor (*as Bert Bushy)
- Milton Sills - Burleigh Mavor
- William Heidloff - Ambrose Mavor
- Jack Ridgeway - Colonel Daubeney (*as John Ridgway)
- Paul Panzer - Steve Daubeney
- Marie Shotwell - Mrs. Hampton
- Mary Moore - Fifi Hampton
- Harry Blakemore - Uncle Joshuaway
- Nellie Slattery - Aunt Doshey
- Margaret Wall - Anner Lizer
- Marie Weirman - Phinney

== See also ==
- List of films and television shows about the American Civil War
