= Saved by Love (film) =

- Directed by: Edwin S. Porter
- Produced by: Edison Manufacturing Company
- Starring: Florence Turner; Miriam Nesbitt
- Distributed by: Edison Manufacturing Company
- Release date: November 3, 1908
- Running time: short; 1 reel
- Country: USA
- Language: Silent..English

Saved by Love is a 1908 silent film short directed by Edwin S. Porter and produced by the Edison Manufacturing Company. It featured the screen debut of actress Miriam Nesbitt.

This is one of the films of the Edison company that "had plots so simple-minded they could be encapsulated in the film’s title" according to David Nasaw.

== Cast ==
- Florence Turner
- Pat O'Malley
- Walter Edwin
- Miriam Nesbitt
