= Who Will Marry Mary? =

1913 film

- Starring: Mary Fuller; Ben F. Wilson
- Distributed by: General Film Company
- Release date: July 26, 1913
- Running time: 6 episodes
- Country: United States
- Language: Silent with English intertitles

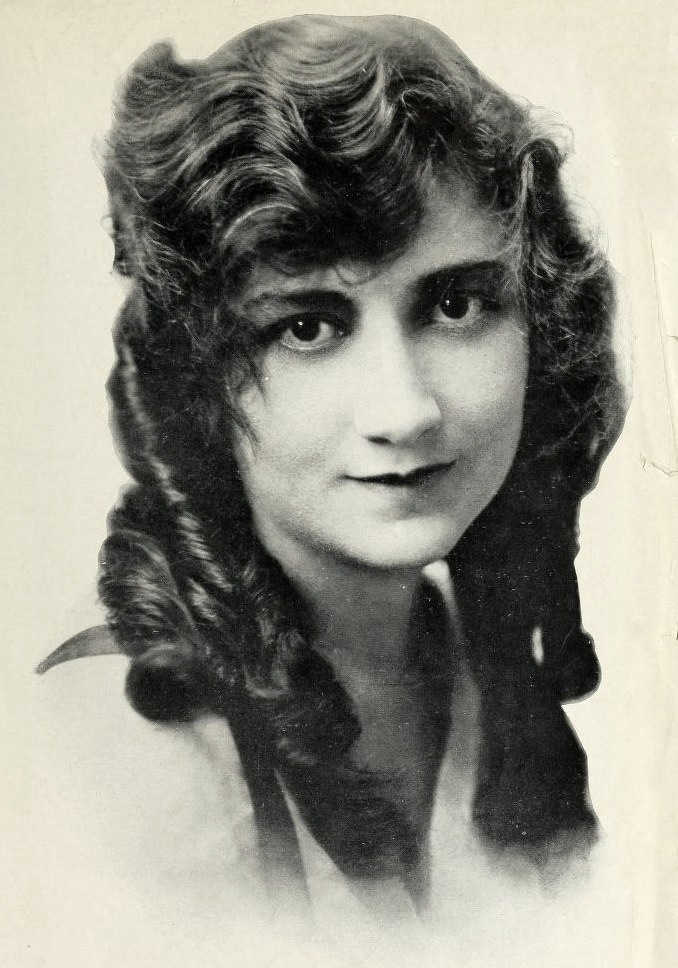
Mary Fuller as she appeared in a 1915 magazine.

Who Will Marry Mary? is a 1913 American action film serial starring Mary Fuller. The film is a sequel to the 1912 serial, What Happened to Mary. While most of the serial is considered to be lost, incomplete prints of episodes one and five survive in the EYE Film Instituut Nederland archive and at Keene Stage College respectively. A digitized print of the first episode "A Proposal From The Duke" was uploaded onto YouTube by the EYE Film Instituut Channel in 2016.

== Cast ==
- Mary Fuller as Mary Cuyler
- Ben F. Wilson as Captain Justin Bradford (as Ben Wilson)
- Richard Tucker as Duke Leonardo de Ferrara
- Harry Beaumont
- Miriam Nesbitt
- Marc McDermott
- Harold M. Shaw
- William Wadsworth
- May Abbey
- Frank McGlynn Sr.
- Walter Edwin

== Chapter titles ==
1. A Proposal From The Duke
2. A Proposal From The Spanish Don
3. A Proposal From The Sculptor
4. A Proposal From Nobody
5. A Proposal Deferred
6. A Proposal From Mary
