= Pigs Is Pigs (1910 film) =

1910 film

- Based on: 1905 serial Pigs Is Pigs by Ellis Parker Butler
- Produced by: Edison Manufacturing Company
- Starring: Charles M. Seay; Miriam Nesbitt; Augustus Phillips
- Distributed by: General Film Company
- Release date: December 14, 1910
- Running time: short 1 reel
- Country: USA
- Language: Silent...English titles

Pigs Is Pigs is a 1910 silent film short written by Ellis Parker Butler and starring Charles M. Seay and Miriam Nesbitt. It was produced by the Edison Manufacturing Company.

== Cast ==
- Charles M. Seay
- Miriam Nesbitt
- Augustus Phillips
- Jessie Stevens
