= The Child and the Tramp =

1911 film

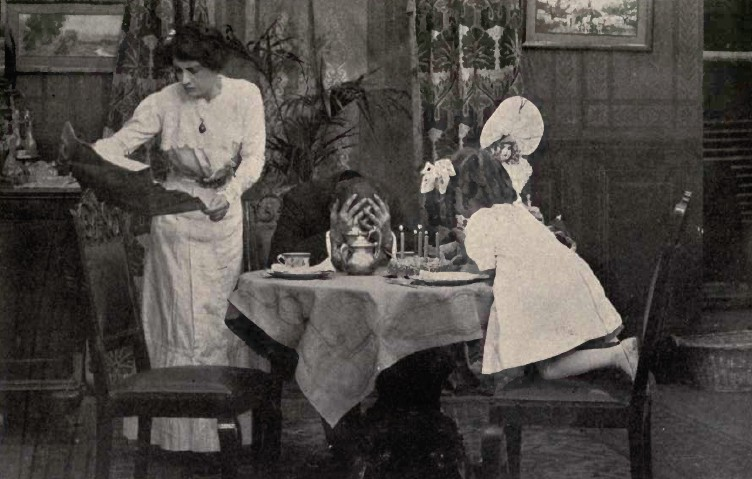
- The Child and the Tramp
- Directed by: Bannister Merwin
- Written by: Bannister Merwin
- Produced by: Edison Manufacturing Company
- Starring: Charles M. Seay; Miriam Nesbitt
- Distributed by: General Film Company
- Release date: April 28, 1911
- Country: USA
- Language: Silent..English titles

The Child and the Tramp is a 1911 American silent short comedy film directed by Bannister Merwin. It was produced by the Edison Manufacturing Company and was released on 28 April 1911. The film, a short, had an approximative length of 1000 ft of footage (one reel). It adapts a story by Albert Mallory. The plot revolves around a tramp who refuses to become a burglar and is welcomed into a family that adopts him as one of their own.

== Plot ==
A contemporary magazine summarises the plot: "Reckles is a tramp who finds that two of his old road companions have "struck it rich" through a fake mining scheme. Some months later, "Reckless" lands in Southern California for the winter, and in asking for a "hand-out" is astonished to be received as one of the family and invited to dinner. He lingers to replace a broken toy, for he is skilled as a wood carver, and his work leads the father to ask why he does not work for a living."

The family is ruined by the collapse of the Golden Valley Money Company, that the old companions of Reckless had robbed. Reckless manages to get hold of a part of the money and gives it back to the family on the child's birthday.

== Cast ==
- Charles M. Seay as Reckless, 1st tramp
- William West as 2nd tramp
- John R. Cumpson as 3rd tramp
- Harold M. Shaw as The Child's Father
- Miriam Nesbitt as The Child's Mother
- Edna May Weick as The Child

== Reception ==
"The tramp has been the subject of much of the socalled humor of the comic papers and would seem very unlikely material for a hero, but in this story is again exemplified that idea that within each of us is a true prince if we would only allow the spirit to have its way.", wrote a contemporary review.

"All the characters in this playlet do excellent work, but the tramp in the picture is so far superior to any we bave heretofore seen that we wish to mention him especially.", wrote The Billboard.
