= The Last Sentence (1917 film) =

1917 silent film by Ben Turbett

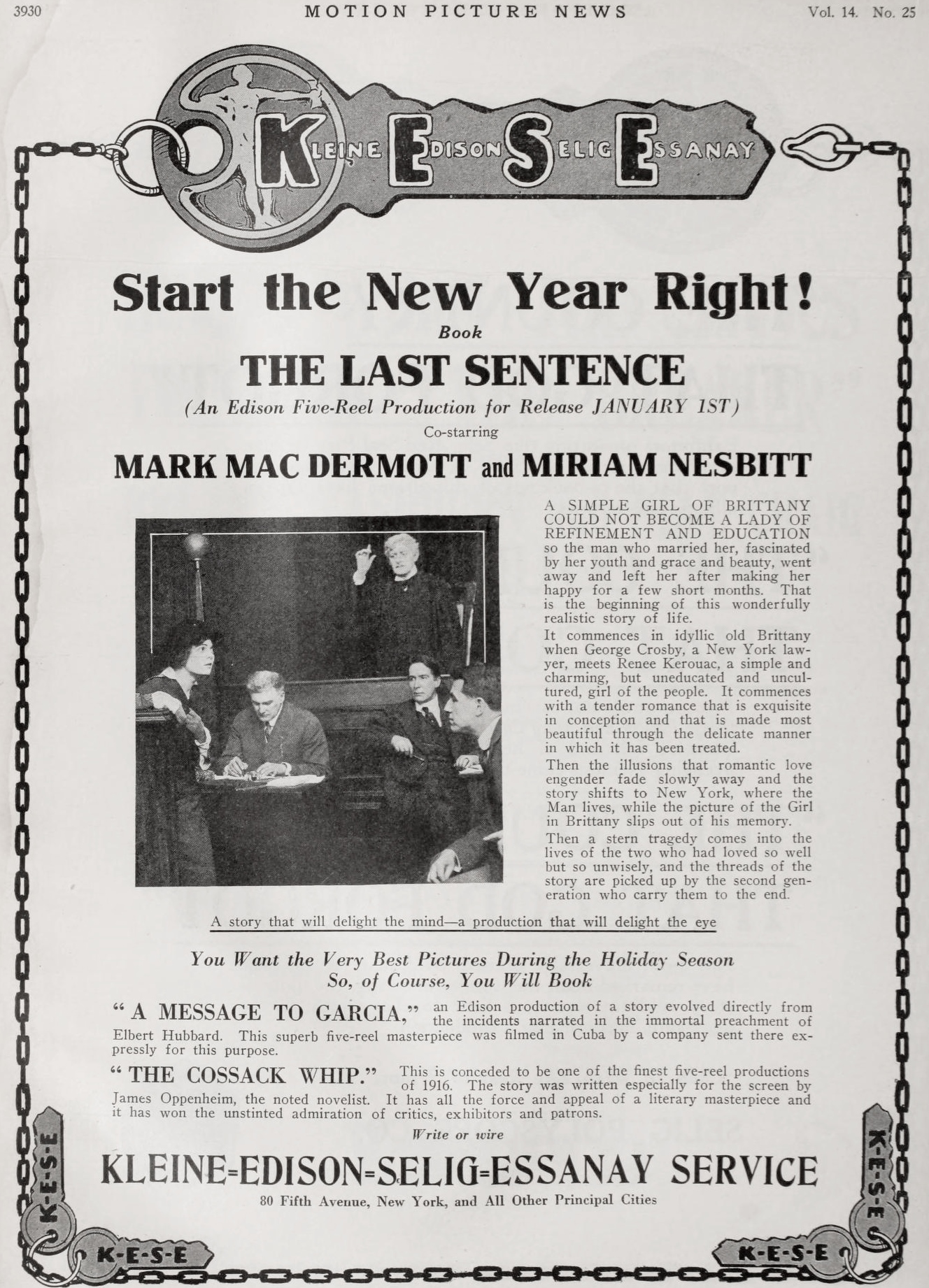
- Directed by: Ben Turbett
- Written by: Maxwell Gray (novel); Edward H. Griffith
- Starring: Marc McDermott; Miriam Nesbitt; Herbert Prior
- Production company: Edison Studios
- Distributed by: K-E-S-E Service
- Release date: January 1, 1917
- Running time: 50 minutes
- Country: United States
- Languages: Silent; English intertitles

The Last Sentence is a 1917 American silent drama film directed by Ben Turbett and starring Marc McDermott, Miriam Nesbitt and Herbert Prior.

== Main cast ==
- Marc McDermott as George Crosby
- Miriam Nesbitt as Cynthia Ford
- Grace Williams as Renée Kerouac
- Herbert Prior as Hoel Calloc
- Florence Stover as Mrs. Crosby
- Gladys Gane as Georgiana
- Elaine Ivans as Georgette
- Raymond McKee as Val Lewis
- Margery Bonney Erskine as Mrs. Lewis
- Jessie Stevens as Mére Kerouac
- William Wadsworth as Pére Kerouac

== Bibliography ==
- Langman, Larry. American Film Cycles: The Silent Era. Greenwood Publishing, 1998.
