= Edna's Imprisonment =

- Produced by: Edison Manufacturing Company
- Starring: Miriam Nesbitt; Yale Boss
- Distributed by: General Film Company
- Release date: May 9, 1911
- Running time: 1 reel
- Country: USA
- Language: Silent..English titles

Edna's Imprisonment is a 1911 silent short drama film produced by the Edison Manufacturing Company. It starred Miriam Nesbitt and Yale Boss. Released through the General Film Company.

== Cast ==
- Edna May Weick as Edna
- Miriam Nesbitt
- Yale Boss as The Office Boy
- Guy Coombs
- Charles M. Seay
