= Infidelity (1917 film) =

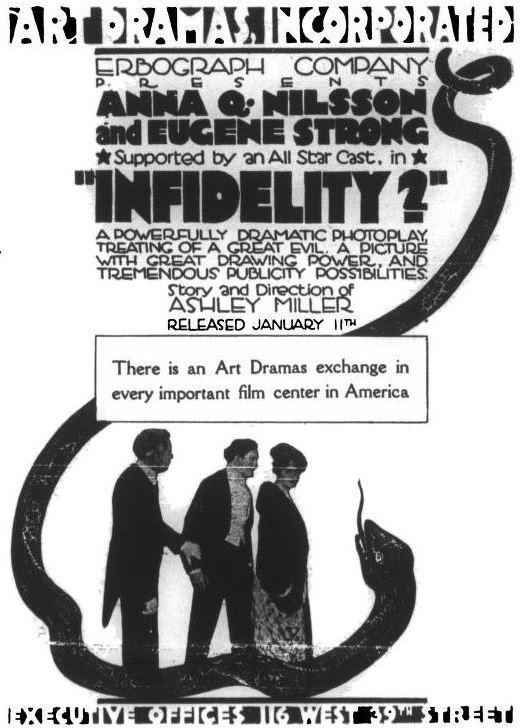
- Directed by: Ashley Miller
- Written by: Ashley Miller
- Produced by: Ludwig G. B. Erb; Erbograph Company
- Starring: Anna Q. Nilsson; Eugene Strong; Miriam Nesbitt
- Distributed by: Art Dramas
- Release date: January 11, 1917
- Running time: 5 reels
- Country: United States
- Language: Silent...English titles

Infidelity is a lost 1917 silent film drama directed by Ashley Miller and starring Anna Q. Nilsson, Eugene Strong and Miriam Nesbitt.

== Cast ==
- Anna Q. Nilsson as Elaine Bernard
- Eugene Strong as Ford Maillard
- Miriam Nesbitt as Dorothy Stafford
- Warren Cook as Cliford Wayne
- Fred C. Jones as Ali Delna
- Elizabeth Spencer as Mrs. Maillard
- Arthur Morrison as John Griswold
