= The Lady of the Photograph =

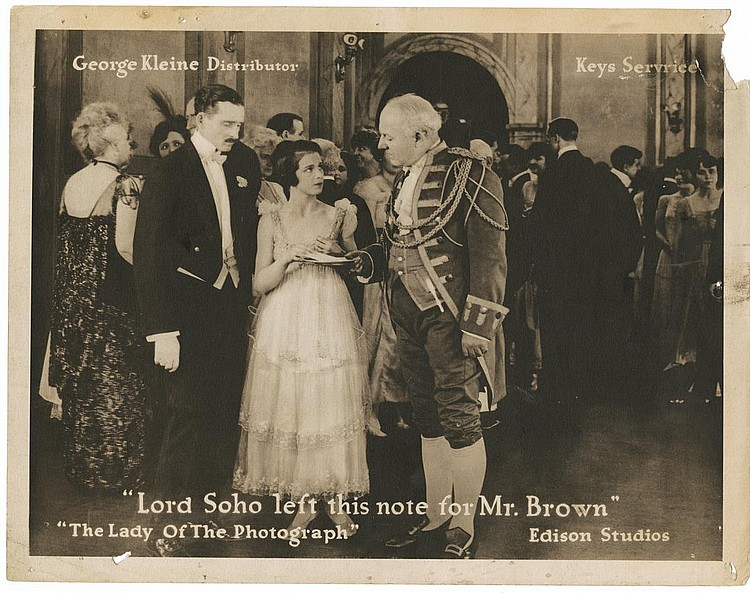
- Directed by: Ben Turbett
- Written by: Henry Albert Phillips; Paul Sloane
- Produced by: George Kleine
- Starring: Shirley Mason; Raymond McKee; Gerald Pring
- Cinematography: Fred S. Brace
- Production companies: Perfection Pictures; Edison Productions
- Distributed by: K-E-S-E Service
- Release date: August 27, 1917
- Running time: 50 minutes
- Country: United States
- Languages: Silent; English intertitles

The Lady of the Photograph is a 1917 American silent comedy drama film directed by Ben Turbett and starring Shirley Mason, Raymond McKee and Gerald Pring. It was made by the Edison Studios shortly before they withdrew from production activities.

== Synopsis ==
An aristocratic but impoverished young Englishman meets an American woman in Britain, but fears he cannot be worthy of her until he has settled his debts. However a self-made American he meets on his ship across the Atlantic offers to help him out financially in exchange for helping him to become a gentleman so that he can woo a woman whose photograph he carries around with him. The Englishman is shocked to discover that it is the same woman he in love with.

== Cast ==
- Shirley Mason as Marjorie Van Dam
- Raymond McKee as Ferdinand 'Ferdy' Latimer
- Royal Byron as John Brown
- Dudley Hill as Eric Latimer
- William Calhoun as Cornelius Van Dam
- Gerald Pring as Captain Latimer
- Jane Harvey as Mrs. Van Dam

== Bibliography ==
- Robert B. Connelly. The Silents: Silent Feature Films, 1910-36. December Press, 1998.
