= Monsieur (1911 film) =

- Produced by: Edison Manufacturing Company; Thomas Edison
- Starring: Marc McDermott; Miriam Nesbitt; Robyn Adair
- Distributed by: General Film Company
- Release date: April 4, 1911
- Running time: 1 reel
- Country: USA
- Language: Silent..English titles

Monsieur is a 1911 silent short romantic drama film produced by the Edison Manufacturing Company. It starred Marc McDermott and Miriam Nesbitt a husband and wife acting couple. General Film Company released the film.

== Cast ==
- Marc McDermott
- Miriam Nesbitt
- Robert Conness
- Nancy Avril
