= Pigs Is Pigs (1954 film) =

- Directed by: Jack Kinney
- Story by: Leo Salkin
- Produced by: Walt Disney
- Starring: Bill Thompson; Rhys Williams; Dallas McKennon; The Mellomen
- Narrated by: Bill Woodson
- Music by: Oliver Wallace
- Animation by: John Sibley; Dan MacManus (effects)
- Layouts by: John Wilson; Bruce Bushman
- Backgrounds by: Eyvind Earle; Al Dempster
- Color process: Technicolor
- Production company: Walt Disney Productions
- Distributed by: RKO Radio Pictures
- Release date: May 21, 1954
- Running time: 9:44
- Country: United States
- Language: English

Pigs Is Pigs is a 1954 animated film by Walt Disney Studios. Based on the story "Pigs Is Pigs" by Ellis Parker Butler, it relates the tale of a railway agent and his problems with a shipment of two guinea pigs that proceed to breed rapidly. The cartoon was animated in the flat, colorful UPA style. The melody of the traditional Irish jig "The Irish Washerwoman" is repeated throughout the short.

== Plot ==
Flannery, a railway station manager who carries out all his activities based on his company's manual, receives a shipment of two guinea pigs. When the shipment's receiver, McMorehouse, arrives to collect them, Flannery deems that he must pay a 48-cent fee, which is the standard for farmed pigs. McMorehouse protests that the animals are pets, which are only subject to a 44-cent fee, but Flannery insists that "pigs is pigs".

Following the railroad's rules for fee disputes, Flannery sends a telegram to the head office asking for clarification, keeping hold of the animals in the meantime. However, he discovers that the two guinea pigs are a breeding pair. The animals multiply quickly, filling up the railroad station and forcing Flannery to resort to increasingly desperate methods to keep them fed and contained.

At the railroad office, Flannery's inquiry goes through several layers of bureaucracy, eventually reaching the company's president and board of directors. The board brings in a zoologist, who informs them that guinea pigs are unrelated to pigs, and thus the 44-cent rate should apply.

Upon receiving the news, Flannery rushes to McMorehouse to deliver the guinea pigs, only to discover that he has moved. There is no rule covering such a situation, so Flannery again sends a telegram for clarification. The railroad office, also unsure, tells Flannery to send the animals to the head office, and Flannery packs the animals, by now numbering a million and two, onto a departing train. As the still-multiplying guinea pigs cause havoc in the office, Flannery swears that, in the future, he will classify any four-legged animal he receives as a pet.

== Academy Awards ==
The short was nominated for an Academy Award for Best Animated Short Film. but lost to UPA's When Magoo Flew.

== Home media ==
The short was released on December 6, 2005, on Walt Disney Treasures: Disney Rarities - Celebrated Shorts: 1920s–1960s.
