= The Satin Girl =

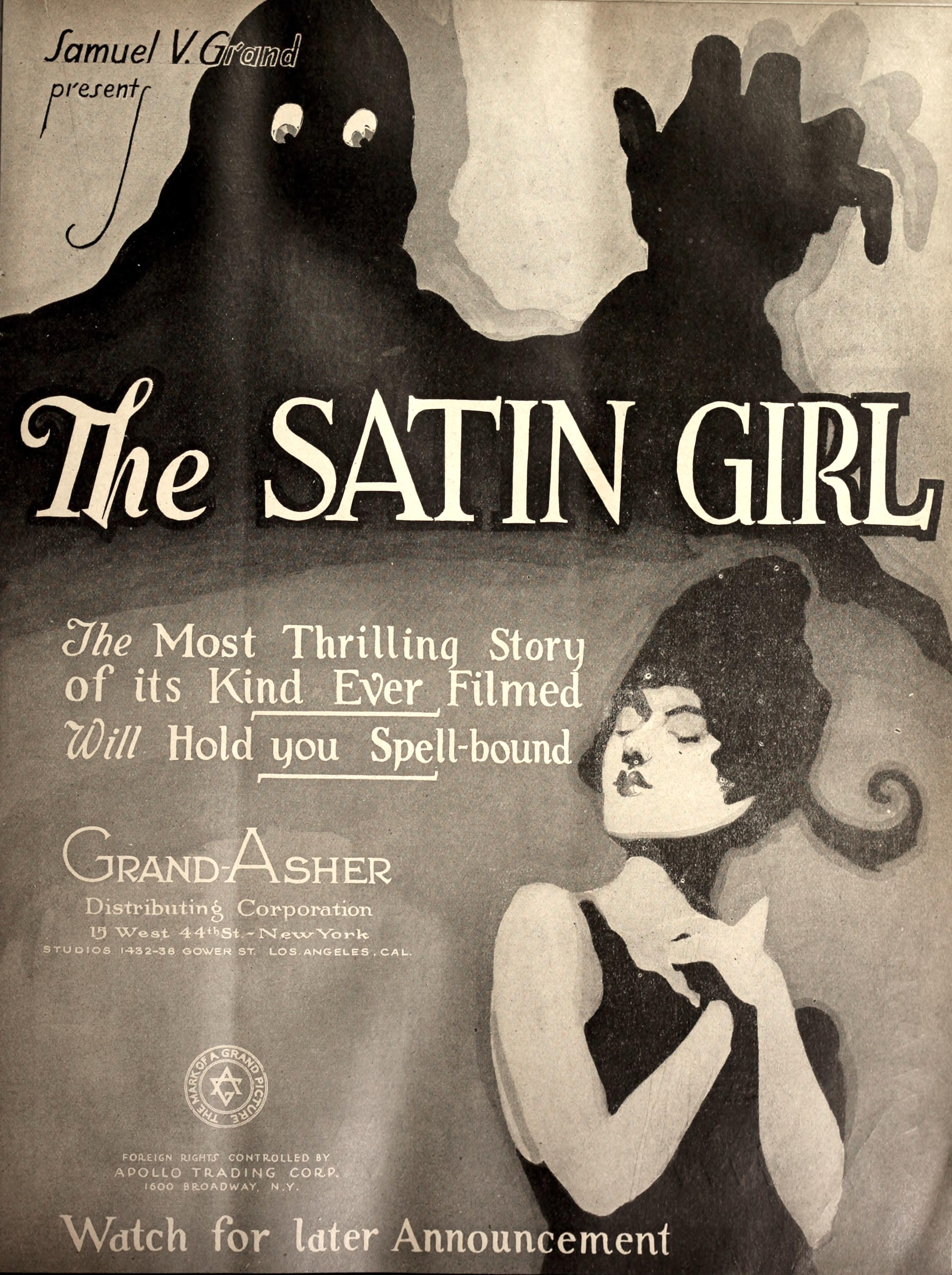
- Advertisement for the film
- Directed by: Arthur Rosson
- Written by: George H. Plympton; Adam Shirk; Arthur F. Statter
- Produced by: Ben F. Wilson
- Starring: Mabel Forrest; Norman Kerry; Marc McDermott
- Production company: Ben Wilson Productions
- Distributed by: Grand Asher Distributing Corporation
- Release date: November 30, 1923
- Running time: 60 minutes
- Country: United States
- Language: Silent (English intertitles)

The Satin Girl is a 1923 American silent drama film directed by Arthur Rosson and starring Mabel Forrest, Norman Kerry, and Marc McDermott. The main themes of the film are amnesia and brainwashing. Lenore Vance, the main character, loses her memory due to shock. A wicked uncle reprograms her into a robber.

== Plot ==
The story revolves around a young woman named Lenore Vance, who loses her memory after witnessing the death of her father Silas Gregg. She commits a series of robberies due to being brainwashed by her elderly, reclusive, chemist uncle named Fargo. She later becomes the person of interest in the murder of her father, being labelled by the authorities as "The Satin Girl". A physician named Dr. Richard Taunton meets Lenore at a party thrown by Millie Brown-Potter, and becomes infatuated with her. After discovering that Lenore has taken pieces of jewelry from himself and Mrs. Potter, he uses a piece of evidence left behind to investigate the crimes himself, and makes the discovery that Fargo is the one who killed Silas. The police are notified, but they discover that he has committed suicide upon arriving at his house. It is later revealed to the audience that the entire story is in a book that Lenore is reading.

== Cast ==
- Mabel Forrest as Lenore Vance
- Norman Kerry as Dr. Richard Taunton
- Marc McDermott as Fargo Gregg
- Clarence Burton as Moran
- Florence Lawrence as Sylvia
- Kate Lester as Millie Brown-Potter
- Reed House as Norton Pless
- William H. Turner as Silas Gregg
- Walter Stephens as Harg

== Reception ==
The film received high praise for its casting upon release. C.S Sewell of The Moving Picture World writes: "Norman Kerry is well cast as the young physician and Marc McDermott is effective as the master-criminal. Mabel Forrest does good work as the girl. The remainder of the cast is satisfactory." One reviewer from Variety says: "Mabel Forrest can act, and does so with skill and intelligence. Then there's Marc McDermott, a character actor who classes with the very best of the screen's handful of the good ones. Norman Kerry gives a dignified portrayal of the M.D., and the contributory parts are unusually well played."

== Preservation ==
With no holdings located in archives, The Satin Girl is considered a lost film.

== Bibliography ==
- Connelly, Robert B. The Silents: Silent Feature Films, 1910-36, Volume 40, Issue 2. December Press, 1998.
