= A Christmas Carol (1910 film) =

1910 silent film by J. Searle Dawley

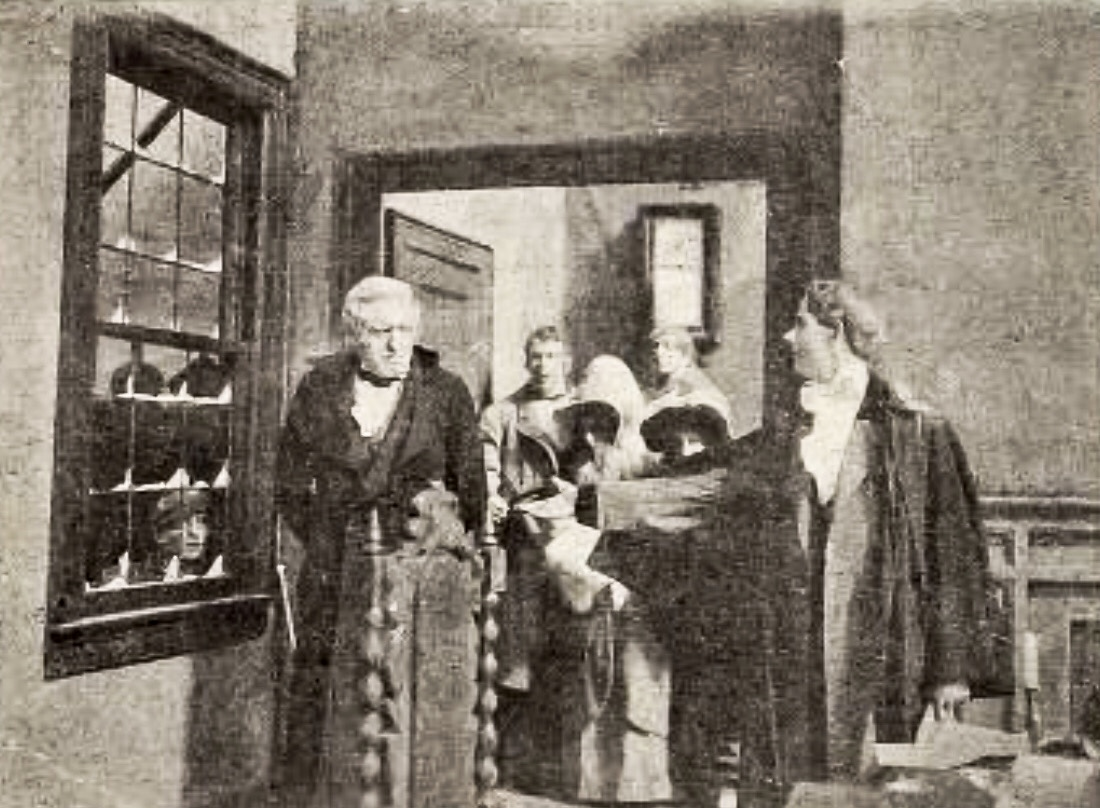
- Still of Scrooge, left, refusing to shake hands with his nephew
- Directed by: J. Searle Dawley
- Story by: Charles Dickens
- Based on: A Christmas Carol; 1843 novella by Charles Dickens
- Starring: Marc McDermott; Charles S. Ogle
- Distributed by: Edison Manufacturing Company
- Release date: December 23, 1910
- Running time: 13 minutes
- Country: United States
- Languages: Silent film English intertitles

A Christmas Carol is a 1910 silent drama film directed by J. Searle Dawley and produced at Edison Studios in The Bronx in New York City. After the 1901 British release Scrooge, or, Marley's Ghost, this American version of Charles Dickens' 1843 novella is the second oldest surviving screen adaptation of the famous literary work. It features Marc McDermott as Ebenezer Scrooge and Charles S. Ogle as Bob Cratchit.

The film is approximately 13 minutes long and was produced as a one-reel silent film, a standard format for the era. Similar to many films of the era, it was staged similar to a play with a stationary camera and actors performing full view in frame.

== Plot ==
The day before Christmas, miserly Ebenezer Scrooge refuses to contribute to the Charity Relief Committee, and then rudely rejects his nephew Fred when he visits Scrooge in his office. When Scrooge returns home, he sees the ghost of his former business partner Jacob Marley, who warns him of the punishment he will suffer in the next life if he does not change his ways. That night, Scrooge is visited by three more spirits, who show him his past, present, and future. After Scrooge is shown a vision of his own death by the final spirit, he is frightened into realizing the consequences of his life. He wakes up on Christmas morning transformed and joyful.

== Cast ==
PLAY full copy of film; runtime 00:13:00

- Marc McDermott as Ebenezer Scrooge
- Charles S. Ogle as Bob Cratchit
- William Bechtel, uncredited
- Viola Dana, uncredited 13-year-old child
- Carey Lee, uncredited
- Harold M. Shaw, Fred, Scrooge's nephew, uncredited
- Shirley Mason, uncredited 10-year-old child

== See also ==
- List of Christmas films
- List of ghost films
- List of American films of 1910
- List of A Christmas Carol adaptations
