= Carrie Clark Ward =

American actress (1862–1926)

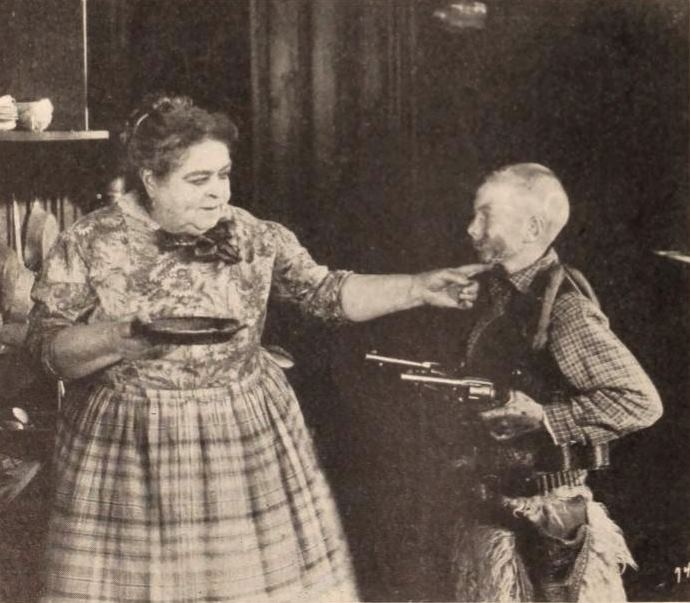
- Ward and Wesley Barry in Bob Hampton of Placer (1921)
- Born: January 9, 1862; Virginia City, Nevada Territory, US
- Died: February 6, 1926 (aged 64); Hollywood, California, US
- Occupation: Actress
- Years active: 1911–1925

Carrie Clark Ward (January 9, 1862 – February 6, 1926) was an American actress of the silent era.

== Biography ==
Ward was born in Virginia City, Nevada, in 1862.

In 1885 Clark acted in a company at the San Francisco Bush Street Theatre.

Ward appeared in more than 60 films from 1911 to 1925. Ward appeared in numerous silent films in the company of many stars, including her comic turn in the Rudolph Valentino-Clarence Brown directed classic The Eagle 1925.

Ward was married to J. Sedley Browne, the first husband of Henrietta Crosman. In 1879, she married comedian and actor James M. Ward.

Ward died on February 6, 1926, in Hollywood, California.

== Partial filmography ==
- How Spriggins Took Lodgers (1911)
- The Bank (1915)
- The Conqueror (1917)
- One Touch of Sin (1917)
- Under the Yoke (1918)
- Cheating the Public (1918)
- The Siren's Song (1919)
- Daddy-Long-Legs (1919)
- Why Smith Left Home (1919)
- Wolves of the Night (1919)
- The Paliser Case (1920)
- Old Lady 31 (1920)
- The Land of Jazz (1920)
- Sham (1921)
- Black Roses (1921)
- One Wild Week (1921)
- Bob Hampton of Placer (1921)
- Her Winning Way (1921)
- Miss Lulu Bett (1921)
- The Top of New York (1922)
- Ashes (1922)
- Soul of the Beast (1923)
- Can a Woman Love Twice? (1923)
- Scaramouche (1923)
- Breaking Into Society (1923)
- Dante's Inferno (1924)
- His Hour (1924)
- Thundering Hoofs (1924)
- The Man in Blue (1925)
- The Eagle (1925)
- The Golden Cocoon (1925)
- Rose of the World (1925)
