= The Man Who Disappeared (film serial) =

1914 film

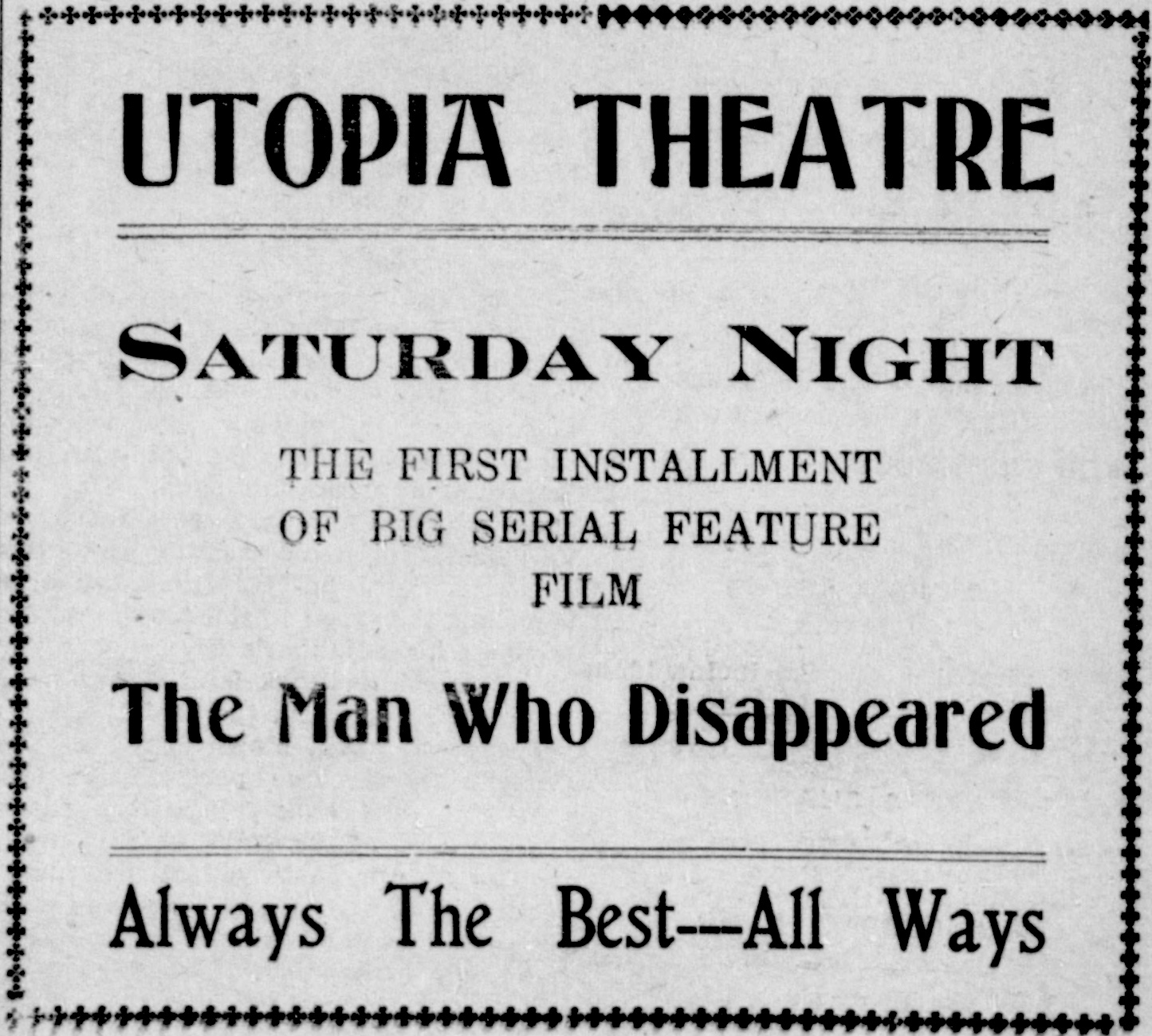
- Contemporary advertisement
- Directed by: Charles Brabin
- Written by: Richard Washburn Child
- Produced by: Edison Manufacturing Company
- Starring: Marc McDermott; Herbert Yost
- Distributed by: Edison Company
- Release date: April 7, 1914
- Running time: 10 episodes
- Country: United States
- Language: Silent with English intertitles

The Man Who Disappeared is a 1914 American drama film serial directed by Charles Brabin. The film is considered lost.

== Cast ==
- Marc McDermott as John Perriton
- Herbert Yost as Nelson Wales (credited as Barry O'Moore)
- Miriam Nesbitt as Mary Wales
- Marjorie Ellison as Jennie
- Cora Williams
- Harry Eytinge as Lawyer Lipman
- Charles Ogle as Miens
- T. Tamamoto as Den Keeper
- Harry Mason
- Harry Linson
- Joseph Manning
- Floyd France
- George D. Melville
- Warren Cook

== See also ==
- List of film serials
- List of film serials by studio
