= A Huntress of Men =

1916 film by Lucius J. Henderson

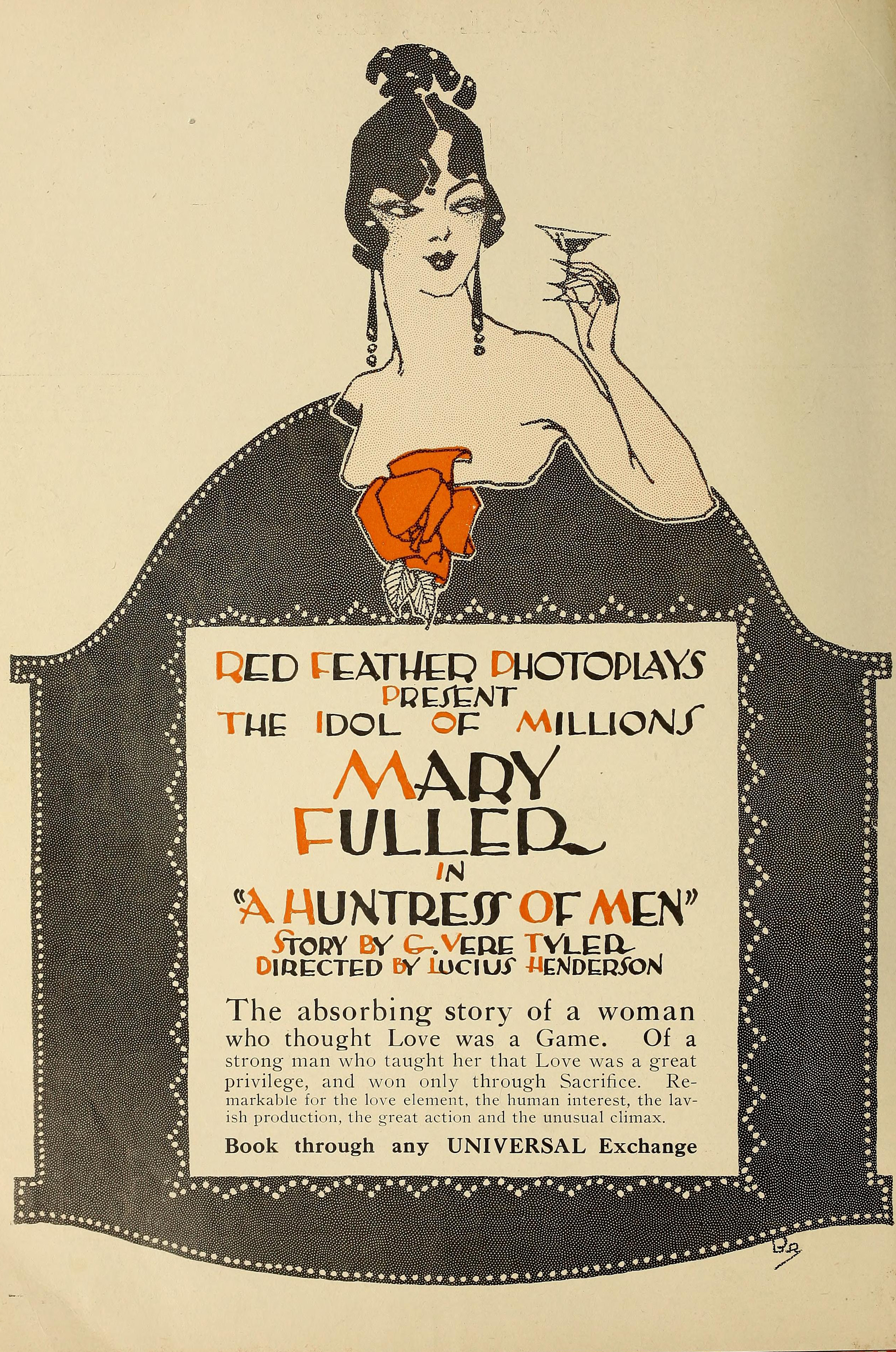
- Advertisement for A Huntress of Men in Motion Picture News
- Directed by: Lucius J. Henderson
- Written by: Catherine Carr (scenario)
- Story by: G. Vere Tyler
- Starring: Mary Fuller; Joseph W. Girard; Sidney Bracey
- Production company: Red Feather Photoplays
- Distributed by: Red Feather Photoplays
- Release date: May 8, 1916
- Running time: 5 reels
- Country: United States
- Languages: Silent film (English intertitles)

A Huntress of Men is a 1916 American silent drama film directed by Lucius J. Henderson and starring Mary Fuller, Joseph W. Girard, and Sidney Bracey. The film was released by Red Feather Photoplays on May 6, 1916.

== Cast ==
- Mary Fuller as The Huntress
- Joseph W. Girard as Fleming Harcourt
- Sidney Bracey as Ned Ashley (as Sydney Bracey)

== Preservation ==
The film is now considered lost.
