= Charles M. Seay =

American film director

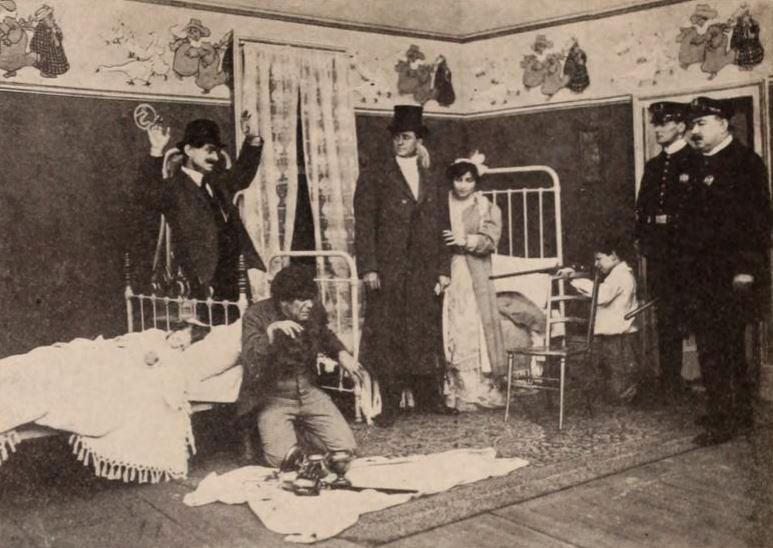
Charles M. Seay with raised hands in The Stuff That Americans Are Made Of (1910)

Charles M. Seay (1867–1944) was an American film director, scriptwriter, and actor. He was employed by the Edison Manufacturing Company, and directed over 80 short films.

He was cast along with a couple of other film directors in the Broadway musical comedy about the film industry The Squab Farm.

== Partial filmography ==
- Pigs Is Pigs (1910)
- The Child and the Tramp (1911)
- Edna's Imprisonment (1911)
- The Adventure of the Wrong Santa Claus (1914) (director)
- Blue Grass (1915) (director)
