= Turned to the Wall =

1911 silent short film

- Based on: Put Yourself in My Place by Charles Reade
- Produced by: Edison Manufacturing Company; Thomas Edison
- Starring: Charles Ogle; Miriam Nesbitt; Mary Fuller
- Distributed by: General Film Company
- Release date: April 21, 1911
- Running time: 1 reel
- Country: United States
- Language: Silent..English titles

Turned to the Wall is a 1911 silent short film produced by the Edison Manufacturing Company. It starred Charles Ogle, Miriam Nesbitt and Mary Fuller. Based on a story by Charles Reade.

== Cast ==
- Charles Ogle - Squire Ruby
- Miriam Nesbitt _
- Mary Fuller –
- William Bechtel –
- Guy Coombs – Young Ruby, Squire's son
