= Cy Whittaker's Ward =

1917 silent film

- Directed by: Ben Turbett
- Written by: Samuel Greiner
- Starring: William Wadsworth; Shirley Mason; W.H. Burton
- Cinematography: Fred S. Brace
- Production companies: Perfection Pictures; Edison Studios
- Distributed by: George Kleine System
- Release date: October 22, 1917
- Running time: 50 minutes
- Country: United States
- Languages: Silent; English intertitles

Cy Whittaker's Ward is a 1917 American silent drama film directed by Ben Turbett and starring William Wadsworth, Shirley Mason and W.H. Burton.

== Cast ==
- William Wadsworth as Captain Cy Whittaker
- Shirley Mason as Emily Thomas
- W.H. Burton as Herman Atkins
- Carter B. Harkness as Richard Thomas
- Mary Elizabeth Forbes as Phoebe Daws
- Emily Lorraine as Sarah Oliver
- Leslie Hunt as Ase
- Wallis Clark as Bailey
- Ed Bunnell as Tad
- George O'Donnell as Lem
- Hugh Gillen as Buddy
- Edward M. Favor as Eben
- Justus D. Barnes as Simmons
- George Bradley as Josiah

== Bibliography ==
- Marina Dahlquist & Joel Frykholm. The Institutionalization of Educational Cinema: North America and Europe in the 1910s and 1920s. Indiana University Press, 2020.
