= Philo Gubb =

The character of Philo Gubb was created by prolific pulp fiction writer Ellis Parker Butler and first appeared in the May 1913 issue of Redbook magazine. Philo Gubb attained such a high level of popularity that the author's attempt to kill the character off was derailed by public pressure.

Philo Gubb is a small-town paperhanger who learned his deductive technique by correspondence course, admires Sherlock Holmes, and "commits a major crime during every case on which he works: the murder of the English language"—most notably by invariably referring to himself as a “deteckative.” (Other characters use the correct pronunciation.) Gubb differs from many mainstream fictional detectives in that he is not brilliant, clever, nor egocentric, but he is persistent, good-natured, and occasionally displays common sense. Also in contrast, his work may be characterized by elaborate disguises that deceive nobody, theories that are overhauled at every clue, and the often unintentional solving of mysteries. The nature of the character and his work methods help to create intentionally humorous situations.

== Short stories ==
- Philo Gubb, The Correspondence School Detective (1913) (or "The Hard-Boiled Egg")
- Philo Gubb and the Oubliette (1913)
- Philo Gubb and the Un-burglars(1913)
- Philo Gubb and the Two-Cent Stamp (1913)
- Philo Gubb and the Chicken (1913)
- Philo Gubb and the Dragon's Eye (1913)
- The Progressive Murder (1913)
- Red Cedar! (1914)
- The Pet (1914)
- The Eagle's Claws (1914)
- The Missing Mister Master (1914)
- Waffles and Mustard (1914)
- The Anonymous Wiggle (1914)
- The Half of a Thousand (1915)
- Dietz's 7642, Bessie John (1915)
- Buried Bones (1915)
- Philo Gubb's Greatest Case (1915)
- The Togbury Jool (1915)
- One Hundred Dollars Reward (1915)
- Henry (1915)
- The Disappearance of Ma'y Jane (1915)
- The Premature Death of Philo Gubb (1915)
- The Stolen Umbrella (1915)
- Four Tufts of Golden Hair (1915)
- The Inexorable Tooth (1915)
- The Carnival of Crime (1916)
- This Style, $20 (1916)
- The Parmiller Pounds (1916)
- The Kinwiller Case (1916)
- The Ghatghee (1916)
- In the Dark! (1916)
- The Needle, Watson (1916)
- The Dark Closet (1916)
- Too Much Gubb (1916)
- The Hound of the Tankervilles (1916)
- The Tenth of June (1916)
- Who Would Steal a Pump? (1916)
- The Last Case of Philo Gubb (1917)
- The McNoodle Brothers' Radio Mystery (1923)
- The Sword Swallower Murder (1933)
