= Ashley Miller (director) =

American film director

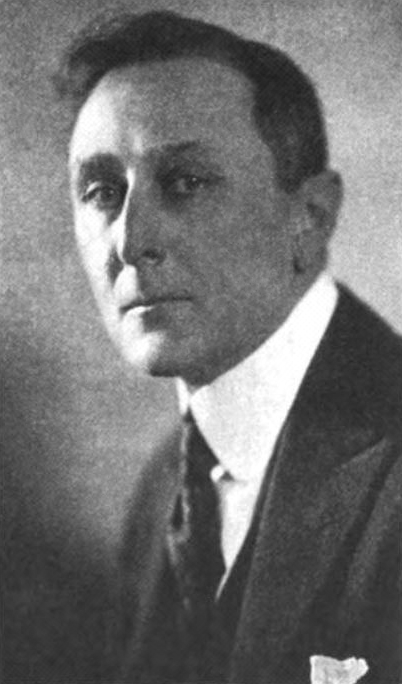
- Born: August 11, 1877; Cincinnati, Ohio, US
- Died: November 19, 1949 (aged 72); New York, New York, US
- Occupation(s): Director, screenwriter, playwright, actor
- Spouse: Ethel Browning (m. 1899)
- Children: 1

Ashley Miller (August 11, 1877 – November 19, 1949) was an American director, screenwriter, playwright, and actor. He directed 133 films between 1909 and 1923.

Miller was born in Cincinnati and attended schools in Detroit, Michigan.

Miller's stage debut came in September 1904 when he portrayed Francois in a production of Richelieu. He went on to act with stock theater companies in Boston, Chicago, New York, and Philadelphia. Plays in which he performed include Prince Otto, Romeo and Juliet, A Midsummer Night's Dream, My Lady Peggy Goes to Town, and The Parisian Model. His roles in the latter two productions were singing parts.

Miller formed a troupe that presented plays in New York City's schools and settlement houses. He also worked as a director of silent films for the Edison Biograph Studio.

In 1933, Miller became executive secretary of the State Relief Fund, an organization created by "prominent actors, producers and playwrights".

Miller was married to actress Ethel Browning from 1899 until his death in 1949, and they had a son, Ashley. He died on November 19, 1949, in New York.

== Selected filmography ==
- An Island Comedy (1911)
- Children Who Labor (1912)
- The House of Fear (1915)
- The Quest of Life (1916)
- Infidelity (1917)
- The Princess of Park Row (1917)
- The Marriage Speculation (1917)
