= Yale Boss =

American actor (1899–1977)

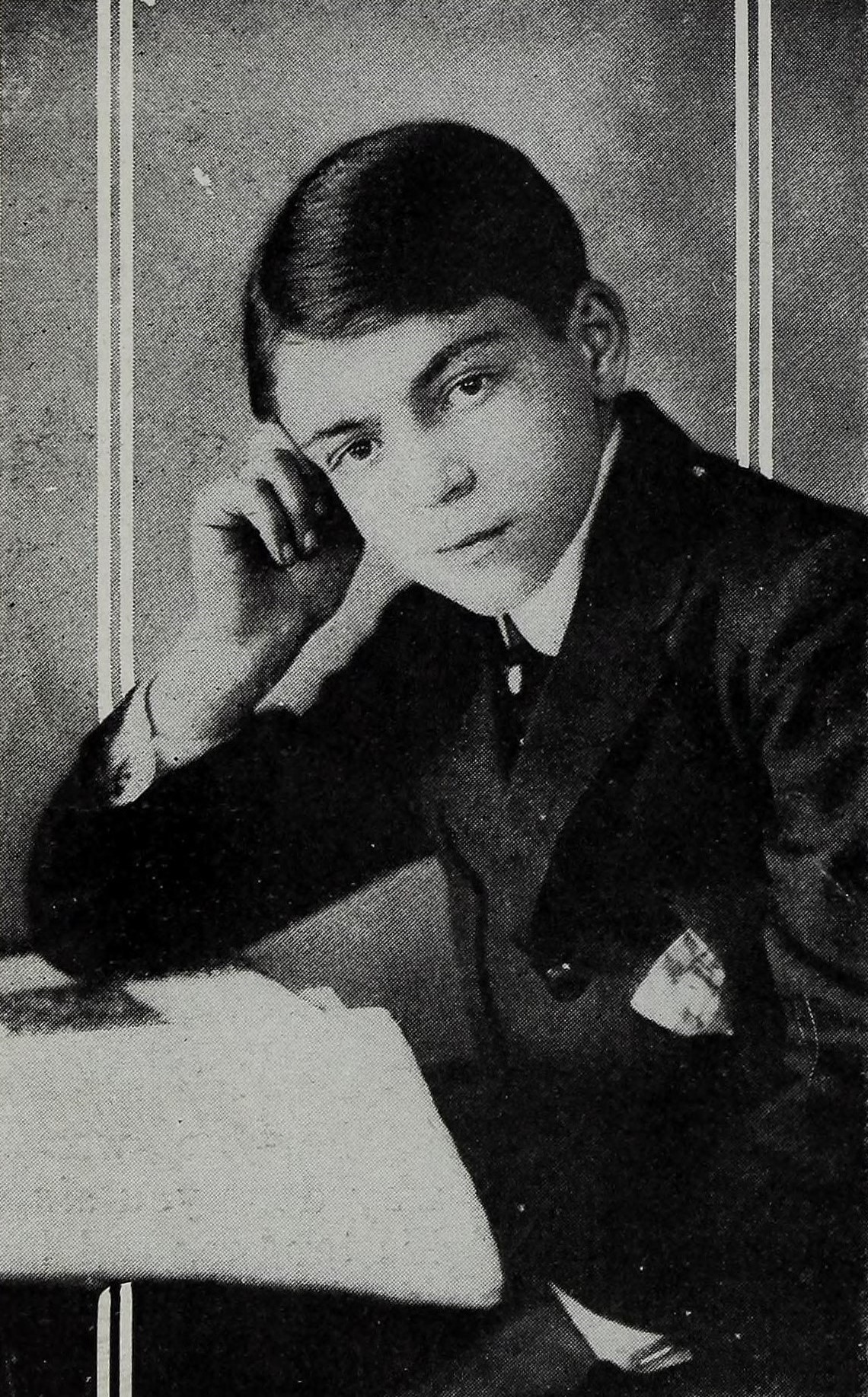
- c. 1915
- Born: October 18, 1899; Utica, New York, U.S.
- Died: November 16, 1977 (aged 78); Augusta, Georgia, U.S.
- Occupation: Actor
- Years active: 1910–1923

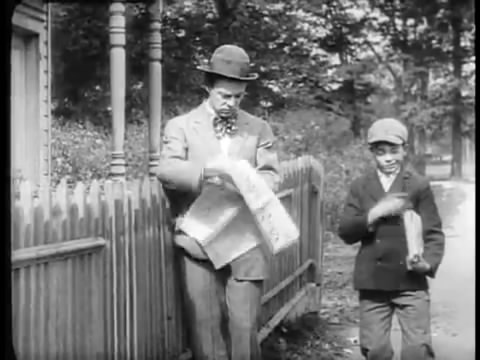
Boss on right in The Totville Eye (1912), with Harry Beaumont on left

Yale Boss (October 18, 1899 – November 16, 1977) was an American child actor of the silent screen.

== Biography ==
New York-born Boss was one of the screen's first child stars. He was already a stage veteran when he made his screen debut in Thanhouser's The Actor's Children (1910). He appeared on Broadway opposite Adeline Genée in The Silver Star.

Later he became one of Edison Studios's most popular players, but the studio constantly had to battle rumors questioning his true age. Boss's popularity waned in the late 1910s and he later worked as a prop man.

By the time of his death at age 78, the former actor was operating a garage in Augusta, Georgia.

== Partial filmography ==
- The Actor's Children (1910)
- Edna's Imprisonment (1911)
- Dolly of the Dailies (1914)

== Bibliography ==
- John Holmstrom, The Moving Picture Boy: An International Encyclopaedia from 1895 to 1995, Norwich, Michael Russell, 1996, pp. 14-15.
