= Ellis Parker Butler =

American writer (1869–1937)

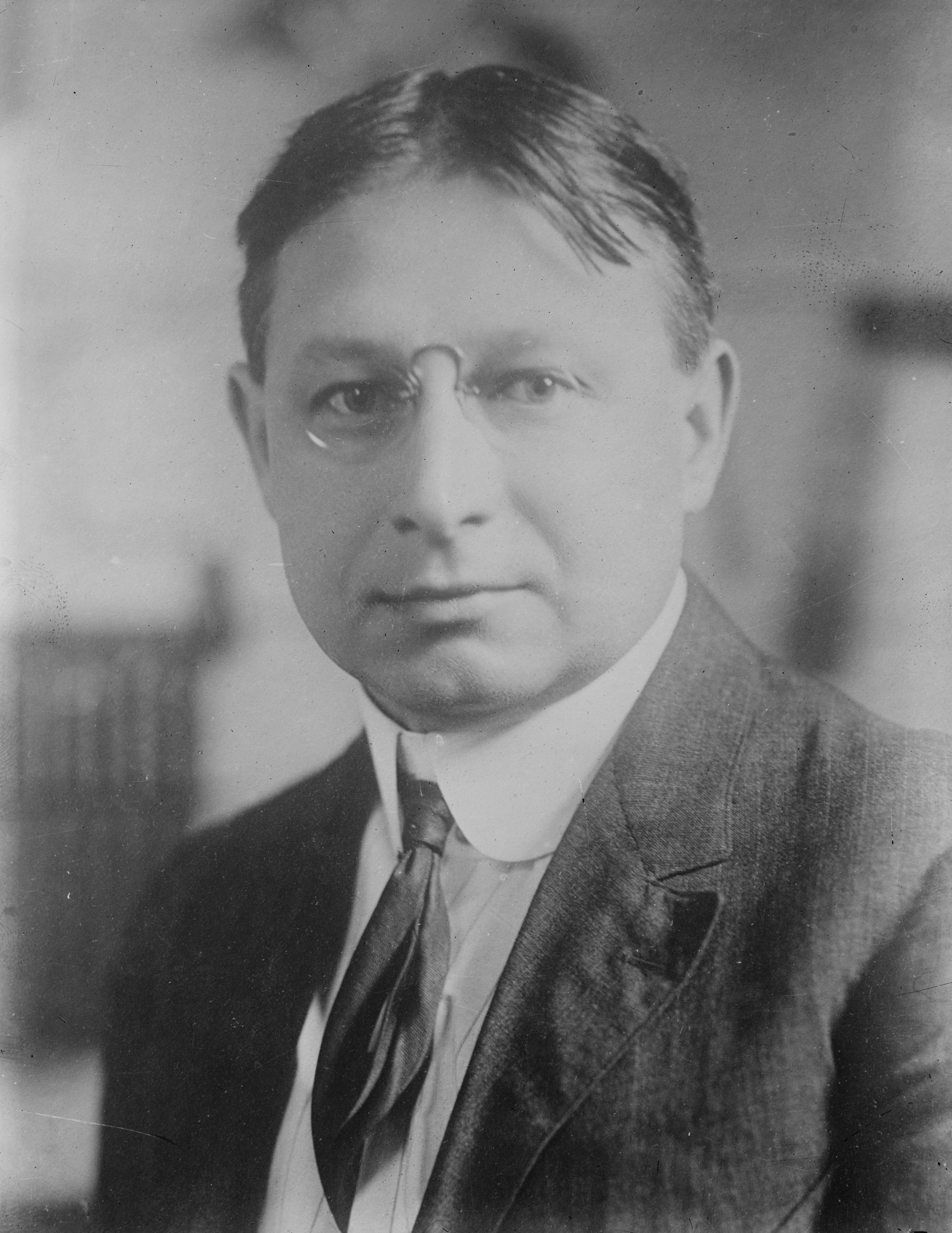
- Born: December 5, 1869; Muscatine, Iowa, U.S.
- Died: September 13, 1937 (aged 67); Williamsville, Massachusetts, U.S.
- Resting place: Flushing Cemetery, New York City, U.S.
- Occupation: Author
- Writing career
- Notable work: "Pigs Is Pigs" (1905)

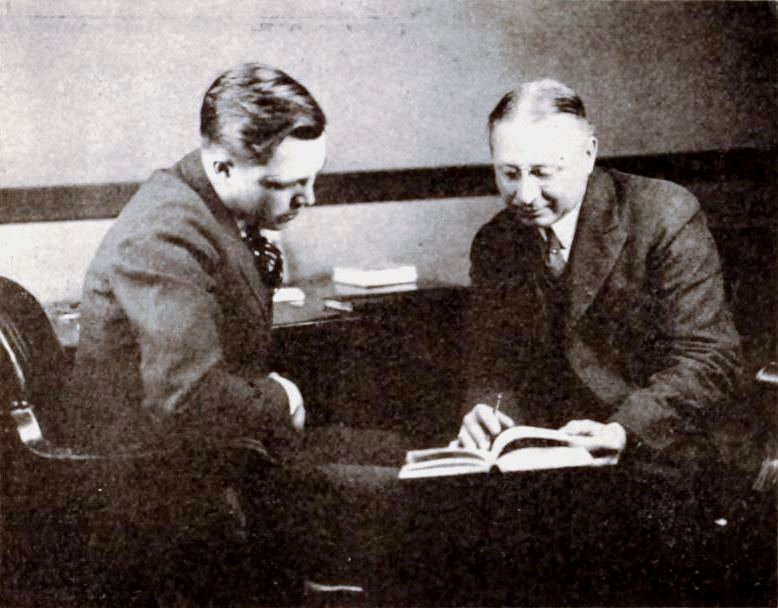
Director King Vidor and Butler discussing The Jack-Knife Man, which was being filmed in 1920

Ellis Parker Butler (December 5, 1869 – September 13, 1937) was an American author. He was the author of more than 30 books and more than 2,000 stories and essays and is most famous for his short story "Pigs Is Pigs", in which a bureaucratic stationmaster insists on levying the livestock rate for a shipment of two pet guinea pigs, which soon start proliferating exponentially. His most famous character was Philo Gubb.

His career spanned more than forty years, and his stories, poems, and articles were published in more than 225 magazines. His work appeared alongside that of his contemporaries, including Mark Twain, Sax Rohmer, James B. Hendryx, Berton Braley, F. Scott Fitzgerald, Don Marquis, Will Rogers, and Edgar Rice Burroughs.

Despite the enormous volume of his work, Butler was, for most of his life, only a part-time author. He worked full-time as a banker and was very active in his local community. A founding member of both the Dutch Treat Club and the Authors League of America, Butler was an always-present force in the New York City literary scene.

== Early life and education ==
Butler was born in Muscatine, Iowa, on December 5, 1869. He attended Muscatine High School for one year.

== Career ==
He moved to New York City and lived in Flushing (Queens) New York.

He wrote twenty-five stories for Woman's Home Companion between 1906 and 1935. The stories in the Companion were illustrated by artists including May Wilson Preston, Frederic Dorr Steele, Herbert Paus and Rico Le Brun.

Between 1931 and 1936, at least seventeen of Butler's stories published in newspapers were illustrated by Ethel Hays.

== Personal life and death ==
He died in Williamsville, Massachusetts on September 13, 1937, and was interred in Flushing Cemetery.
