= Dolly of the Dailies =

1914 film

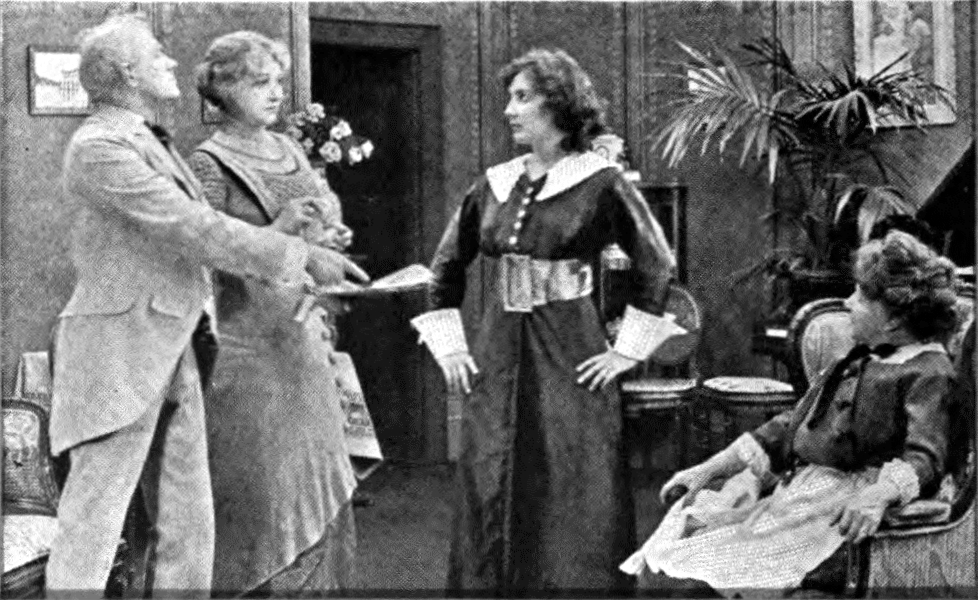
- A scene from Episode One
- Directed by: Walter Edwin
- Written by: Acton Davies
- Starring: Mary Fuller; Yale Boss
- Release date: January 31, 1914
- Running time: 12 episodes
- Country: United States
- Language: Silent with English intertitles

The Chinese Fan

Dolly of the Dailies (also referred to as The Active Life of Dolly of the Dailies) is a 1914 American drama film serial directed by Walter Edwin. The serial was considered to be lost in its entirety, until a copy of the fifth episode was discovered in the New Zealand Film Archive in 2010. The rediscovered fifth episode was preserved by the Academy Film Archive in 2011. The British Film Institute's National Film and Television Archive has a copy of episode 10.

== Cast ==
- Mary Fuller as Dolly Desmond
- Yale Boss
- Gladys Hulette
- Charles Ogle
- Harry Beaumont
- William West
- Edwin Clarke
- Richard Neill (as Richard Neil)
- Miriam Nesbitt
- Dan Mason

== Episodes ==
1. The Perfect Truth
2. The Ghost of Mother Eve
3. An Affair of Dress
4. Putting One Over
5. The Chinese Fan
6. On The Heights
7. The End of The Umbrella
8. A Tight Squeeze
9. A Terror of The Night
10. Dolly Plays Detective
11. Dolly At The Helm
12. The Last Assignment

== See also ==
- List of film serials
- List of film serials by studio
- List of rediscovered films
