= Herbert Paus =

American illustrator

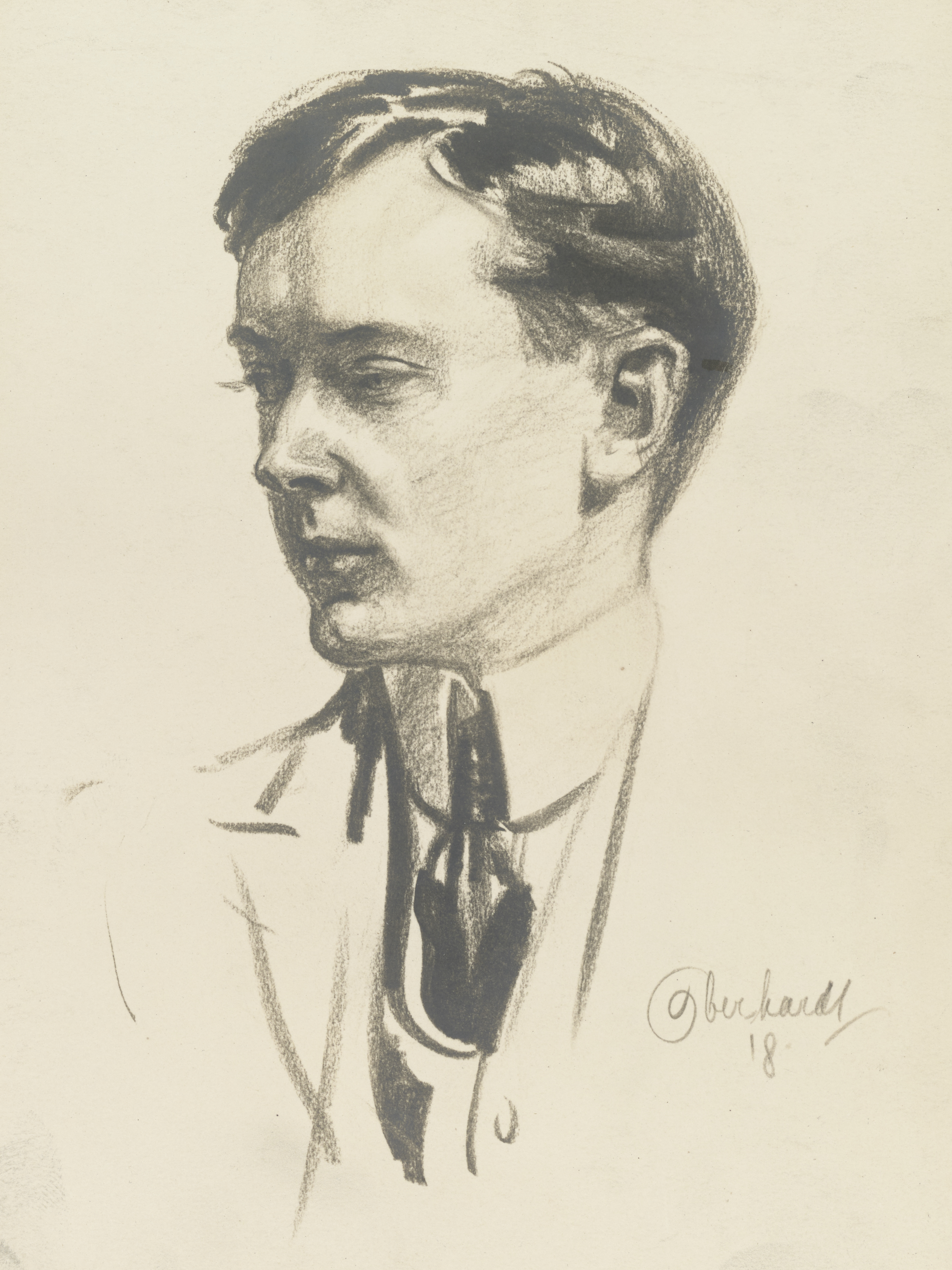
Herbert Paus

Herbert Andrew Paus (1860 – 1946) was an American illustrator who was inducted into the Society of Illustrators Hall of Fame in 2005. He was particularly associated with the magazine Popular Science, for whom he produced all the covers from mid-1927 to early 1931.
