= Gubb (application) =

gubb was a Web-based list application that required no downloaded software. With gubb, users could create, manage and share an unlimited number of lists. gubb also offered a fully functional mobile Web application.

gubb was created in 2006 by former White House intern and Walt Disney Company executive Josh Weinstein and Peppercoin founding member Joe Bergeron. As of July 2022, the website appeared to be defunct.
