= Pigs Is Pigs =

Story by Ellis Parker Butler

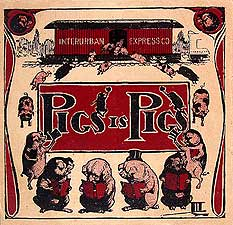
Pigs is Pigs cover when published in 1905 by Railway Appliances Company (Chicago) without permission. Most copies were destroyed.

"Pigs Is Pigs" is a story by American writer Ellis Parker Butler. First published as a short story in American Illustrated Magazine in September 1905, "Pigs Is Pigs" went on to dozens of printings as a book and in anthologies over the next several decades.

== Plot ==
Railway agent Mike Flannery wants to charge the livestock rate for a shipment of two guinea pigs and refuses to accept the lower pet rate, saying "pigs is pigs." Flannery believes that the "guinea" is an indication of the pigs' national origin. He argues that they should bear the higher freight charge of 30¢ for livestock, rather than the lower 25¢ for domestic pets. In support of this, he submits that if they were "dago pigs" or "Irish pigs," there would be no question of the animals' status.

Because the customer refuses to accept delivery, Flannery is forced to feed and house what he now calls the "dago pigs" in his office. When he eventually receives instructions to accept the lower price, he discovers that the customer has moved. He is then instructed by his superiors to return the pigs to the company warehouse. By this time, the guinea pigs have reproduced exponentially in Flannery's station house. After returning all the descendants, Flannery resolves to charge the lower rate for any future livestock.

== Adaptations ==
The story was made into movie form several times, including the Walt Disney cartoon in 1954 that was nominated for an Academy Award for Animated Short Film. The 1937 Merrie Melodies cartoon Pigs Is Pigs, directed by Friz Freleng, is not an adaptation of the Butler story.

- Pigs Is Pigs (1910)
- Pigs Is Pigs (1914) directed by George D. Baker
- They Say Pigs Is Pigs (1917) animated cartoon by Harry Palmer
- Pigs Is Pigs a 1954 cartoon (non-official Silly Symphony) directed by Jack Kinney

== Inspiration of other works ==
The rapid reproduction of the guinea pigs and their near overrunning of a facility is mirrored by the Martian flat cats in the Robert A. Heinlein novel The Rolling Stones. Heinlein admitted he took inspiration from Butler but never plagiarized him. In a note to David Gerrold over the similarity of Star Trek's tribbles to his flat cats, Gerrold claims that Heinlein wrote to him, “we both owe something to Ellis Parker Butler...and possibly to Noah.”
