= Marc McDermott =

Australian-American actor (1871–1929)

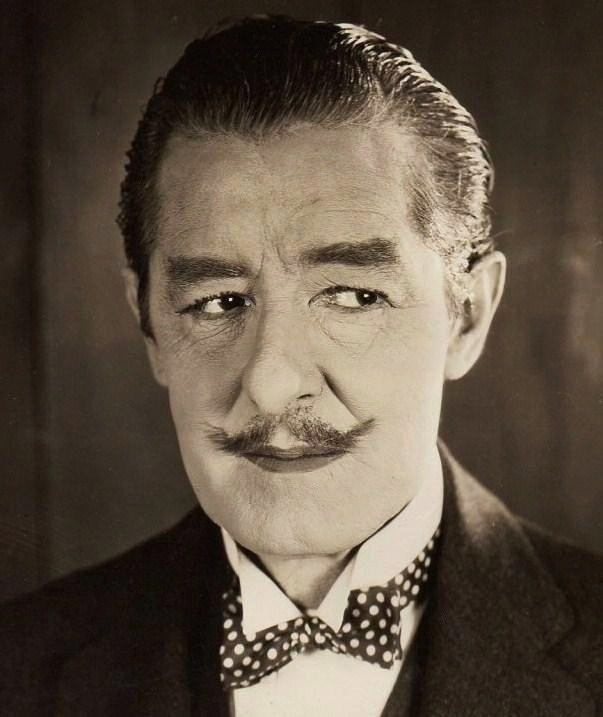
- McDermott, c. 1925
- Born: Marcus McDermott; 24 July 1871; Goulburn, New South Wales, Australia
- Died: 5 January 1929 (aged 57); Glendale, California, U.S.
- Resting place: Forest Lawn Memorial Park Cemetery, Glendale
- Years active: 1900–1929
- Spouse: Miriam Nesbitt

Marcus McDermott (24 July 1871 – 5 January 1929) was an Australian actor who starred on Broadway and in over 180 American films from 1909 until his death. He was sometimes credited as Marc MacDermott.

== Early life and career ==
McDermott was born in Goulburn, New South Wales to Irish parents and he attended Saint Ignatius' College, Riverview in Sydney. Later, while working as a hairdresser in central Sydney, McDermott took an active interest in amateur theatricals. In 1899 he was discovered by illustrious stage actor George Rignold, and he traveled on an extended Australian tour with Rignold's company. In mid-1902 McDermott traveled to New York via Canada, joining Mrs Patrick Campbell’s a company soon after and appearing on Broadway, as Sir George Orreyed in The Second Mrs. Tanqeray. In mid-1903 he traveled to England with Campbell and performed there until 1906 when he returned to the United States, his reputation by now well established.

McDermott got his first taste of the American film industry when he was hired by Thomas Edison in 1909 to appear as a featured player at Edison's Bronx studio, in replacement of Maurice Costello, who had moved to Vitagraph, the first motion picture stock company ever formed. McDermott was then picked for a role in Les Misérables, acting with Maurice Costello and William V. Ranous. Later that year, he acted in 1909 short Lochinvar, based on the story by Sir Walter Scott. That movie was released before Les Misérables, but he filmed the movie after Lochinvar. The next year, McDermott was cast as Ebenezer Scrooge in the short seventeen-minute silent film adaptation of Charles Dickens' work, A Christmas Carol. In 1912, McDermott starred with Mary Fuller and Charles Ogle in What Happened to Mary?, the first motion picture serial made in the U.S. The Edison Studios production consisted of twelve one-reel episodes released monthly starting on 26 July 1912 to coincide with the serial of the same name published in McClure's Ladies' World magazine.

Two years later, McDermott appeared as the lead in The Man Who Disappeared, another popular ten-chapter series that also was featured in magazines just as each chapter appeared on the screen. McDermott had starred in over 140 films for Edison by 1916, and had frequently appeared in popular film magazines like Photoplay and Moving Picture World. That year, on 20 April, McDermott married stage actress Miriam Nesbitt, who later co-starred with him in many films such as The Man Who Disappeared. McDermott then left Edison Studios to join Vitagraph Studios. For the next decade, McDermott spent his time starring in minor and major roles in dozens of movies.

== Death ==
McDermott died at the age of 57 on 5 January 1929 of cirrhosis of the liver, during surgery to treat the condition. He was entombed in Glendale's Forest Lawn Memorial Park Cemetery.

== Partial filmography ==
- Les Misérables (1909)
- A Christmas Carol (1910) as Ebenezer Scrooge
- How Spriggins Took Lodgers (1911)
- An Island Comedy (1911)
- What Happened to Mary? (1912)
- The Passer-By (1912)
- The Librarian (1912, Short)
- Who Will Marry Mary? (1913)
- The Man Who Disappeared (1914)
- Eugene Aram (1915)
- The Mystery of Room 13 (1915)
- The Price of Fame (1916)
- Whom the Gods Destroy (1916)
- Builders of Castles (1917)
- The Last Sentence (1917)
- An Alabaster Box (1917)
- Babette (1917)
- Mary Jane's Pa (1917)
- The Sixteenth Wife (1917)
- The Woman Between Friends (1918)
- The Thirteenth Chair (1919)
- The New Moon (1919)
- Kathleen Mavourneen (1919)
- Even as Eve (1920) - O'Hara
- While New York Sleeps (1920)
- Blind Wives (1920)
- Footlights (1921)
- Miss 139 (1921)
- The Spanish Jade (1922)
- The Lights of New York (1922)
- Lucretia Lombard (1923)
- Hoodman Blind (1923)
- The Satin Girl (1923)
- Dorothy Vernon of Haddon Hall (1924)
- The Sea Hawk (1924)
- He Who Gets Slapped (1924)
- In Every Woman's Life (1924)
- Three Miles Out (1924)
- Siege (1925)
- Graustark (1925)
- Flesh and the Devil (1926)
- The Temptress (1926)
- The Taxi Dancer (1927)
- Resurrection (1927)
- California (1927)
- The Road to Romance (1927)
- Man, Woman and Sin (1927)
- Under the Black Eagle (1928)
- Glorious Betsy (1928)
- Yellow Lily (1928)
- The Whip (1928)
