= The Innocence of Ruth =

1916 silent film

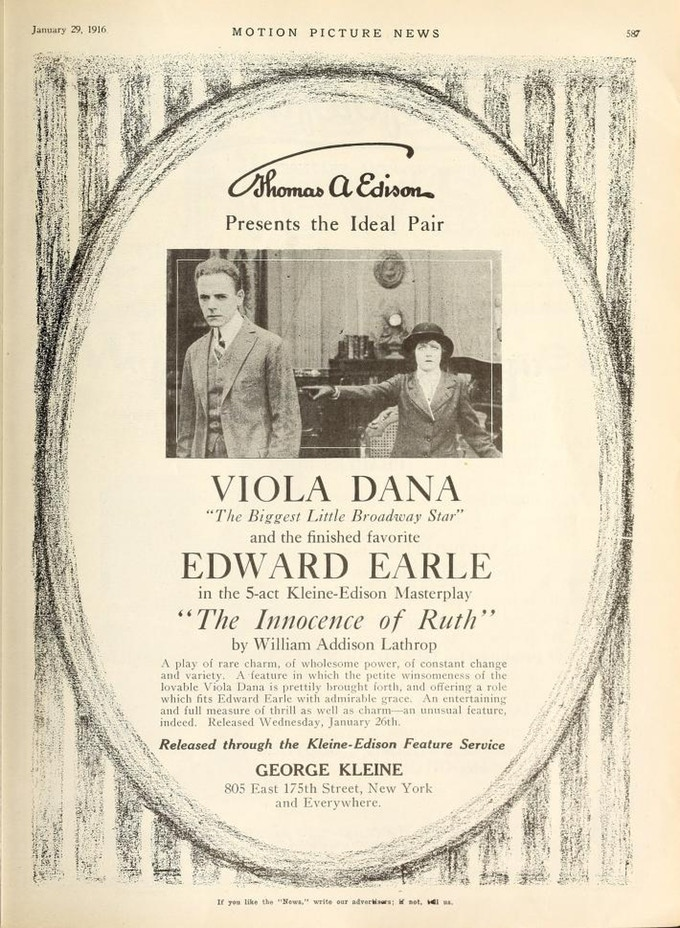
- Directed by: John H. Collins
- Written by: William Addison Lathrop
- Starring: Edward Earle; Viola Dana; Augustus Phillips
- Production company: Edison Pictures
- Distributed by: Kleine-Edison Feature Services
- Release date: January 26, 1916
- Running time: 50 minutes
- Country: United States
- Language: Silent (English intertitles)

The Innocence of Ruth (1916) by John H. Collins

The Innocence of Ruth is a 1916 American silent drama film directed by John H. Collins and starring Edward Earle, Viola Dana, and Augustus Phillips.

== Cast ==
- Edward Earle as Jimmy Carter
- Viola Dana as Ruth Travers
- Augustus Phillips as Mortimer Reynolds
- Lena Davril as Edna Morris
- T. Tamamoto as Togo
- Brad Sutton as Mr. Travers
- Nellie Grant as Housekeeper
- Robert Brower as Stock Broker

== Bibliography ==
- John T. Weaver. Twenty Years of Silents, 1908-1928. Scarecrow Press, 1971.
