= Frankenstein (1910 film) =

1910 film

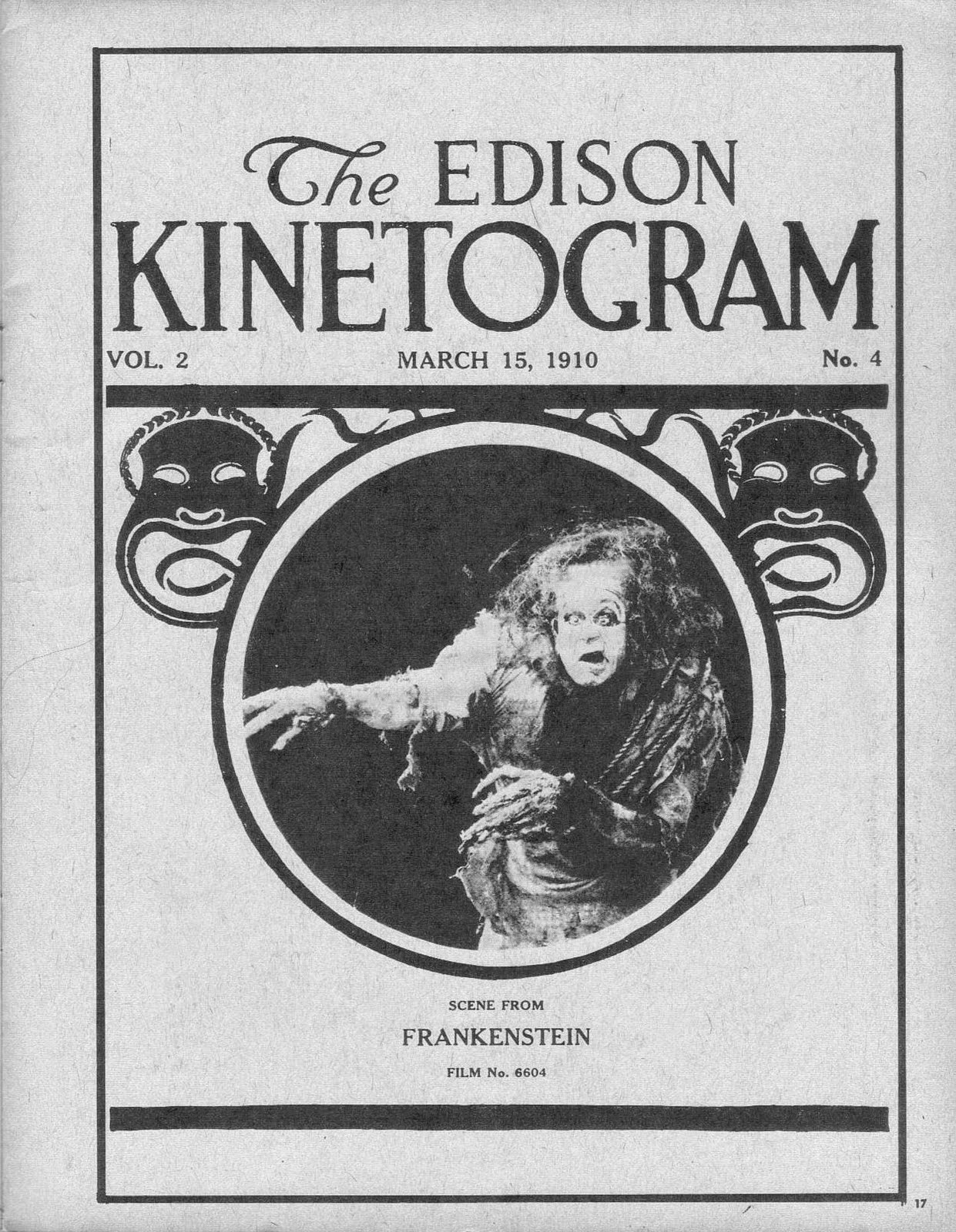
- Cover of a 1910 The Edison Kinetogram film catalog, featuring the first motion picture adaptation of Mary Shelley's Frankenstein; or, The Modern Prometheus.
- Directed by: J. Searle Dawley
- Written by: J. Searle Dawley
- Based on: Frankenstein; or, The Modern Prometheus (1818 novel) by Mary Shelley
- Produced by: Thomas Edison
- Starring: Augustus Phillips; Charles Ogle; Mary Fuller
- Cinematography: James White
- Production company: Edison Manufacturing Company
- Distributed by: Edison Manufacturing Company
- Release date: March 18, 1910
- Running time: 16 minutes (1 reel, 975 feet)
- Country: United States
- Language: Silent with English intertitles

Frankenstein is a 1910 American short silent horror film produced by Edison Studios. It was directed by J. Searle Dawley, who also wrote the one-reeler's screenplay, broadly basing his "scenario" on Mary Shelley's 1818 novel Frankenstein; or, The Modern Prometheus. This short motion picture is generally recognized by film historians as the first screen adaptation of Shelley's work. The small cast, who are not credited in the surviving 1910 print of the film, includes Augustus Phillips as Dr. Frankenstein, Charles Ogle as Frankenstein's monster, and Mary Fuller as the doctor's fiancée.

== Plot ==
The full film

Described as "a liberal adaptation of Mrs. Shelley's famous story", the film shows young Frankenstein (his first name in the book, Victor, is never mentioned) discovering the "mystery of life" after two years at university. He gives life to a creature built by mixing different chemicals, and the monster follows Frankenstein back to his parents' house. The conclusion, completely different from Mary Shelley's book, shows the creature disappearing after seeing its own reflection in the mirror, and without killing Victor's younger brother or his fiancée Elizabeth, as happened in the novel.

The film's plot description in a 1910 issue of the studio's trade periodical Edison Kinetogram provides considerable detail about the company's screen adaptation:

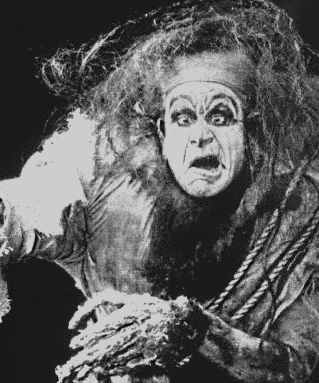
Detail of monster featured on cover of the Edison Kinetogram, April 15, 1910

Frankenstein, a young student, is seen bidding his sweetheart and father goodbye, as he is leaving home to enter a college in order to study the sciences. Shortly after his arrival at college he becomes absorbed in the mysteries of life and death to the extent of forgetting practically everything else. His great ambition is to create a human being, and finally one night his dream is realized. He is convinced that he has found a way to create the most perfect human being that the world has ever seen. We see his experiment commence and the development of it. The formation of the hideous monster from the blazing chemicals of a huge cauldron in Frankenstein's laboratory is probably the most weird, mystifying and fascinating scene ever shown on a film. To Frankenstein's horror, instead of creating a marvel of physical beauty and grace, there is unfolded before his eyes and before the audience an awful, ghastly, abhorrent monster. As he realizes what he has done, Frankenstein rushes from the room, only to have the misshapen monster peer at him through the curtains of his bed. He falls fainting to the floor, where he is found by his servant, who revives him.

After a few weeks' illness, he returns home, a broken, weary man, but under the loving care of father and sweetheart he regains his health and strength and begins to take a less morbid view of life. In other words, the story of the film brings out the fact that the creation of the monster was only possible because Frankenstein had allowed his normal mind to be overcome by evil and unnatural thoughts. His marriage is soon to take place. But one evening, while sitting in his library, he chances to glance in the mirror before him and sees the reflection of the monster which has just opened the door of his room. All the terror of the past comes over him and, fearing lest his sweetheart should learn the truth, he bids the monster conceal himself behind the curtain while he hurriedly induces his sweetheart, who then comes in, to stay only a moment. Then follows a strong, dramatic scene. The monster, who is following his creator with the devotion of a dog, is insanely jealous of anyone else. He snatches from Frankenstein's coat the rose which his sweetheart has given him, and in the struggle throws Frankenstein to the floor. Here the monster looks up and for the first time confronts his own reflection in the mirror. Appalled and horrified at his own image he flees in terror from the room. Not being able, however, to live apart from his creator, he again comes to the house on the wedding night and, searching for the cause of his jealousy, goes into the bride's room. Frankenstein, coming into the main room, hears a shriek of terror, which is followed a moment after by his bride rushing in and falling in a faint at his feet. The monster then enters and after overpowering Frankenstein's feeble efforts by a slight exercise of his gigantic strength leaves the house.

Here comes the point which we have endeavored to bring out, namely: That when Frankenstein's love for his bride shall have attained full strength and freedom from impurity it will have such an effect upon his mind that the monster cannot exist. This theory is clearly demonstrated in the next and closing scene, which has probably never been surpassed in anything shown on the moving picture screen. The monster, broken down by his unsuccessful attempts to be with his creator, enters the room, stands before a large mirror and holds out his arms entreatingly. Gradually, the real monster fades away, leaving only the image in the mirror. A moment later Frankenstein himself enters. As he stands directly before the mirror we are amazed to see the image of the monster reflected instead of Frankenstein's own. Gradually, however, under the effect of love and his better nature, the monster's image fades and Frankenstein sees himself in his young manhood in the mirror. His bride joins him, and the film ends with their embrace, Frankenstein's mind now being relieved of the awful terror and weight it has been laboring under for so long.

== Cast ==
- Mary Fuller as Elizabeth
- Charles Stanton Ogle as The Monster
- Augustus Phillips as Frankenstein
- Brook Maddox as Henry

== Production ==
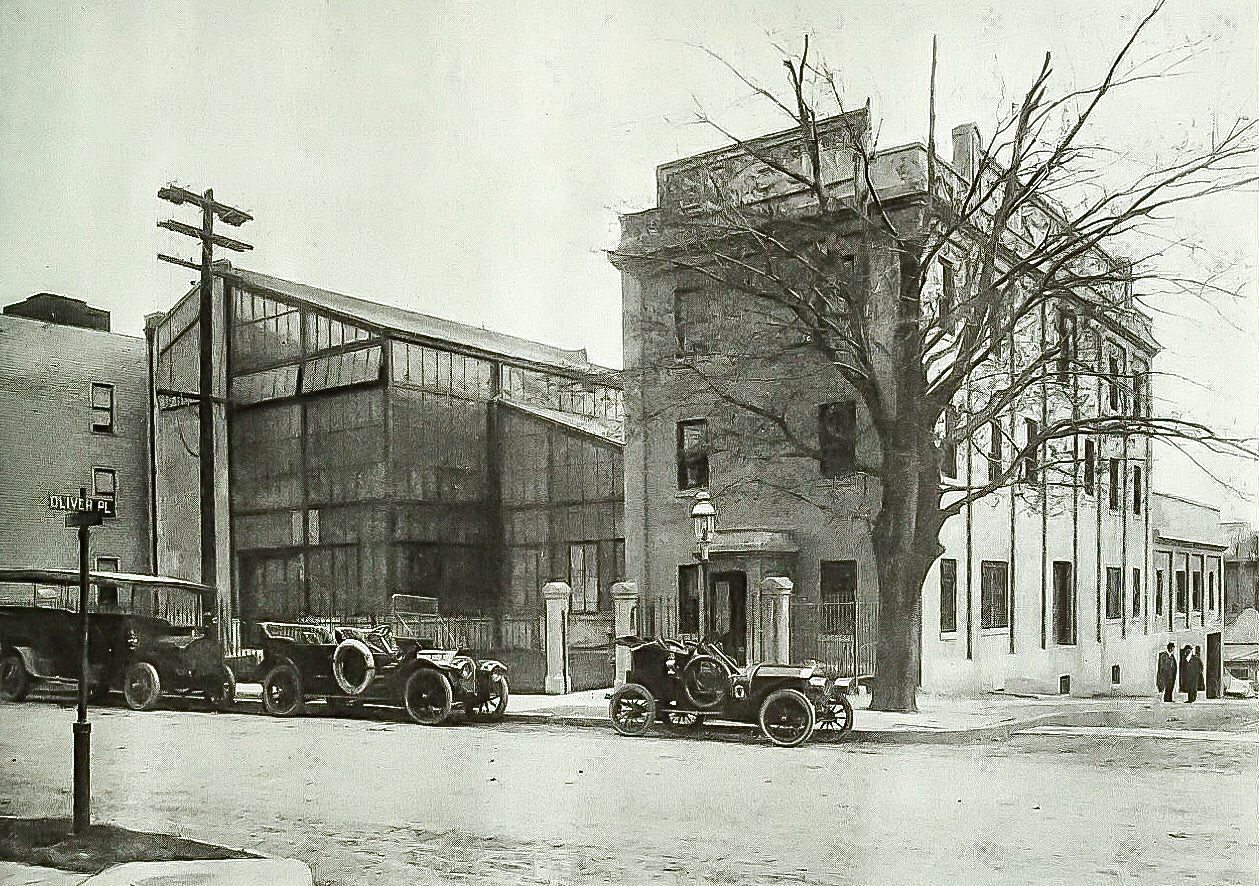
Frankenstein was filmed at Edison Studios in the Bronx, New York.

J. Searle Dawley, working in his third year for Edison Studios, shot the film in three days at the company's Bronx facilities in New York City on January 13, 15 and 17, 1910. Staff writers for the Edison Kinetogram assured theatergoers in 1910 that the company's film adaptation was deliberately designed to de-emphasize the horrific aspects of Shelley's story and to focus instead on the tale's "mystic and psychological" elements:

In making the film the Edison Co. has carefully tried to eliminate all actual repulsive situations and to concentrate its endeavors upon the mystic and psychological problems that are to be found in this weird tale. Whenever, therefore, the film differs from the original story it is purely with the idea of elimination of what would be repulsive to a moving picture audience.

The creation of the monster scene involved the burning of a dummy while manipulating its arms and head, and then reversing the footage to show the creature taking shape from nothingness by bringing together ashes and fumes.

The film was reported in the Edison Kinetogram as having a length of 975 feet, giving it a runtime of approximately 16 minutes at silent film rates (16 FPS), or closer to eleven minutes at modern rates (24 FPS).

== Reception ==
Newspapers and magazines of the time, such as New York newspapers The Film Index and The Moving Picture World, highlighted the monster creation scene as "the most remarkable ever committed to a film". After the film's official premiere, on April 9, The Moving Picture World published a negative review signed by W. Stephen Bush, probably one of the first critics to worry about what could be shown in films:

I have the sincerest admiration for the Edison and Vitagraph studios, but it must be said, with all due deference to these distinguished producers, that such films as 'Frankenstein' and 'The Mistery of Temple Court', while delightful literature to coroners, undertakers, gravediggers, and morgue-keepers, fail to please the general public. 'Fail to please' is putting it mildly. (…) Death scenes and executions are interesting historical reading, when well described, but a portrayal of these things on a living screen may well be dispensed with.

== Music ==
Frankenstein was among the earliest silent films to have an associated cue sheet, providing suggested musical accompaniment. From the cue sheet:

At opening: Andante—"You Will Remember Me"
Till Frankenstein's laboratory: Moderato—"Melody in F"
Till monster is forming: Increasing agitato
Till monster appears over bed: Dramatic music from "Der Freischütz"
Till father and girl in sitting room: Moderato
Till Frankenstein returns home: Andante—"Annie Laurie"
Till monster enters Frankenstein's sitting room: Dramatic—"Der Freischütz"
Till girl enters with teapot: Andante—"Annie Laurie"
Till monster comes from behind curtains: Dramatic—"Der Freischütz"
Till wedding guests are leaving: Bridal Chorus from "Lohengrin"
Till monster appears: Dramatic—"Der Freischütz"
Till Frankenstein enters: Agitato
Till monster appears: Dramatic—"Der Freischütz"
Till monster vanishes into mirror: Diminishing Agitato

The pieces include "You'll Remember Me" from the 1843 opera The Bohemian Girl, the 1852 "Melody in F", "dramatic music" (presumably the "Wolf's Glen" scene) from the 1821 opera Der Freischütz, the 1835 song "Annie Laurie", and the Bridal Chorus from the 1850 opera Lohengrin.

== Rediscovery and preservation ==
For many years, it was believed a lost film. In 1963, a plot description and stills (below) were discovered published from the April 15, 1910, issue of the film catalog The Edison Kinetogram. For many years, these images were the only widely available visual record of the Charles Ogle version of the monster.

In the early 1950s, a print of this film was purchased by a Wisconsin film collector, Alois F. Dettlaff, from his mother-in-law, who also collected films. He did not realize its rarity until many years later. Its existence was first revealed in the mid-1970s. Although somewhat deteriorated, the film was in viewable condition, complete with titles and tints as seen in 1910. Dettlaff had a 35 mm preservation copy made in the late 1970s. He also issued a DVD release of 1,000 copies.

BearManor Media released the public domain film in a restored edition on March 18, 2010, alongside the novel Edison's Frankenstein, which was written by Frederick C. Wiebel Jr.

In 2016, the film society of the University of Geneva undertook its own restoration of the film, with image restoration by Julien Dumoulin and an original soundtrack by Nicolas Hafner, performed on a Wurlitzer theatre organ located at College Claparède. The restored version of the film was shown on 10 October 2016.

On November 15, 2018, in recognition of Mary Shelly's bicentennial, the Library of Congress announced via a blog post that it had completed a full restoration of the short film, having purchased the Dettlaff collection in 2014. The restoration was made available to the general public for streaming and downloading via its YouTube channel and online National Screening Room, as well as in the blog post announcing the restoration's completion. A new soundtrack was scored and performed by Donald Sosin.

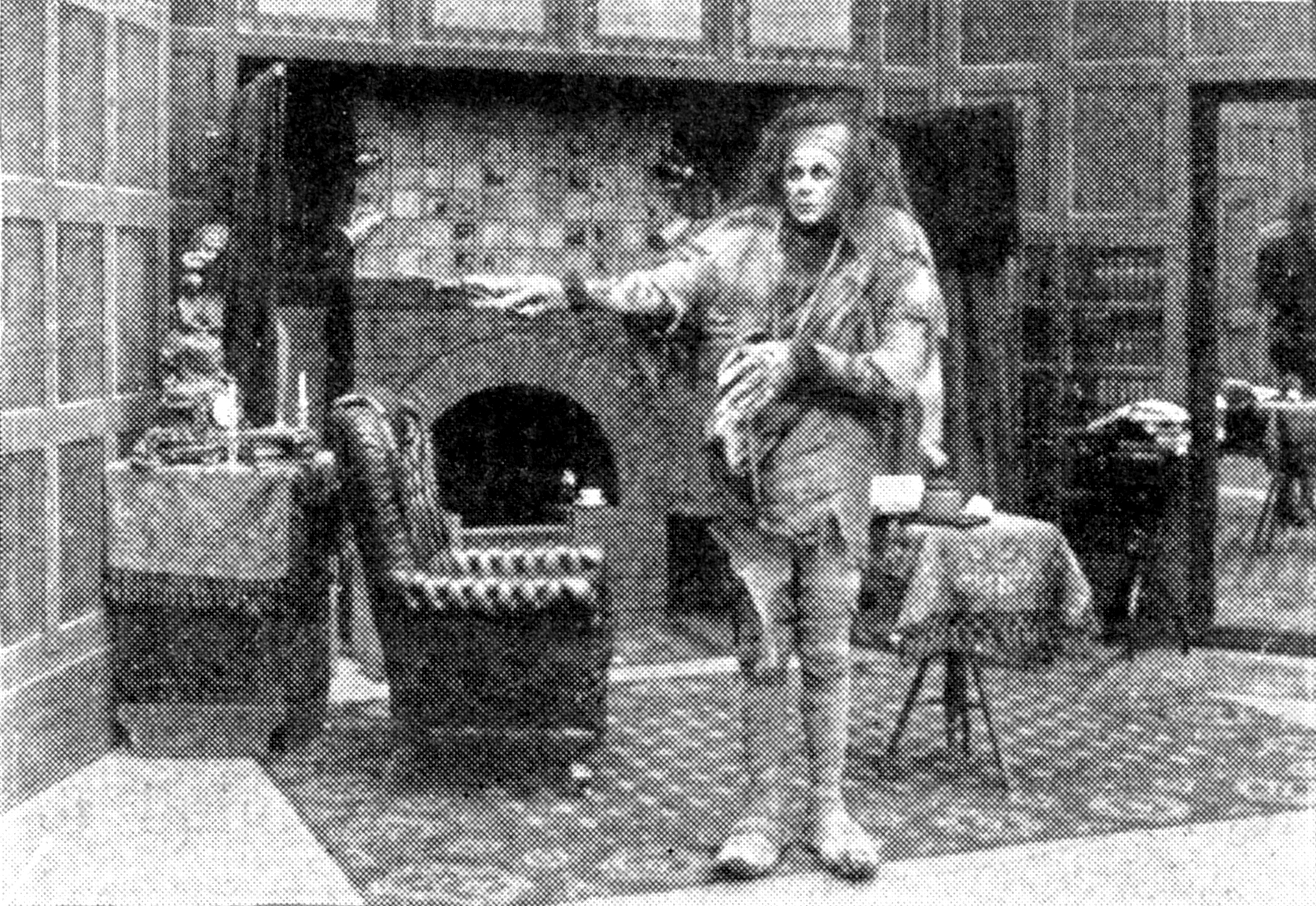
A still showing Charles Stanton Ogle as the monster.

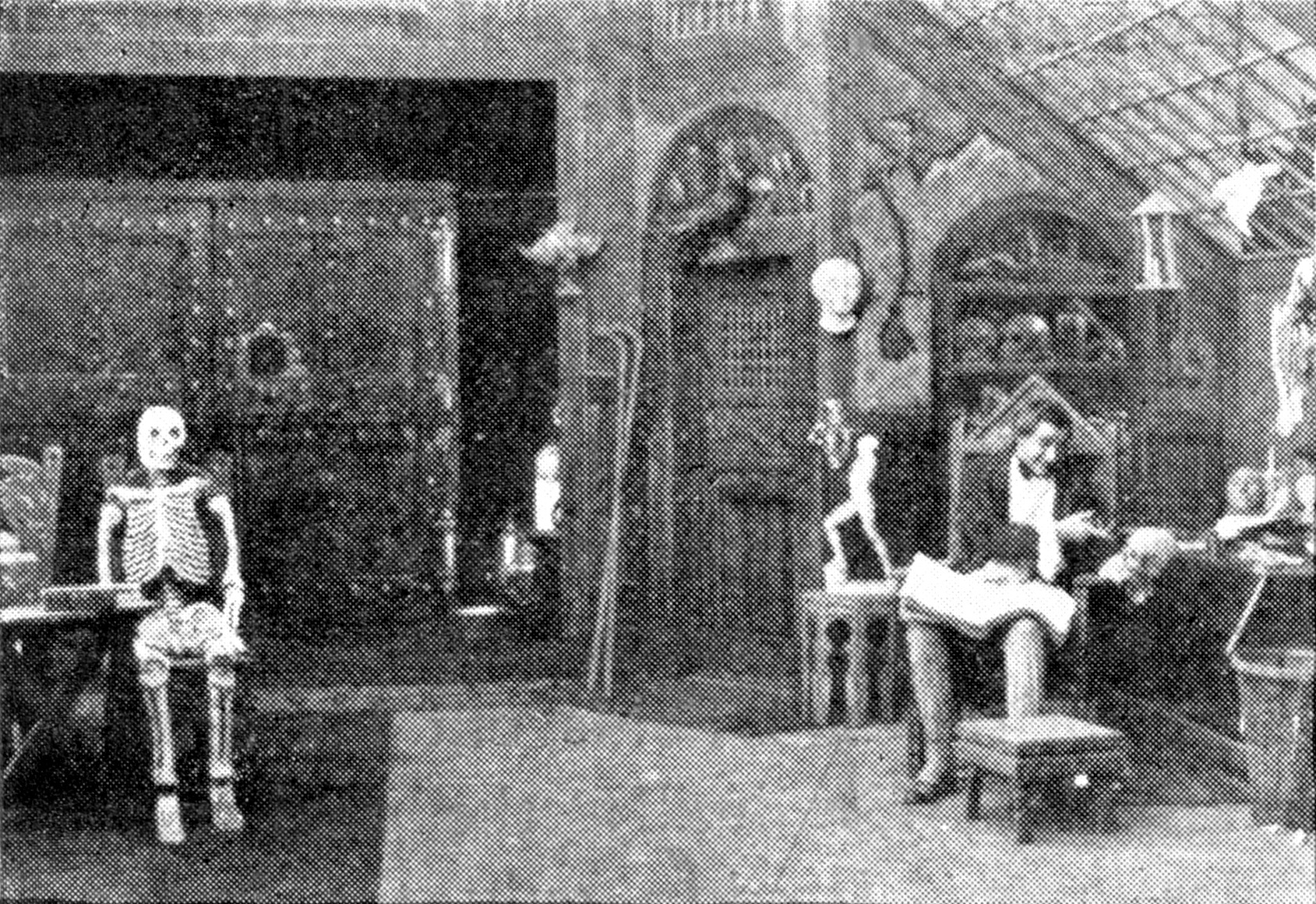
A still showing Augustus Phillips as Victor Frankenstein

== Comic book adaptation ==
In 2003 Chris Yambar and Robb Bihun published the graphic novel Edison Frankenstein 1910, directly based on the 1910 Frankenstein film adaptation.

== See also ==
- List of films featuring Frankenstein's monster
- List of American films of 1910
- List of rediscovered films
