= Something to Do =

1919 film by Donald Crisp

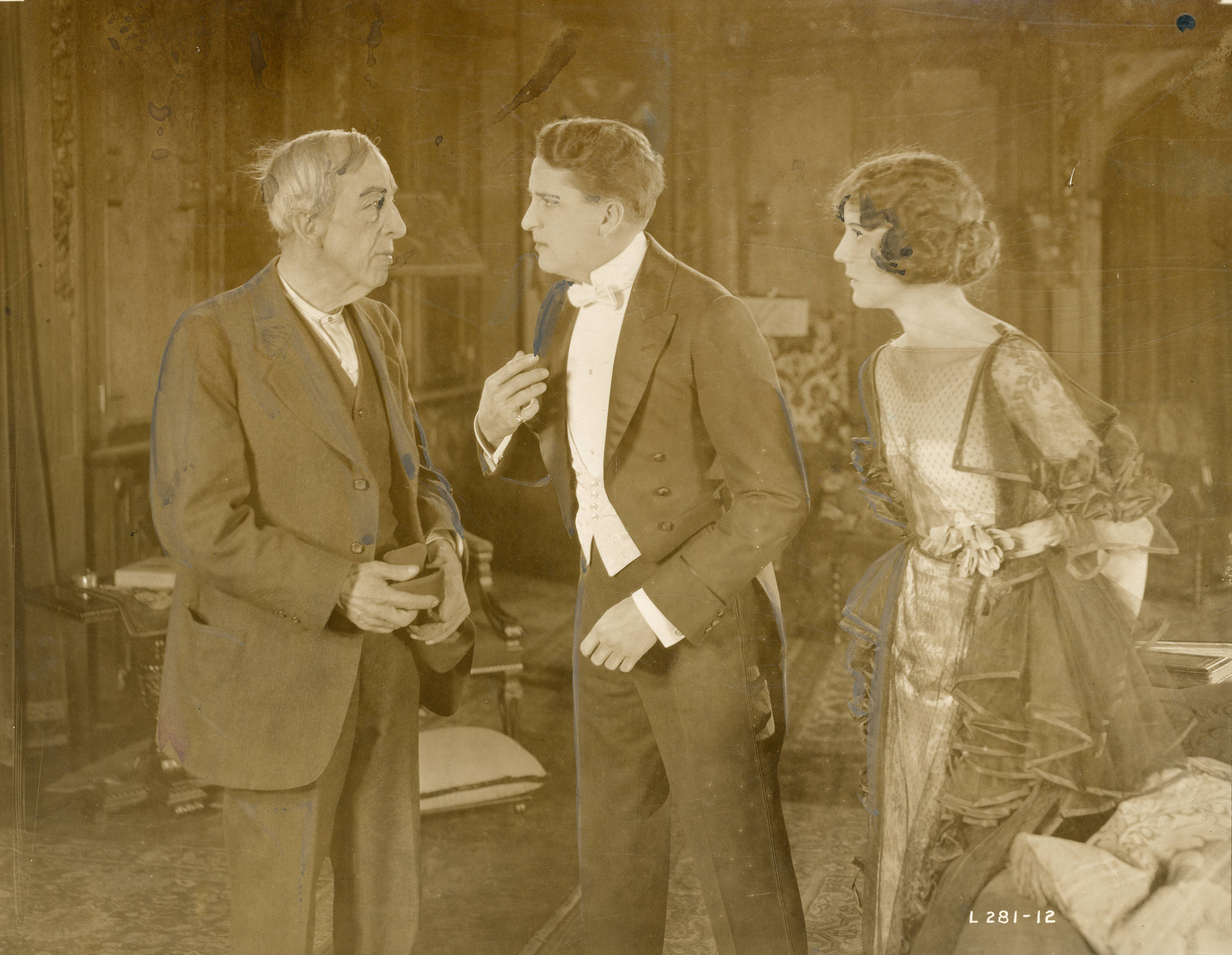
- Still with Robert Brower, Bryant Washburn, and Ann Little
- Directed by: Donald Crisp
- Screenplay by: Maximilian Foster; Will M. Ritchey
- Produced by: Jesse L. Lasky
- Starring: Bryant Washburn; Ann Little; Robert Brower; Charles K. Gerrard; Adele Farrington; Charles Ogle
- Cinematography: Charles Edgar Schoenbaum
- Production company: Famous Players–Lasky Corporation
- Distributed by: Paramount Pictures
- Release date: April 13, 1919
- Running time: 50 minutes
- Country: United States
- Language: Silent (English intertitles)

Something to Do is a lost 1919 American silent comedy film directed by Donald Crisp and written by Maximilian Foster and Will M. Ritchey. The film stars Bryant Washburn, Ann Little, Robert Brower, Charles K. Gerrard, Adele Farrington, and Charles Ogle. The film was released on April 13, 1919, by Paramount Pictures.

== Plot ==
As described in a film magazine, Jack Merrill, wealthy apostle of idleness, is advised by his physician to "find something to do" if he want to live long. His valet, posing as Lord Sidney, seeks to win the hand and fortune of newly rich Mrs. Parkin, who has had her relative Peter Remwick declared insane and confined to an asylum. Janet Remwick, his daughter, is permitted to stay on as secretary. Merrill learns of his valet's exploits and Janet's predicament, and masquerades as a nobleman to gain entry into the house. Peter Remwick escapes and returns to the house followed by his captors. Jack is instrumental in establishing Peter's sanity, proving Mrs. Parkin a crook, and winning Janet.

== Cast ==
- Bryant Washburn as Jack Merrill
- Ann Little as Janet Remwick
- Robert Brower as Mr. Remwick
- Charles K. Gerrard as Thompson
- Adele Farrington as Mrs. Parkin
- Charles Ogle as Professor Frank Blight
- James "Jim" Mason as Jose
