= The Shadow on the Blind =

- Written by: Harry Furniss
- Starring: Harry Furniss; Gertrude McCoy; Augustus Phillips; Robert Brower; Louise Sydmeth
- Distributed by: Edison
- Release date: June 8, 1912
- Running time: 1000 ft (approx.)
- Country: United States
- Languages: Silent; English intertitles

The Shadow on the Blind is a short American silent comedy produced by the Edison Company in 1912.

== Release ==
The Shadow on the Blind was released in the United States on June 8, 1912.
