= Augustus Phillips =

American actor (1874–1944)

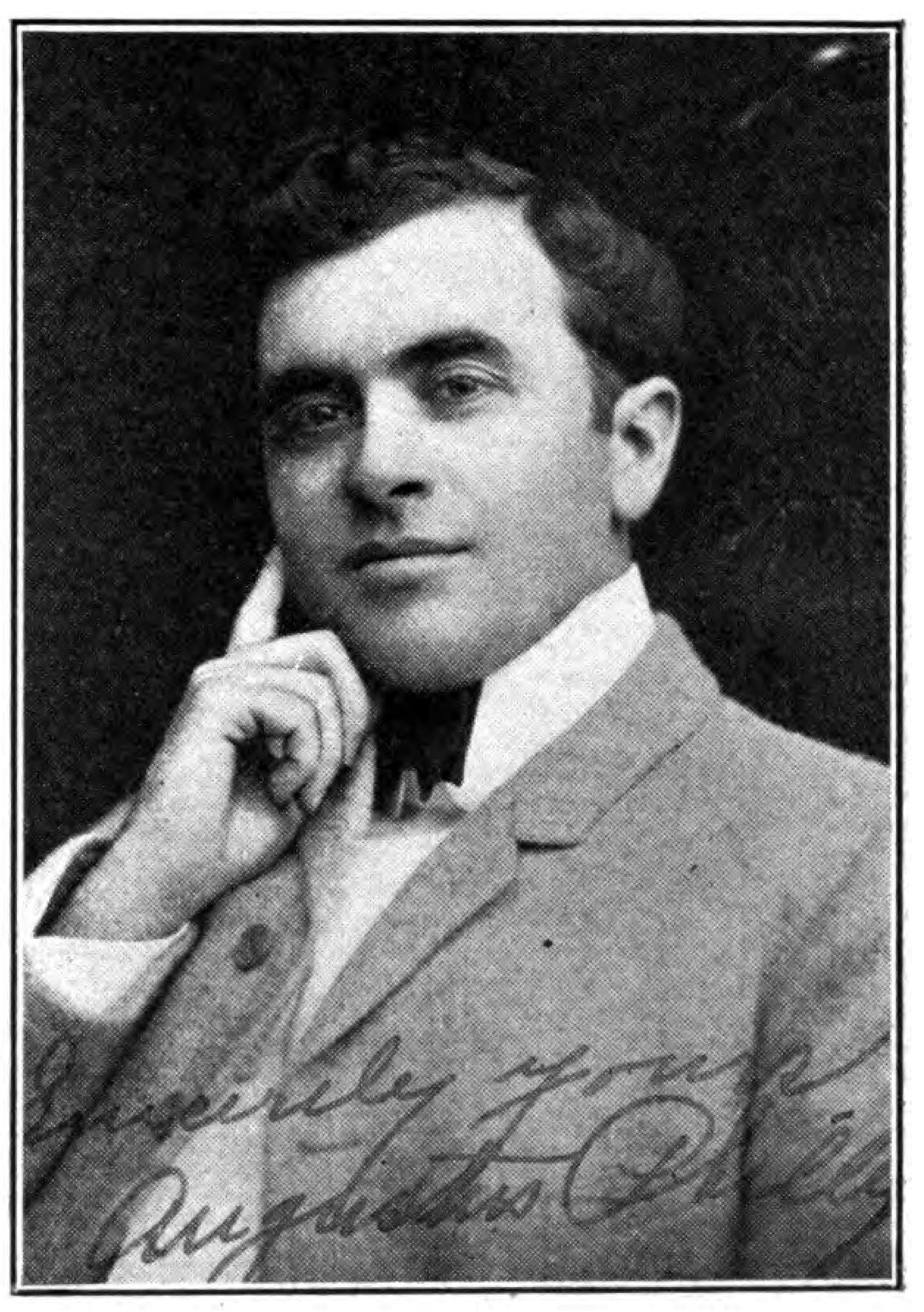
- Born: August 1, 1874; Rensselaer, Indiana, U.S.
- Died: September 29, 1944 (aged 70); London, England
- Occupation: film actor
- Years active: 1910–1921

Augustus Phillips (August 1, 1874 – September 29, 1944) was an American actor. He appeared in 134 films between 1910 and 1921.

After 11 years of performing in stock theater, vision problems led Phillips to begin acting in films for the Edison Company on January 1, 1911. He appeared in J. Searle Dawley's 1910 production of Frankenstein, playing Victor Frankenstein, as a young medical student. He was born in Rensselaer, Indiana, and died in London, England.

== Selected filmography ==
- Frankenstein (1910)
- Pigs Is Pigs (1910)
- A Soldier's Duty (1912)
- The Shadow on the Blind (1912)
- The Midnight Ride of Paul Revere (film) (1914), directed by Charles Brabin
- The Gates of Eden (1916)
- The Innocence of Ruth (1916)
- Aladdin’s Other Lamp (1917)
- The Mortal Sin (1917)
- God's Law and Man's (1917)
- Threads of Fate (1917)
- Miss Robinson Crusoe (1917)
- Lady Barnacle (1917)
- Daybreak (1918)
- The Brass Check (1918)
- Peggy Does Her Darndest (1919)
- The Grim Game (1919)
- Toby's Bow (1919)
- The Lion's Den (1919)
- One Hour Before Dawn (1920)
- The Butterfly Man (1920)
- The Unknown Wife (1921)
