= Carroll McComas =

American actress

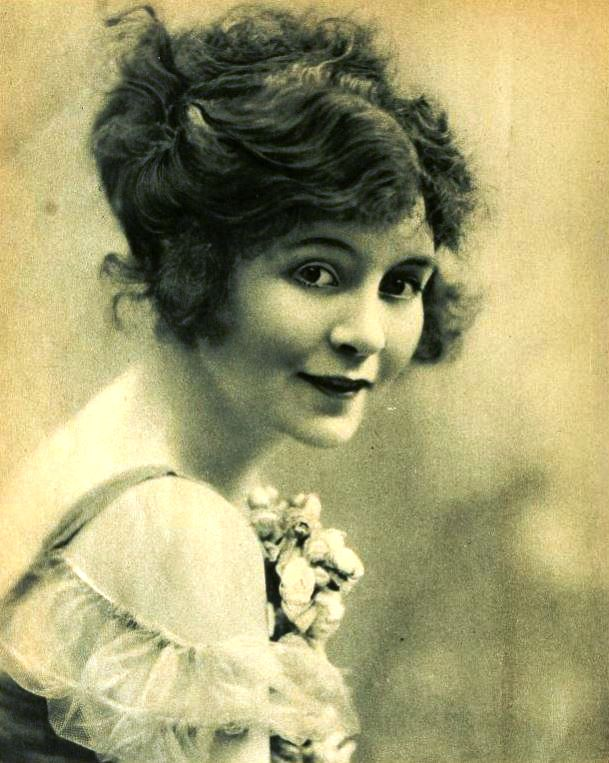
- McComas in 1920
- Born: June 27, 1886; Albuquerque, New Mexico Territory, USA
- Died: November 9, 1962 (aged 76); Greenwich Village, New York, USA
- Other name: Carol McComas
- Occupation: Actress
- Years active: 1904–1959
- Spouse(s): Walter Enright (1922–1928; divorced); Selskarr M. Gunn (1933–1944; his death)

Carroll McComas (June 27, 1886 – November 9, 1962) was an American stage, film, and television actress.

== Biography ==
Born in Albuquerque, New Mexico Territory, McComas was the daughter of Judge Charles Carroll McComas and his wife, Ellen Moore. One of her ancestors was Charles Carroll of Carrollton.

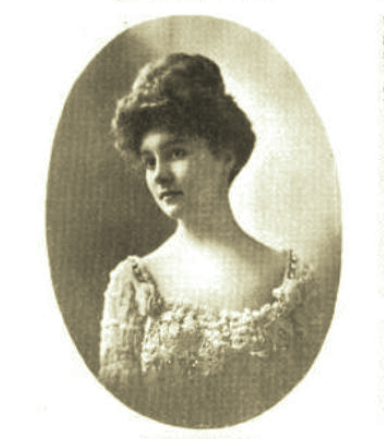
McComas in a 1907 publication.

McComas started whistling as a girl, and later started singing. In 1907, McComas debuted on stage. During a weekend, she performed a whistling act at the Orpheum Theatre in Los Angeles, but she returned to school after that Monday's first matinee. She became a dancer, singer, and whistler in vaudeville, with whistling as her specialty. She performed as a whistler in London and on a tour of South Africa.

She went on to play more than two dozen roles on Broadway . In 1918, she played May Barber in the Princess Theatre musical Oh, Lady! Lady!! by Jerome Kern, Guy Bolton and P. G. Wodehouse. Her greatest personal stage triumphs were as the title character in Miss Lulu Bett, by Zona Gale, in the 1920–21 season and as Roxane in Cyrano de Bergerac in the 1923–24 season. Her last Broadway role was in 1950 as Catherine Petkoff in Arms and the Man.

She made her silent movie debut in 1916 in When Love Is King, a still extant film. Her second and last silent film came in 1920 in Jack Straw.This movie still survives. Other films in which she appeared included The Miracle Worker. She also appeared on television.

In 1922, McComas married cartoonist Walter Enright; they divorced in 1928.

McComas interrupted her acting career after marrying Selskar M Gunn, a vice president of the Rockefeller Foundation in 1933. Gunn died in 1944 and McComas returned to the stage in 1950 and to film in 1953 to play a supporting role in Jamaica Run where she appeared as the mother of Wendell Corey and Arlene Dahl.

On November 9, 1962, McComas died at her home in The Greenwich Village neighborhood of Manhattan, New York, aged 76.

== Theater ==
- You Can't Win (1926)

== Partial filmography ==
- When Love Is King (1916)
- Jack Straw (1920)
- Jamaica Run (1953)
- Chicago Syndicate (1955)
