= When Love Is King =

- Directed by: Ben Turbett
- Written by: Charles Sumner Williams
- Produced by: Thomas A. Edison, Inc.
- Starring: Richard Tucker; Carroll McComas
- Distributed by: Edison Company
- Release date: February 9, 1916
- Running time: 5 reels
- Country: USA
- Language: Silent (English intertitles)

When Love Is King is a 1916 American silent film comedy drama, that was produced and distributed by Thomas A. Edison, Inc. in conjunction with George Kleine. The film is a starring debut for stage actress Carroll McComas.

The film is preserved at the Library of Congress.

== Cast ==
- Richard Tucker - Felix, the King
- Carroll McComas - Marcia Morton
- Bigelow Cooper - J.P. Morton
- Vivian Perry - The Princess Louise
- John Sturgeon - The Prince of Trebizond
- Harold Meltzer - Baron Tarnow
- Carlton S. King - Stepan (as Carlton King)
- T. Tamamoto - Janzi
- Robert Brower - The Prime Minister
- Charles Sutton - The Ambassador
- Guido Colucci - The Viscount
- Helen Strickland - Mrs. Morton
- Lucille Allen - The Countess Irma
- James Harris
