= Charles Stanton Ogle =

American actor (1865–1940)

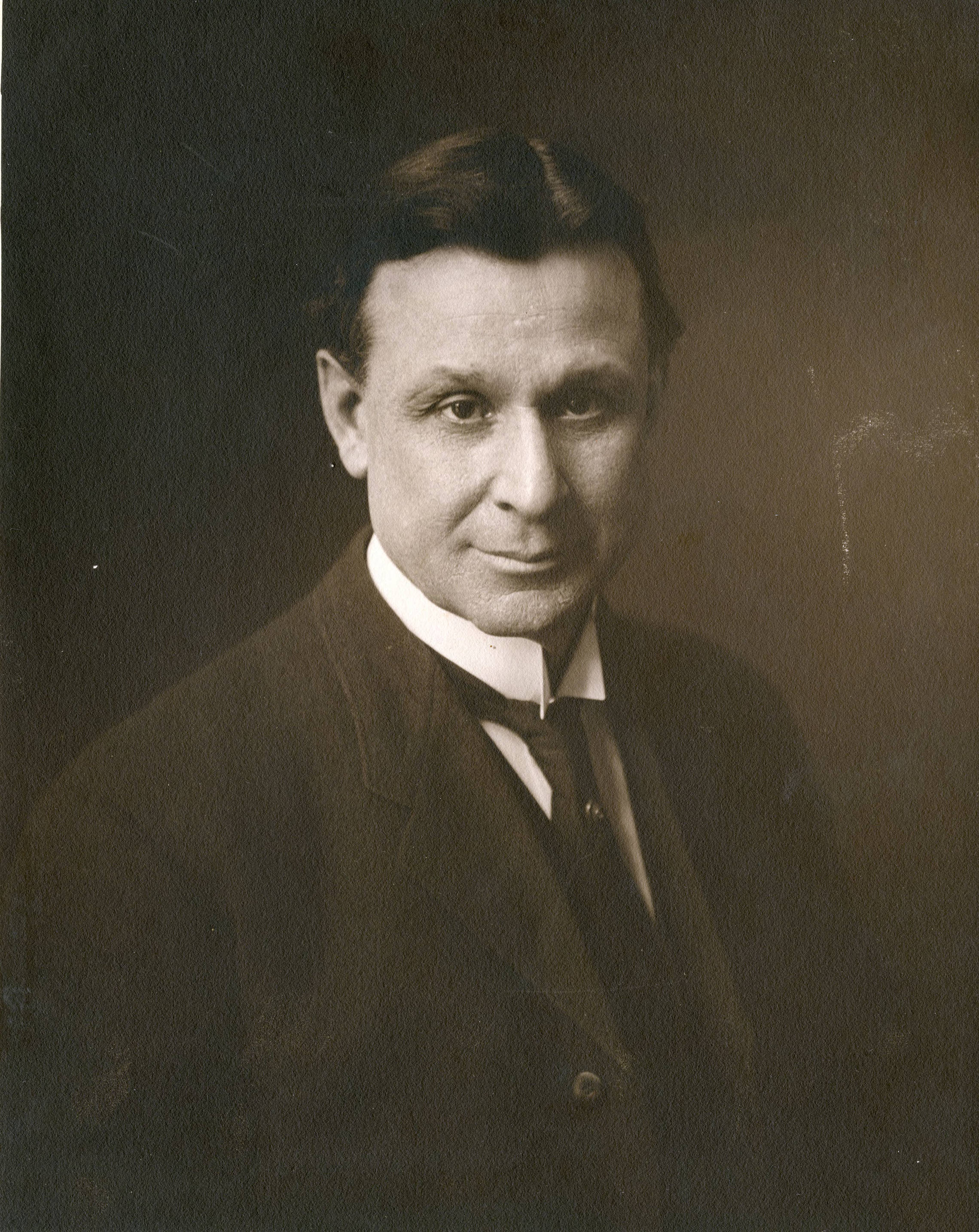
- Ogle in 1911
- Born: Charles Stanton Ogle; June 5, 1865; Steubenville, Ohio, U.S.
- Died: October 11, 1940 (aged 75); Long Beach, California, U.S.
- Resting place: Forest Lawn Memorial Park, Glendale
- Education: University of Illinois College of Law
- Occupations: Actor and lawyer
- Years active: 1905–1926
- Spouse: Ethel Pauline Green

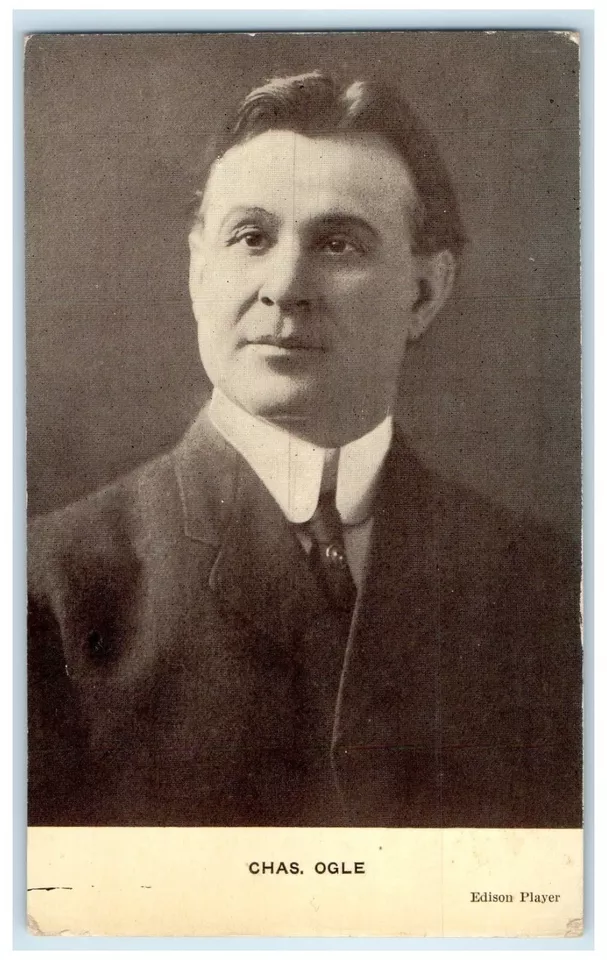
Charles Ogle in 1912

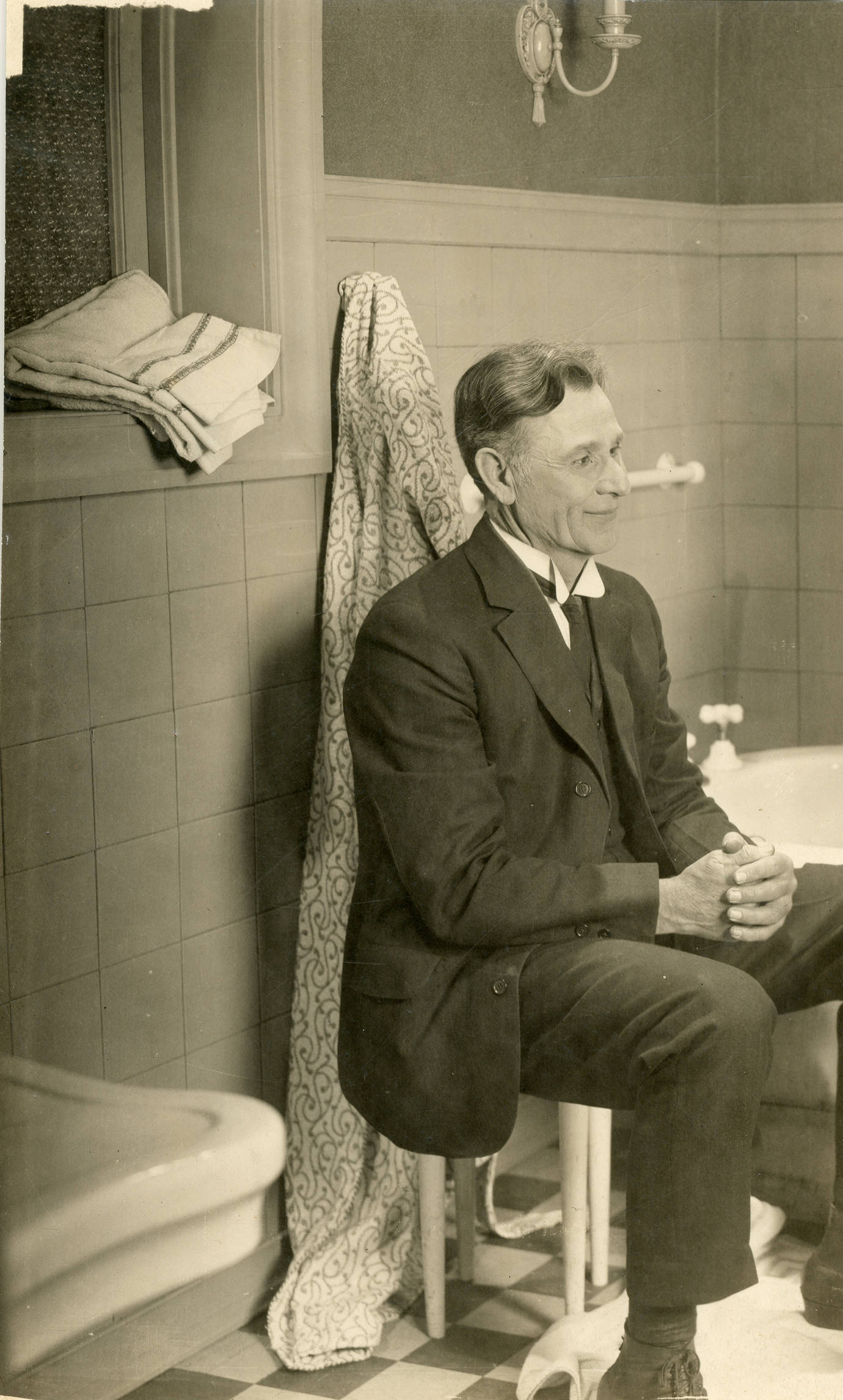
Charles Ogle sekitar tahun 1926

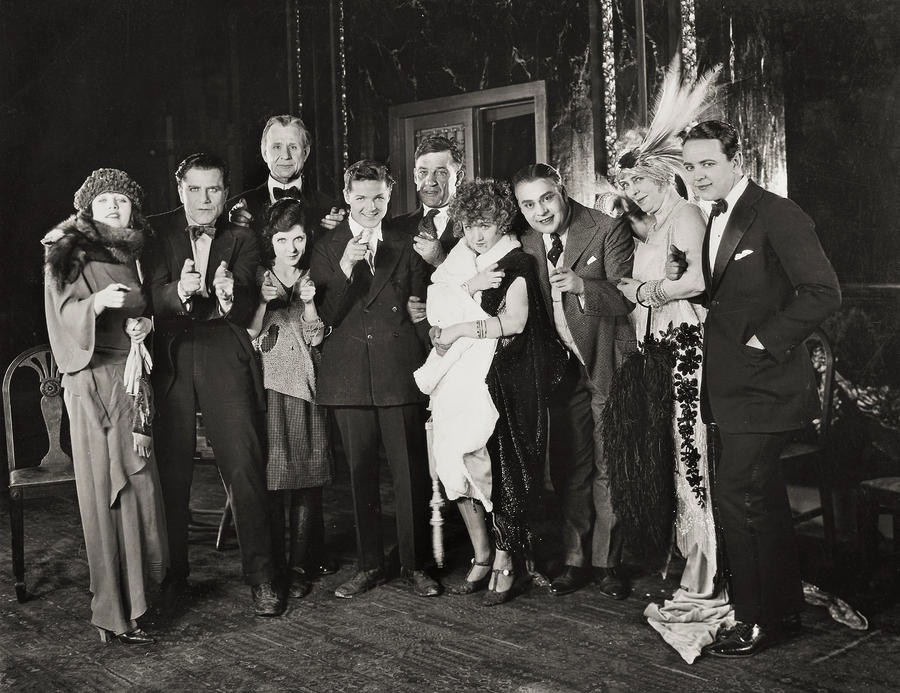
Ogle (back row, behind May McAvoy) with other cast of Kick In (1922)

Charles Stanton Ogle (June 5, 1865 – October 11, 1940) was an American stage and silent-film actor and lawyer. He was the first actor to portray Frankenstein's monster in a motion picture in 1910 and played Long John Silver in Treasure Island in 1920.

== Biography ==
Ogle, born in Steubenville, Ohio, was the son of an Irish Methodist minister. Ogle attended law school at the University of Illinois College of Law, and he practiced law for about two years.

Starting his career on Broadway in 1905, actor Ogle transitioned to film in 1908 at Edison Studios, appearing in notable films like The Boston Tea Party and Frankenstein (1910). He starred in US first film serial What Happened to Mary (1912) and later joined Paramount Studios in 1920. There, he played iconic roles such as Long John Silver in Treasure Island, alongside Lon Chaney. Ogle went on to become a prolific character actor, appearing in over 300 films before retiring in 1926.

After retiring from film he resumed working as a lawyer until his death. Ogle died in Long Beach, California of arteriosclerosis.

== Selected filmography ==
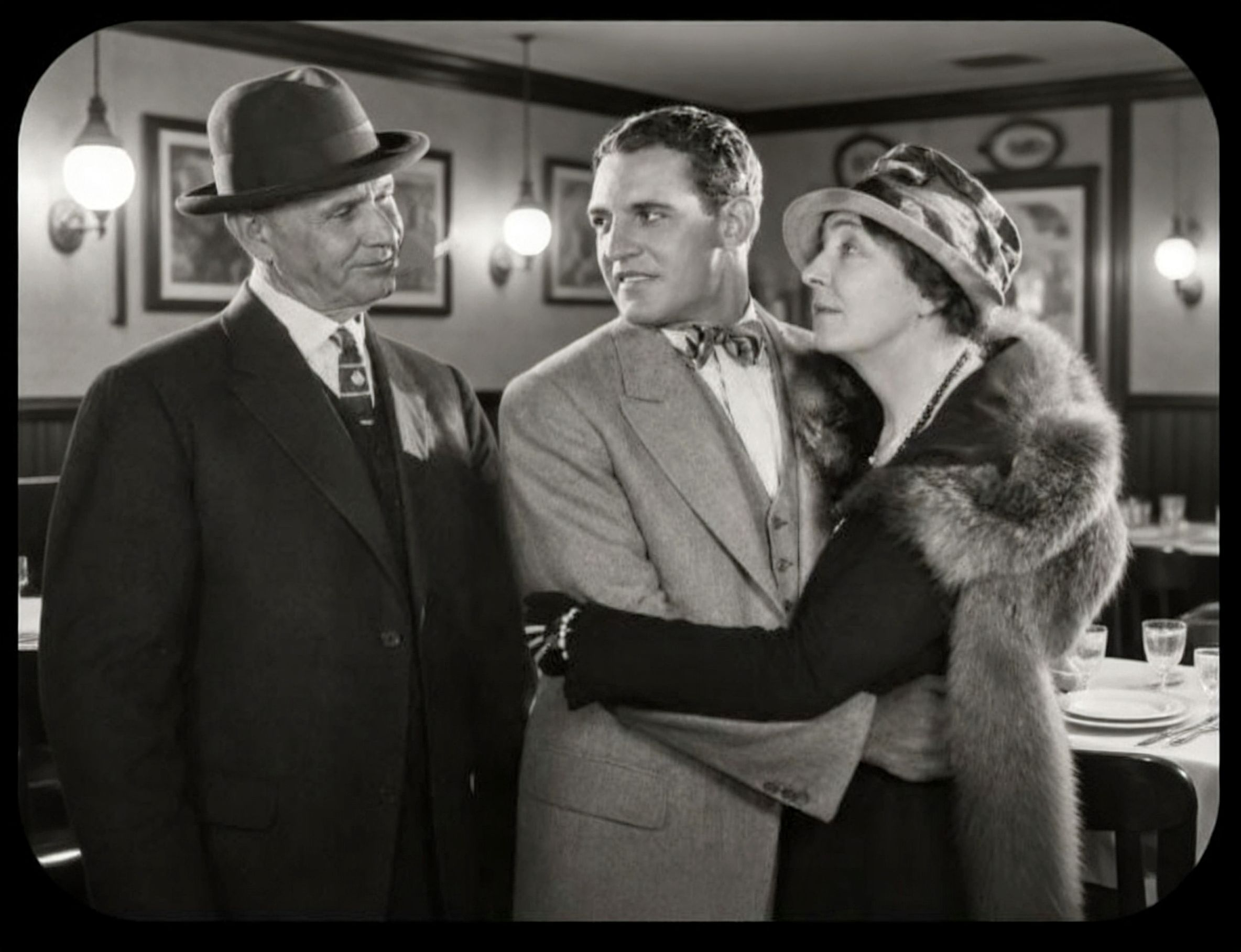
Ogle in One Minute To Play (1926)

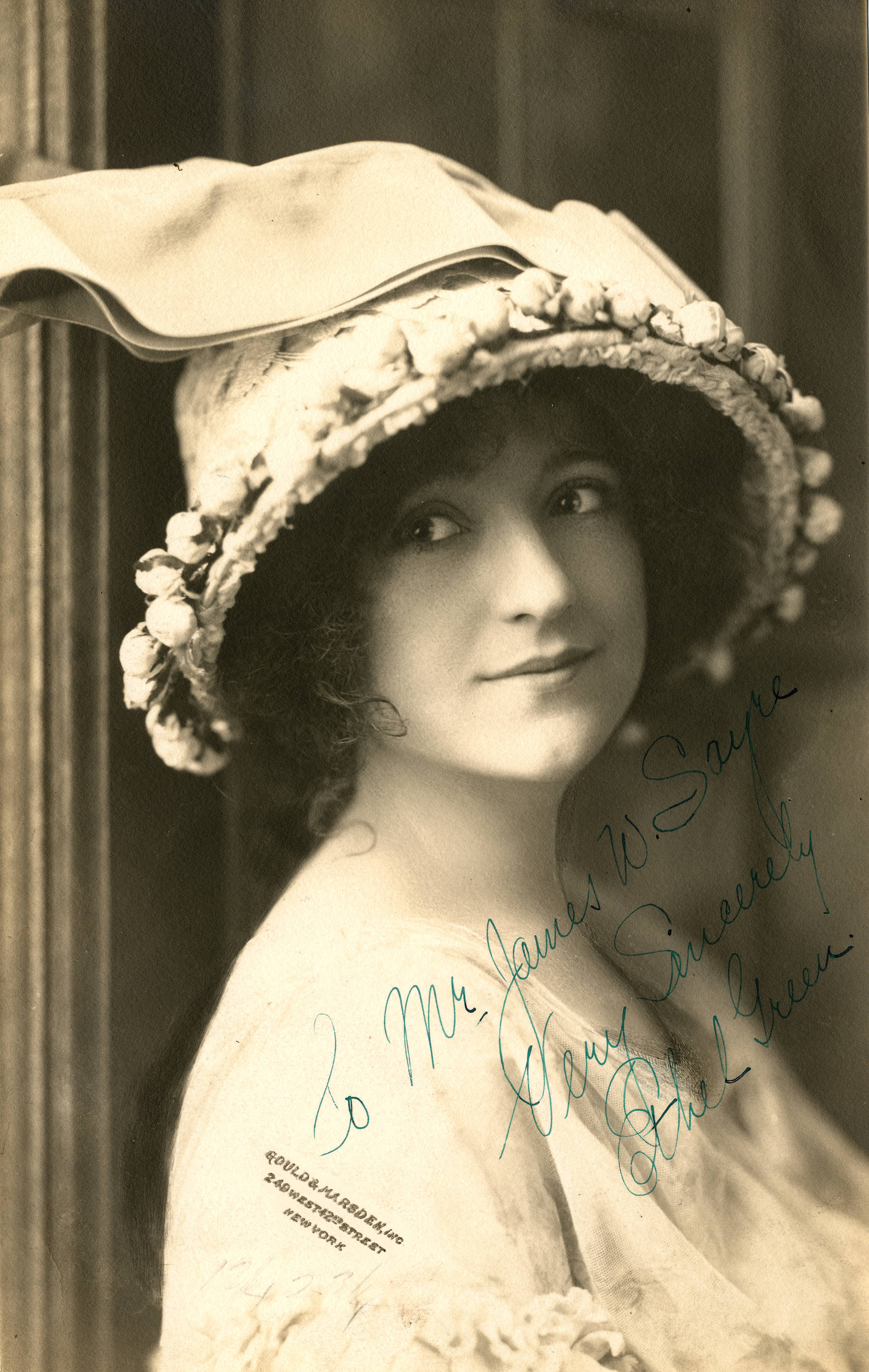
Ethel Pauline Green, Ogle's wife, 1912

- The Boston Tea Party (1908, Short)
- Frankenstein (1910, Short) – The Monster (uncredited)
- A Christmas Carol (1910, Short) – Bob Cratchit
- Turned to the Wall (1911, Short) – Squire Ruby
- The Battle of Trafalgar (1911) – The Ship's Surgeon
- Captain Nell (1911) short – Mr. Randolph, Harry's Father
- The Black Arrow (1911) short – Richard Shelton
- For the Cause of the South (1912) – Confederate Colonel Randall
- A Personal Affair (1912, Short) – The Prizefighter
- Like Knights of Old (1912, Short) – The Knight
- What Happened to Mary (1912, Short) – Richard Craig – Mary's Uncle
- The Diamond Crown (1913, Short) – Kate's Father – An Ex-Detective
- The Active Life of Dolly of the Dailies (1914) – James Malone
- The Man Who Disappeared (1914) – Miens / Biceps
- The Woman Who Lied (1915, short) - Sheriff Cassidy
- Thou Shalt Not Lie (1915, Short) – The Detective
- Under Southern Skies (1915) – Major Crofton
- The Heir to the Hoorah (1916) – Bill Ferguson
- The Years of the Locust (1916) – McKenzie, Mead's Mine Manager
- On Record (1917) – Frederick Manson
- Those Without Sin (1917) – Colonel Dackens
- The Cost of Hatred (1917) – McCabe
- A Romance of the Redwoods (1917) – Jim Lyn
- At First Sight (1917)
- Rebecca of Sunnybrook Farm (1917) – Mr. Cobb
- The Sunset Trail (1917) – Judd Aiken
- The Secret Game (1917) – Dr. Ebell Smith
- Nan of Music Mountain (1917) – Sassoon
- The Fair Barbarian (1917)
- Jules of the Strong Heart (1918) – Tom Farnsworth
- Rimrock Jones (1918) – Hassayamp Hicks
- The Thing We Love (1918) – Adolph Weimer
- Wild Youth (1918) – Doctor
- The Whispering Chorus (1918) – Judge (uncredited)
- M'Liss (1918) – Yuba Bill
- Old Wives for New (1918) – Bit Role (uncredited)
- Believe Me, Xantippe (1918) – Wrenn Wrgley
- We Can't Have Everything (1918) – Kedzie's Father
- The Firefly of France (1918) – Von Blenheim (aka Jenkins)
- Less Than Kin (1918) – Overton
- The Source (1918) – 'Sim-Sam' Samuels
- The Goat (1918) – Director Graham
- Too Many Millions (1918) – Garage Keeper
- The Squaw Man (1918) – Bull Cowan
- Under the Top (1919) – Otto B. Shott
- The Dub (1919) – George Markham
- Alias Mike Moran (1919) – Peter Young
- The Poor Boob (1919) – Tucker
- Something to Do (1919) – Professor Frank Blight
- Fires of Faith (1919) – William Booth, Found of the Salvation Army
- Men, Women, and Money (1919) – Dr. Malcolm Lloyd
- A Daughter of the Wolf (1919) – Doc
- The Heart of Youth (1919) – Os Whipple
- The Valley of the Giants (1919) – Cardigan
- Told in the Hills (1919) – Davy MacDougall
- The Lottery Man (1919)
- Hawthorne of the U.S.A. (1919) – Col. Radulski
- Everywoman (1919) – Time
- Young Mrs. Winthrop (1920) – Buxton Scott
- Jack Straw (1920) – Mr. Parker Jennings
- Treasure Island (1920) – Long John Silver
- What's Your Hurry? (1920) – Patrick MacMurran
- The Prince Chap (1920) – Runion
- Conrad in Quest of His Youth (1920) – Dobson
- Midsummer Madness (1921) – Caretaker
- The Jucklins (1921) – Lim Judklin
- Brewster's Millions (1921) – Colonel Drew
- What Every Woman Knows (1921) – Alick Wylie
- A Wise Fool (1921) – Judge Carcasson
- Gasoline Gus (1921) – Nate Newberry
- Crazy to Marry (1921) – Cement man
- The Affairs of Anatol (1921) – Dr. Bowles (uncredited)
- After the Show (1921) – Pop O'Malley
- Miss Lulu Bett (1921) – Station Agent
- A Homespun Vamp (1922) – Donald Craig
- Her Husband's Trademark (1922) – Father Berlekey
- Is Matrimony a Failure? (1922) – Pop Skinner
- North of the Rio Grande (1922) – Colonel Haddington
- The Woman Who Walked Alone (1922) – Schriemann
- Our Leading Citizen (1922) – The Judge
- If You Believe It, It's So (1922) – Colonel Williams
- Manslaughter (1922) – Doctor
- The Young Rajah (1922) – Joshua Judd
- Thirty Days (1922) – Judge Hooker
- Kick In (1922) – John Stephens
- Garrison's Finish (1923) – Colonel Desha's Trainer
- Grumpy (1923) – Ruddock
- The Covered Wagon (1923) – Jesse Wingate
- Sixty Cents an Hour (1923) – James Smith
- Hollywood (1923) – Himself (cameo)
- Salomy Jane (1923) – Madison Clay
- Ruggles of Red Gap (1923) – Jeff Tuttle
- The Ten Commandments (1923) – The Doctor
- Flaming Barriers (1924) – Patrick Malone
- Secrets (1924) – Dr. McGovern
- Triumph (1924) – James Martin
- Code of the Sea (1924) – Superintendent Beasley
- The Bedroom Window (1924) – Butler
- The Border Legion (1924) – Harvey Roberts
- Merton of the Movies (1924) – Mr. Montague
- The Alaskan (1924) – Lawyer
- The Garden of Weeds (1924) – Henry Poulson
- Code of the West (1925) – Henry Thurman
- The Golden Bed (1925) – Minor Role (uncredited)
- Contraband (1925) – Sheriff Churchill
- The Thundering Herd (1925) – Clark Hudnall
- One Minute to Play (1926) – John Wade
- The Flaming Forest (1926) – Donald McTavish (final film role)
