= Two Minutes to Go =

1921 film

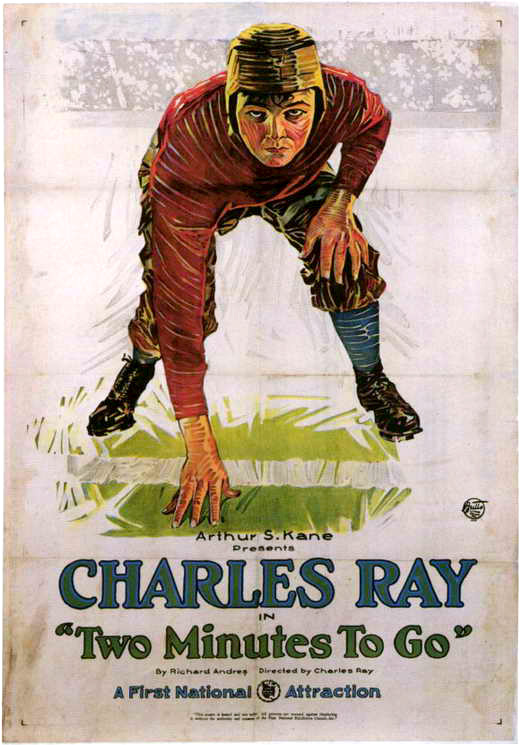
- Theatrical release poster
- Directed by: Charles Ray
- Story by: Richard Andres
- Produced by: Charles Ray
- Starring: Charles Ray; Mary Anderson; Lionel Belmore; Lincoln Stedman; Truman Van Dyke; Gus Leonard
- Cinematography: George Rizard
- Production company: Charles Ray Productions
- Distributed by: Associated First National
- Release date: October 17, 1921
- Running time: 60 minutes; 6 reels
- Country: United States
- Language: Silent (English intertitles)

Two Minutes to Go is a 1921 American silent sport comedy-drama film directed by Charles Ray and written by Richard Andres. The film stars Charles Ray, Mary Anderson, Lionel Belmore, Lincoln Stedman, Truman Van Dyke and Gus Leonard. The film was released by Associated First National on October 17, 1921.

== Cast ==
- Charles Ray as Chester Burnett
- Mary Anderson as Ruth Turner
- Lionel Belmore as Mr. Turner, Ruth's Father
- Lincoln Stedman as "Fatty"
- Truman Van Dyke as "Angel"
- Gus Leonard as Butler
- Tom Wilson as Football Coach
- Bert Woodruff as The Janitor
- François Dumas as The Dean of Baker University
- Phil Dunham as Professor of Spanish (credited as Phillip Dunham)

== Preservation ==
Two Minutes to Go is now considered lost.

== See also ==
- List of American football films
