= One Minute to Play =

1926 film directed by Sam Wood

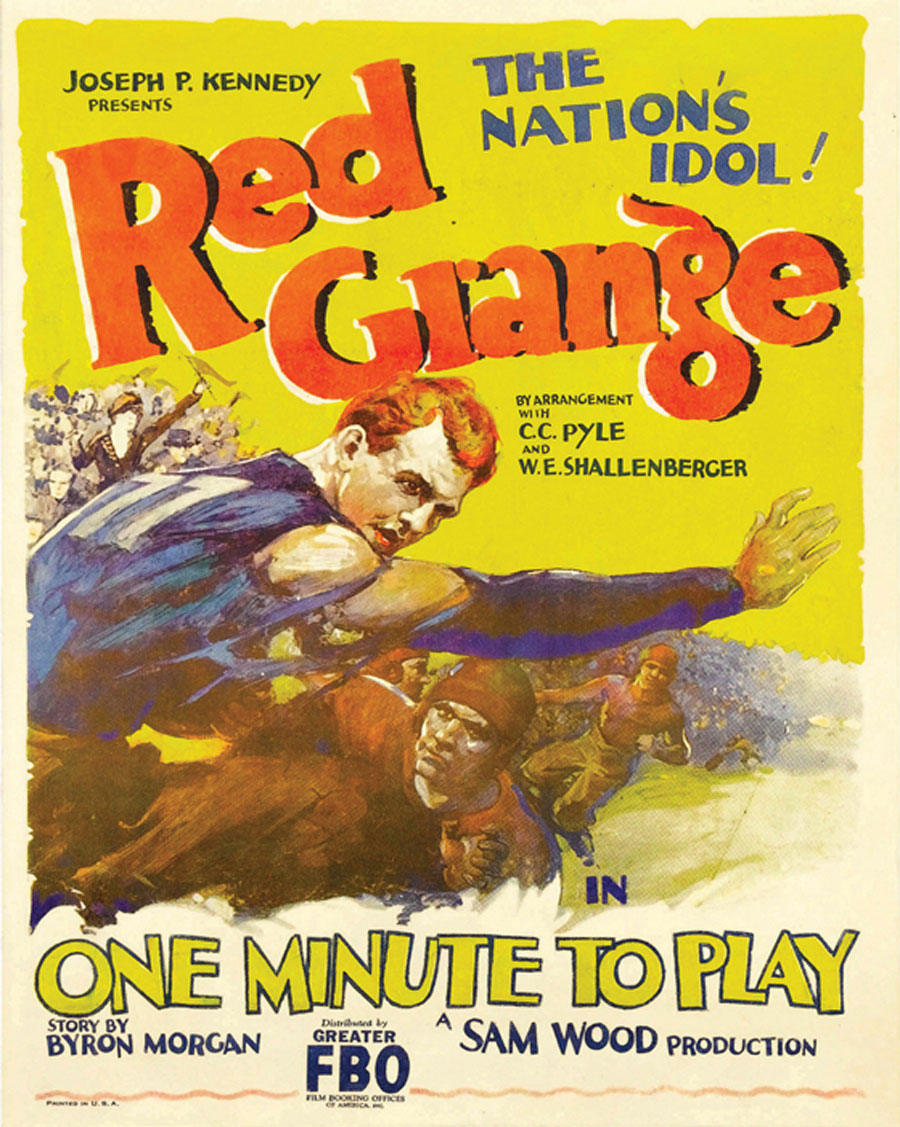
- Theatrical release poster
- Directed by: Sam Wood
- Screenplay by: Byron Morgan
- Starring: Red Grange; Mary McAllister; Charles Stanton Ogle; George Wilson; Ben Hendricks Jr. Lee Shumway
- Cinematography: Charles G. Clarke
- Production company: Film Booking Offices of America
- Distributed by: Film Booking Offices of America
- Release date: September 12, 1926
- Running time: 74 minutes
- Country: United States
- Language: Silent (English intertitles)

One Minute to Play is a 1926 American silent drama film directed by Sam Wood and written by Byron Morgan. The film stars Red Grange, Mary McAllister, Charles Stanton Ogle, George Wilson, Ben Hendricks Jr., and Lee Shumway. The film was released on September 12, 1926, by Film Booking Offices of America (FBO).

== Plot ==
Red Wade is a star high school football player who hopes to attend Claxton University and play for its decorated college football team. However, his disapproving father John wants him to quit the sport and attend Parmalee University, a school that has struggled financially and athletically, to focus on his education. On the train ride to Claxton, he meets Sally Rogers, whose brother Tex is the head football coach at Parmalee, and gets into a fight with Claxton captain Biff Wheeler that knocks him out.

Upon recovering, Red is inadvertently taken to Parmalee, where he reunites with Sally and elects to stay. Although he had promised to obey his father and refuses to try out for the team, the desire to do so anyway proves to be too strong and he ultimately makes the roster. With Red in the backfield, the hapless Parmalee team wins its first game in years.

Meanwhile, John gives a $100,000 endowment to Parmalee, which his good friend and university president Todd accepts. However, he discovers Red has been playing football behind his back after learning of his on-field success in a newspaper sent by his roommate Tubby. The day before the Parmalee game against Claxton, he confronts Red and threatens to withdraw his endowment if he plays. Todd urges Red to play, but the latter decides to feign drunkenness later that night, prompting Coach Rogers to bench him for the game.

John, who has never watched a football game, attends the game to ensure Red is not playing. By halftime, he realizes his enjoyment for the sport and changes his mind on his orders. With Parmalee trailing 6–0 in the fourth quarter, Coach Rogers is hesitant to send Red back in, but caves out of desperation for victory. With one minute remaining, Red scores a touchdown and kicks the game-winning conversion to secure the 7–6 Parmalee win.

== Cast ==
- Red Grange as Red Wade
- Mary McAllister as Sally Rogers
- Charles Stanton Ogle as John Wade
- George Wilson as Player 33
- Ben Hendricks Jr. as Biff Wheeler
- Lee Shumway as Tex Rogers
- Al Cooke as Brakeman
- Kit Guard as Trainman
- King Tut the Dog as Team Mascot
- Lincoln Stedman as Toodles
- Jay Hunt as College President Todd
- Edythe Chapman as Mrs. Wade

== Production ==
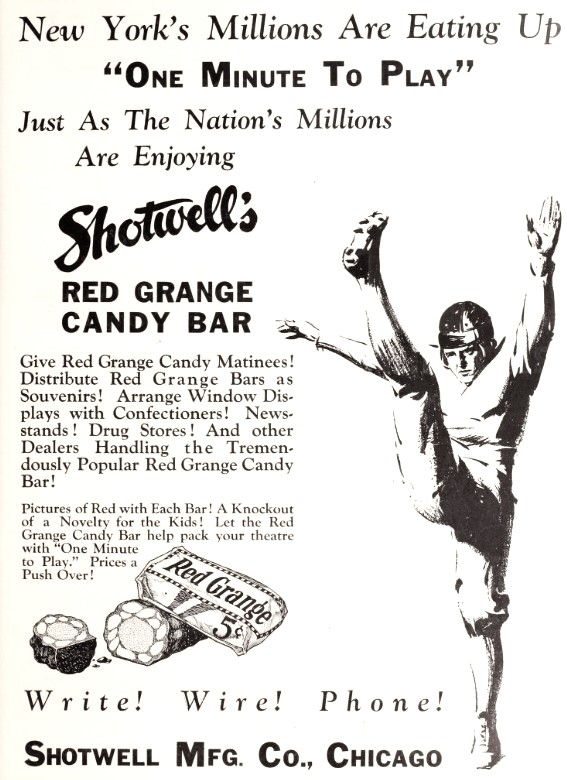
Advertisement for a Red Grange Candy Bar to promote the film

In 1925, as one of college football's biggest names, Red Grange considered entering the acting business in addition to playing professional football. Later in the year, he joined the National Football League's Chicago Bears for a barnstorming tour; between games in December, agent C. C. Pyle showed off a movie check worth $300,000 as a publicity stunt. The next day, The New York Times reported the Arrow Production Company had picked up the check, though Grange revealed in his 1953 autobiography that he really only received $5,000 per week for the film. On December 11, while Grange was nursing a severe arm injury he had suffered in a game earlier in the day, the Motion Picture Owners' Association of America announced Grange's film might be barred from airing in association-operated theaters if the check bounced.

Production began in June 1926, an experience Grange described as "the worst drudgery I'd ever experienced." George Wilson, a former Washington Huskies football star who had played against Grange on various occasions during the barnstorming tour, portrayed a Claxton player in the Claxton/Parmalee game. The game, as were all football scenes, were filmed at Pomona College; due to the California summer heat and the movie taking place in the Midwest during autumn, extras as appropriately-dressed fans were not readily available. Pyle proposed promoting the climax as a genuine exhibition game with fans dressed in fall attire being granted free admission; as a result, 15,000 spectators attended the filming.

== Reception ==
One Minute to Play premiered at the Rialto Square Theatre on October 4, 1926. One movie critic for the Chicago Tribune wrote, "If you've never seen Red Grange play football, now's your chance, for he plays it like every thing in this picture." Another writer called the film "unquestionably the most authentic and thrilling college film ever made", while The Minneapolis Star's Agnes Taafee praised Grange's performance and the football sequences, but criticized certain scenes like the train fight for their lack of realism.

In his autobiography, Grange wrote he "received several congratulatory wires from the top studio brass telling me how pleased they were with my work and that in their opinion the film was one of the best they had ever produced." After the film was released, FBO head Joseph P. Kennedy Sr. attempted to convince Grange to retire from football and became a full-time actor for the studio, but he declined.
