= Treasure Island (1920 film) =

1920 film by Maurice Tourneur

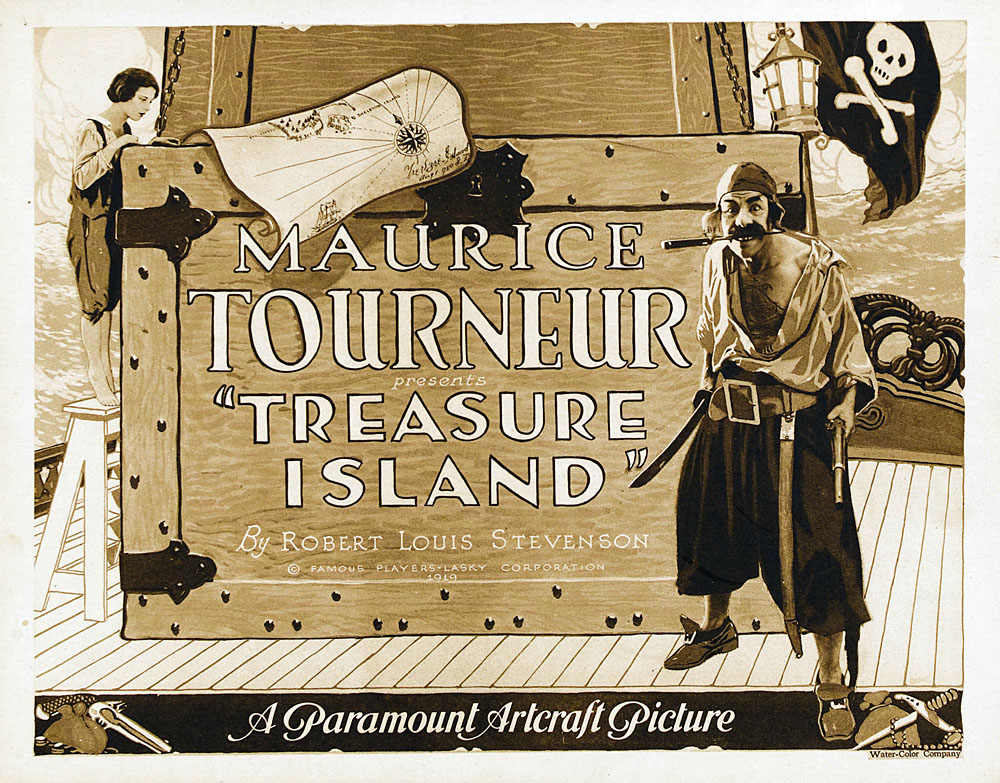
- Directed by: Maurice Tourneur
- Screenplay by: Jules Furthman (credited as Stephen Fox)
- Based on: Treasure Island; 1883 novel by Robert Louis Stevenson
- Produced by: Maurice Tourneur
- Starring: Lon Chaney; Shirley Mason; Charles Ogle; Sydney Deane; Charles Hill Mailes
- Cinematography: René Guissart
- Production company: Maurice Tourneur Productions
- Distributed by: Paramount-Artcraft Pictures
- Release date: April 4, 1920
- Running time: 6 reels (one hour)
- Country: United States
- Languages: Silent; English intertitles

Treasure Island is a 1920 silent film adaptation of the 1883 novel by Robert Louis Stevenson, directed by Maurice Tourneur, and released by Paramount Pictures. It starred Shirley Mason as Jim Hawkins (a trouser role), Charles Ogle as Long John Silver and Lon Chaney in a dual role as Blind Pew and Merry. The film was chosen as one of the Top Forty Pictures of the Year by the National Board of Review.

The film is now considered a lost film. Reproductions of the film's posters still exist.

== Plot ==
Young Jim Hawkins is caught up with the pirate Long John Silver in search of the buried treasure of the buccaneer Captain Flint. Young Jim Hawkins helps his widowed mother run the Admiral Benbow Inn on the west coast of England.

When former pirate Billy Bones is killed at the inn by other pirates seeking the map to the lost treasure of Captain Flint, Jim finds the map and turns it over to his mother's friends, Dr. Livesey and Squire Trelawney, who organize an expedition to recover the treasure. Jim stows away aboard Livesey and Trelawney's ship, which is crewed by sailors largely chosen by Long John Silver, a one-legged pirate posing as a cook.

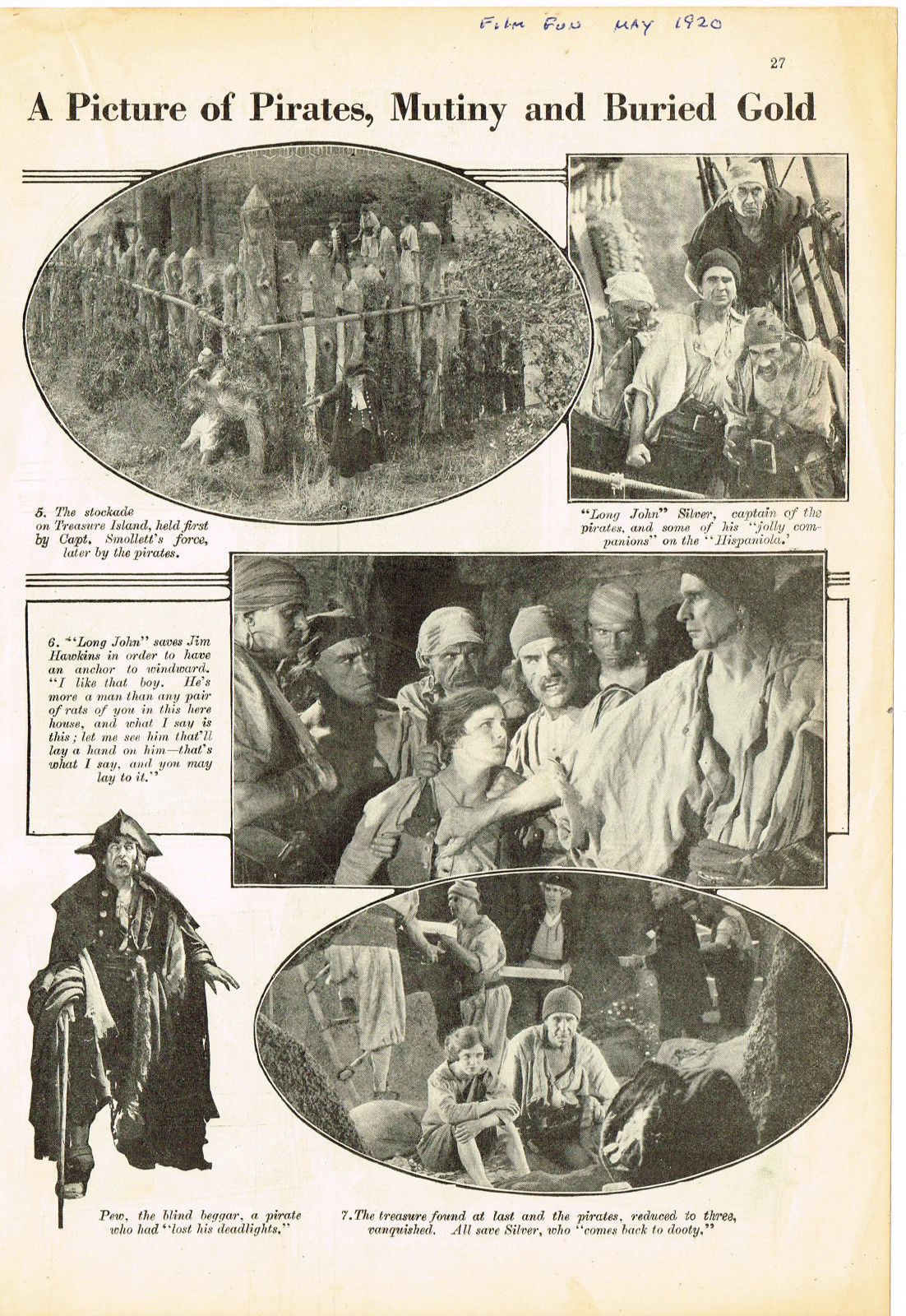
Treasure Island 1920 film magazine article

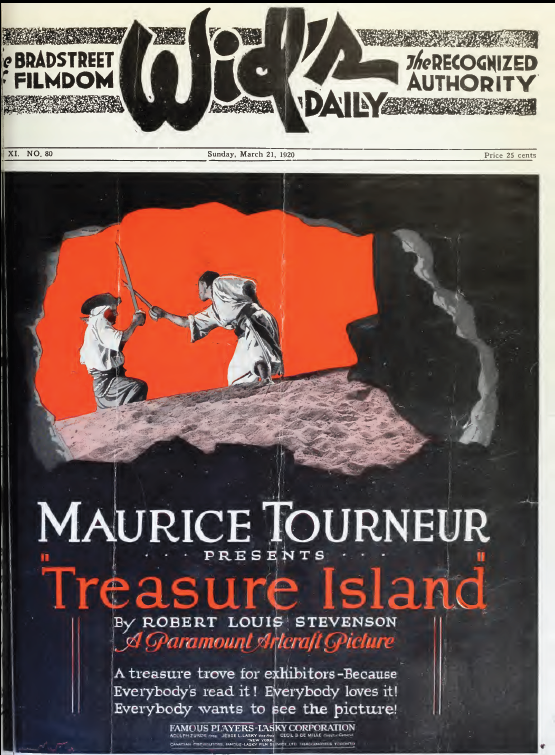
period advertisement

Silver's plans for a mutiny are discovered by Jim and reported to Livesey and Trelawney, who manage to hold the pirates at bay until they arrive at the island and take refuge in a shelter with Jim and the loyal crew members. A battle with the pirates results in the map being turned over to Silver and his gang, but the pirates are eventually routed, and Jim and the others find Flint's treasure through the services of Ben Gunn, a pirate who had been stranded on the island.

== Cast ==
- Shirley Mason as Jim Hawkins
- Lon Chaney - in a dual role as "Blind Pew" and "Merry"
- Charles Ogle as Long John Silver
- Josie Melville as Mrs. Hawkins
- Al W. Filson as Bill Bones
- Wilton Taylor as Black Dog
- Joseph Singleton as Israel Hands
- Bull Montana as Morgan
- Harry Holden as Captain Smollett
- Sydney Deane as Squire Trelawney
- Charles Hill Mailes as Dr. Livesey

== Production ==
In September 1919, announcements of the upcoming film in movie journals stated that Jack Holt would play Long John Silver and that Wallace Beery would play Israel Hands, though both roles were eventually filled by different actors. Both Holt and Beery as well as Lon Chaney and Bull Montana had appeared in Tourneur's Victory the year before. Beery later played Long John Silver in the 1934 remake.

The film reportedly had color sequences, possibly hand-colored with the Handschiegel Color Process. The film opened in New York on April 11, 1920, and some contemporary sources give that date for the film's release.

This film was actually the fifth and most lavish silent film adaptation of the story with productions made in 1908, 1911, 1913, and by Fox Film Corporation in 1918. This version was also the last silent production of the story, and the only version in which Jim Hawkins was played by a woman. Although the reviews were not especially good, the film was the most successful film Tourneur ever made, and was chosen one of the best films of 1920. Chaney fans consider it one of the most desirable of all his "lost films" to discover.

The pirate ship used in the film was an abandoned barkentine called The Fremont, which had actually been used in the African slave trade and was seized by the United States government for participating in illegal activities.

== Reception ==
"Treasure Island is a fine picture and one which will probably stand with the unusual money-makers of the season...Innumerable fine pirate types, headed by those two sterling character actors, Lon Chaney and Charles Ogle, add the finishing touch of Stevenson's atmosphere." ---Wid's Film Daily

"In this production, Maurice Tourneur has given the screen actual touches of something a part of boyhood days... Under the able leadership of Tourneur, this production is worthy of everything said in its favor." ---Exhibitors Trade Review

"Maurice Tourneur's production of TREASURE ISLAND...falls so far short of its original that any comparison of the two must emphasize its defects...The most vivid acting is done by the dependable Lon Chaney in two roles, first, as the blind Pew, and then as the surly Merry." ---The New York Times

"This isn't anywhere near the feature it should be. Maurice Tourneur is a Frenchman and seems incapable of making the most of an Anglo-Saxon subject." ---Variety

"In order to visualize the outstanding details, the scenarist has taken liberties with Stevenson and he may be excused upon the ground that even the screen has its limitations...Charles Ogle is immense as the peg-legged John Silver and Lon Chaney gives another of his vivid character studies as one of the pirate cutthroats or two." ---Motion Picture News

Advertising Tagline: "Wicked pirates and buried gold, Deeds that make the blood run cold; Tallest tale that e'er was told! Yo-ho-ho, and a bottle of rum" ---(Print Ad- The Painesville Telegraph, ((Painesville, Ohio)) 10 July 1920)

== See also ==
- List of lost films
- List of early color feature films
- 20th Television Fox

== Gallery ==
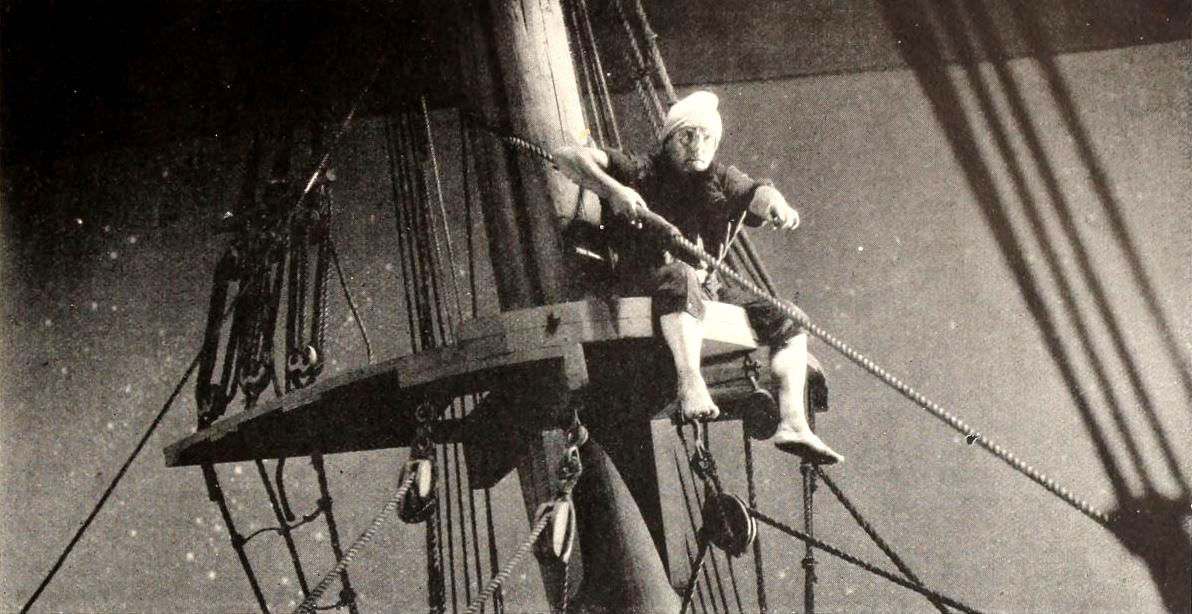
A pirate on lookout

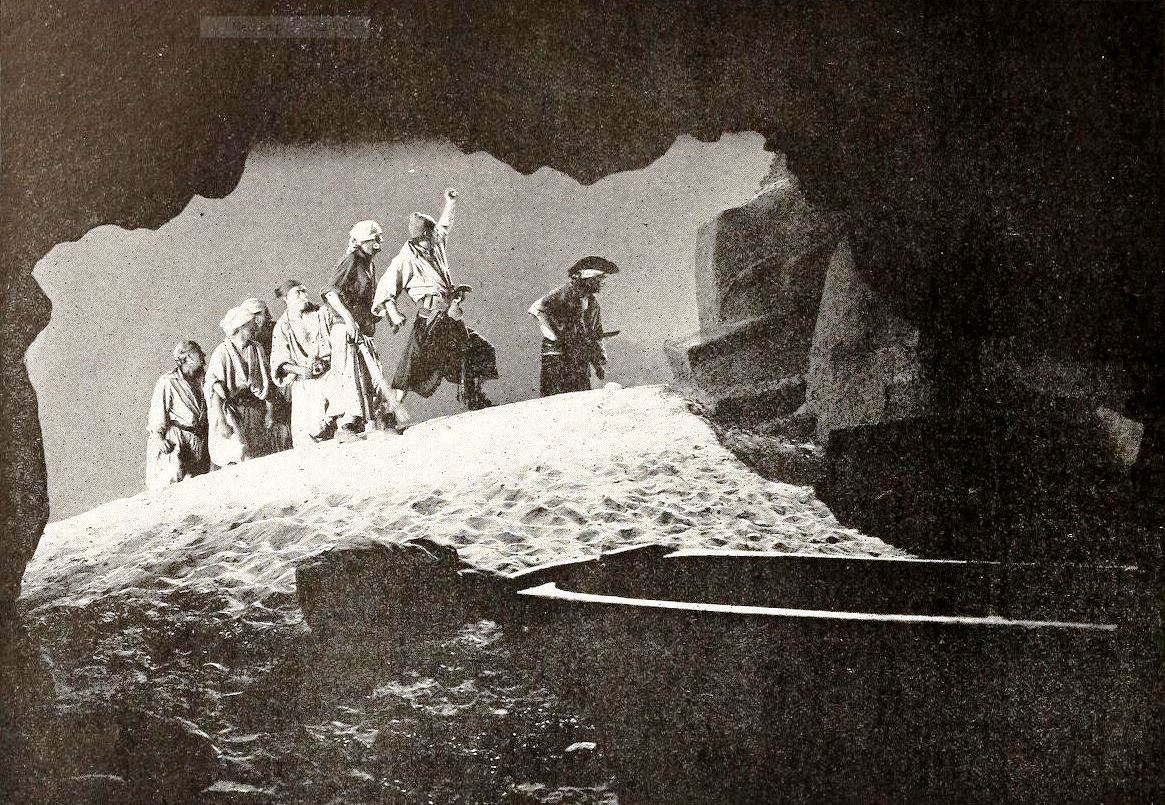
Pirates by the mouth of a cave on the island

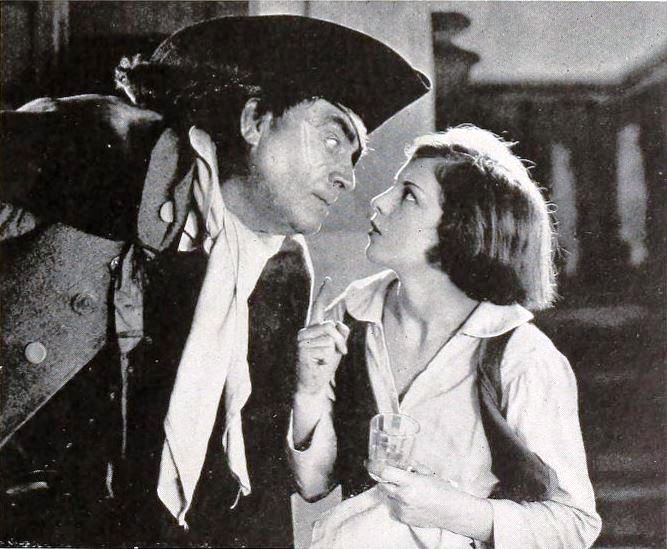
Ogle and Mason

Lon Chaney as Blind Pew

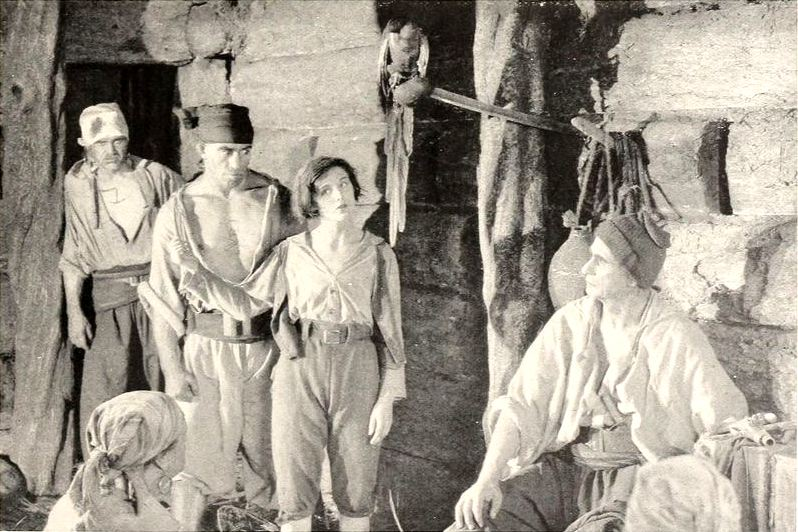
Jim a prisoner of the pirate crew

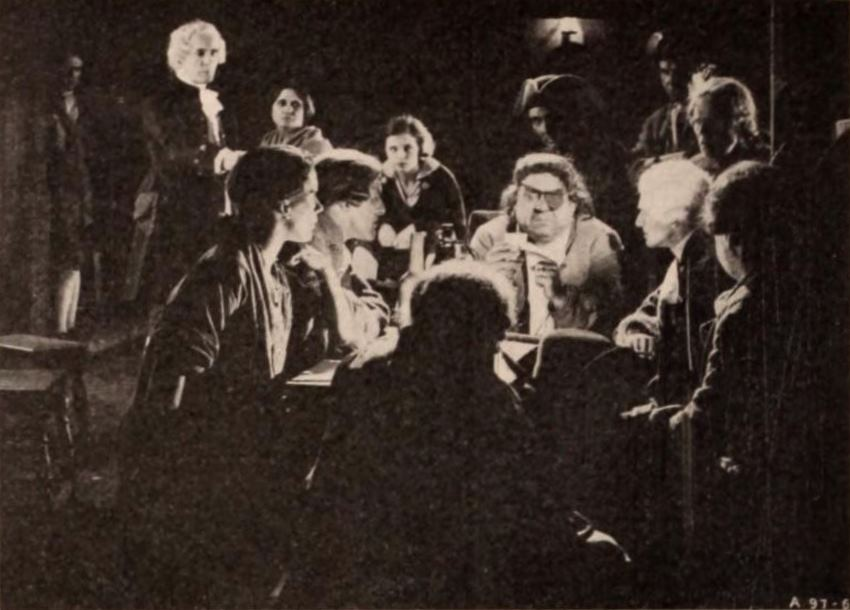
Pirate gathering
