= Threads of Fate (film) =

1917 silent film

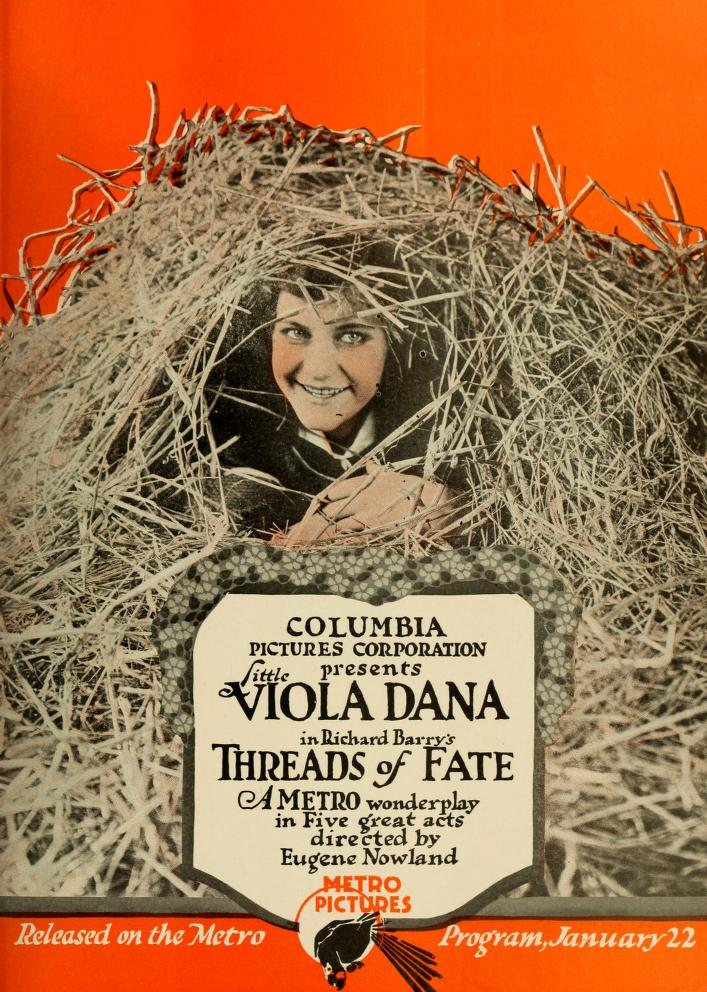
- Directed by: Eugene Nowland
- Written by: Richard Barry; June Mathis
- Starring: Viola Dana; Augustus Phillips; Richard Tucker
- Cinematography: John Arnold
- Production company: Columbia Pictures
- Distributed by: Metro Pictures
- Release date: January 22, 1917
- Running time: 50 minutes
- Country: United States
- Languages: Silent; English intertitles

Threads of Fate is a 1917 American silent drama film directed by Eugene Nowland and starring Viola Dana, Augustus Phillips and Richard Tucker.

== Cast ==
- Viola Dana as Dorothea
- Augustus Phillips as Tom Wentworth
- Richard Tucker as Dr. Grant Hunter
- Fred C. Jones as Marquis Giovanni del Carnacacchi
- Helen Strickland as Sarah Wentworth
- Nellie Grant as Marcella
- Robert Whittier as Jim Gregory

== Bibliography ==
- Leonhard Gmür. Rex Ingram: Hollywood's Rebel of the Silver Screen. 2013.
