= The Boston Tea Party (1908 film) =

- Directed by: Edwin S. Porter and J. Searle Dawley
- Written by: James Cogan
- Starring: Herbert Prior; Charles Ogle
- Cinematography: Frederick S. Armitage; J. Searle Dawley
- Production company: Edison Manufacturing Company
- Distributed by: Edison Manufacturing Company
- Release date: 15 July 1908
- Running time: Approximately 6 minutes (550 feet)
- Country: United States
- Language: Silent

The Boston Tea Party is a 1908 silent film directed by Edwin S. Porter, and produced and distributed by Edison Studios. The film is a fictionalized depiction of the events of the 1773 Boston Tea Party. It was the film debut of actor Charles Stanton Ogle.

== Plot ==
Described by Edison Films as an "unrivalled historical production of colonial times", the synopsis of scenes was:

BEFORE THE STORM. — Epoch-making days — Liberty stirs the blood of the Colonists — Grave issues discussed — "Sons of Liberty" take action.

THE MAN AND THE HOUR. — "Market Day" — Eager for news — Arrival of hero at tavern — Posted call for mass meeting — Informer (rival of heroine) off to sell information — Heroine welcomes hero.

BRITISH HEADQUARTERS. — Informer reports — Leads soldiers — Off to capture hero — Posting £1,000 reward — Searching house.

HEROINE OUTWITS THE ENEMY. — Secreting hero — Informer baffled — Fruitless chase — Heroine throws off disguise — Escape of hero.

THE RENDEZVOUS. — Tea Tax arouses populace — "Sons of Liberty" disguise as Indians — Off to the harbor.

ATTACK ON THE SHIP. — A dark, silent night — Unexpected attack — Crew overpowered — Piling the tea on deck.

HEROINE'S WARNING. — A fast ride — Tea party warned in time — Soldiers get warm reception — Soldiers and crew Imprisoned.

THE RATTLESNAKE FLAG. — Throwing the tea overboard — Home thrust at tyranny — Rattlesnake Flag unfurled — Informer attacks hero — He follows the tea overboard.

TABLEAU. — Great Historic Picture of "The Tea Party in Boston Harbor."

== Production ==
The film was one of the first two films at Edison Studios made using a two production-unit system, by J. Searle Dawley and Frederick S. Armitage under the supervision of Edwin S. Porter.

== Reception ==
The film received very mixed reviews. It was criticized for a lack of coherent narrative, and described as "marred by the obscurity of the opening scenes." Newspapers reportedly described it as "an exciting historical film" and "an exceptionally interesting reproduction of that historic event."
