= Jack Straw (film) =

1920 film by William C. deMille

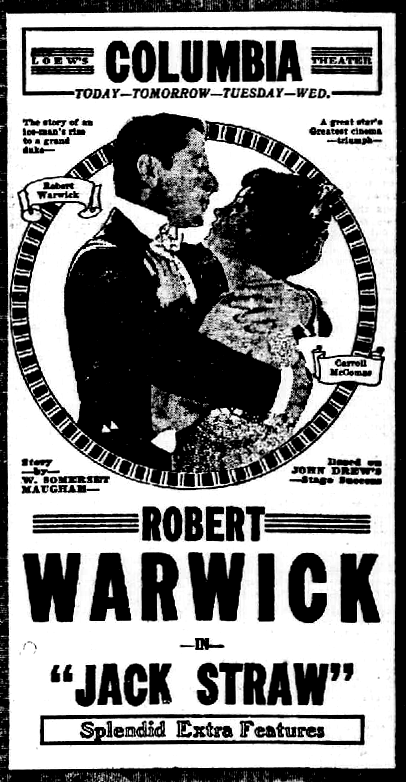
- Newspaper ad
- Directed by: William C. deMille
- Written by: Olga Printzlau (scenario); Elmer Harris (scenario)
- Based on: Jack Straw by W. Somerset Maugham
- Produced by: Adolph Zukor; Jesse L. Lasky
- Starring: Robert Warwick; Carroll McComas
- Cinematography: L. Guy Wilky
- Production company: Famous Players–Lasky
- Distributed by: Paramount Pictures
- Release date: March 14, 1920
- Running time: 5 reels; 4,707 feet
- Country: United States
- Language: Silent (English intertitles)

Jack Straw is a 1920 American silent comedy film produced by Famous Players–Lasky and distributed by Paramount Pictures. William C. deMille directed the film and Robert Warwick and Carroll McComas star. The film is based on a 1908 stage play by W. Somerset Maugham starring John Drew and a young Mary Boland. In 1926 Paramount attempted a remake of this film called The Waiter from the Ritz which was begun and/or completed but never released. James Cruze directed and Raymond Griffith starred; this film, if completed, is now lost. The 1920 film survives at the Library of Congress.

== Plot ==
Based upon a review of the plot in a film publication, Jack Straw is an iceman who becomes a waiter to be closer to the girl he is interested in. Later, to impress her, he impersonates an Archduke from Pomerania. A Count from Pomerania who is the ambassador arrives and learns of the long-missing son of royalty. The girl's mother learns of the trick being played by Jack. Just when Jack is exposed as being a fraud, it turns out that he is the genuine article. The girl's mother then gladly announces her daughter's engagement to Jack.

== Cast ==
- Robert Warwick as Jack Straw
- Carroll McComas as Ethel Parker Jennings
- Charles Ogle as Mr. Parker Jennings
- Irene Sullivan as Mrs. Wanley
- Monte du Mont as Ambrose Holland
- Frances Parks as Rose
- Lucien Littlefield as Sherlo
- Robert Brower as Count of Pomerania
- Sylvia Ashton as Mrs. Parker Jennings

unbilled

- Mayme Kelso (unknown role)
