= Lincoln Stedman =

American actor

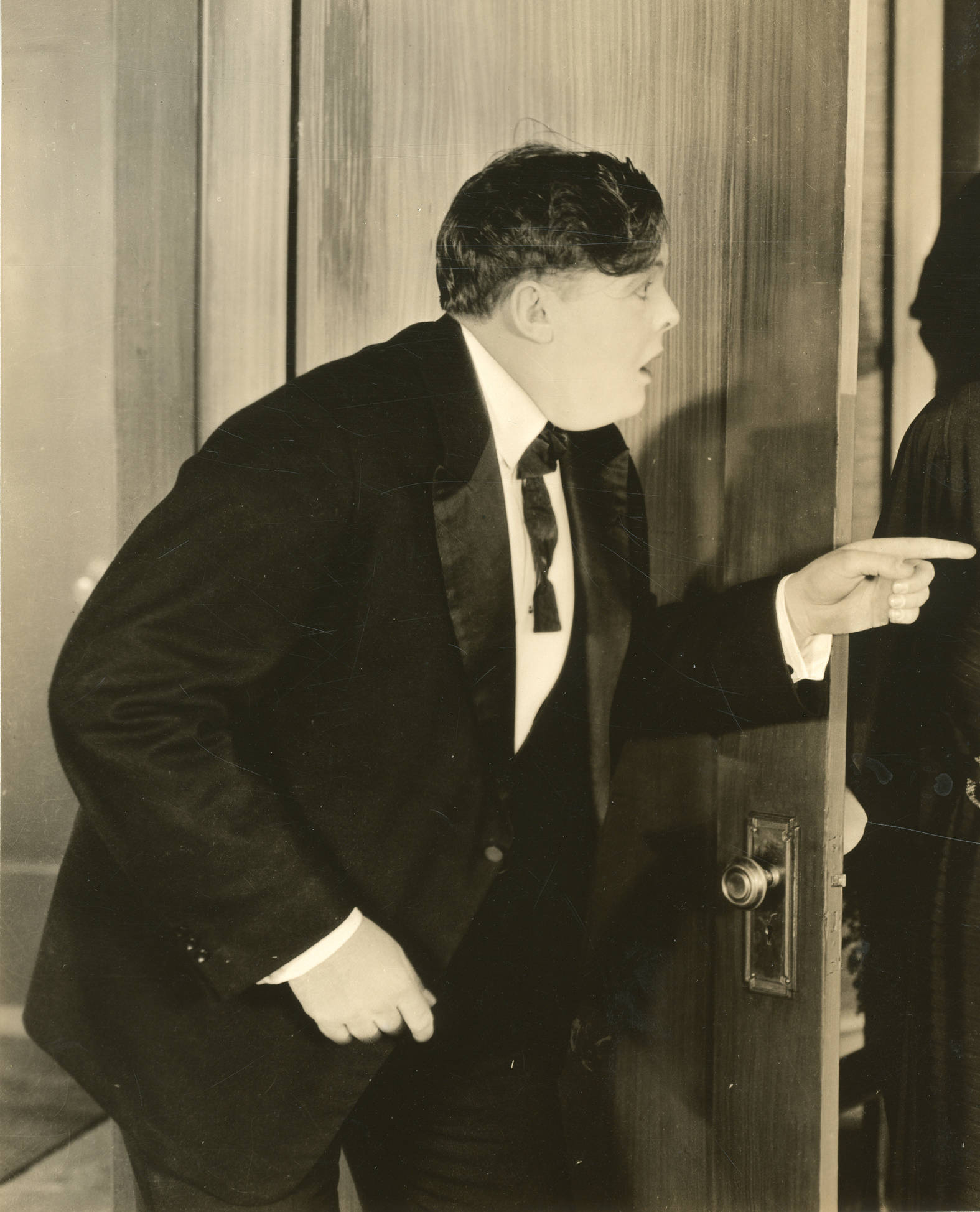
- Stedman c. 1922
- Born: Lincoln Stedman; May 18, 1907; Denver, Colorado, United States
- Died: March 22, 1948 (aged 40); Los Angeles, California, United States
- Occupation: Actor
- Years active: 1917–1934

Lincoln Stedman (May 18, 1907 – March 22, 1948) was an American silent film actor.

== Biography ==
Stedman was born in Denver, Colorado, the only child to Marshall Stedman and silent film beauty Myrtle Stedman. Stedman had a career in films dating back to his boyhood in silent films with his parents. He appeared in more than 80 films between 1917 and 1934. Overweight as a teenager, Stedman resembled Roscoe Arbuckle which allowed him to convincingly play adult roles far beyond his years in real life.

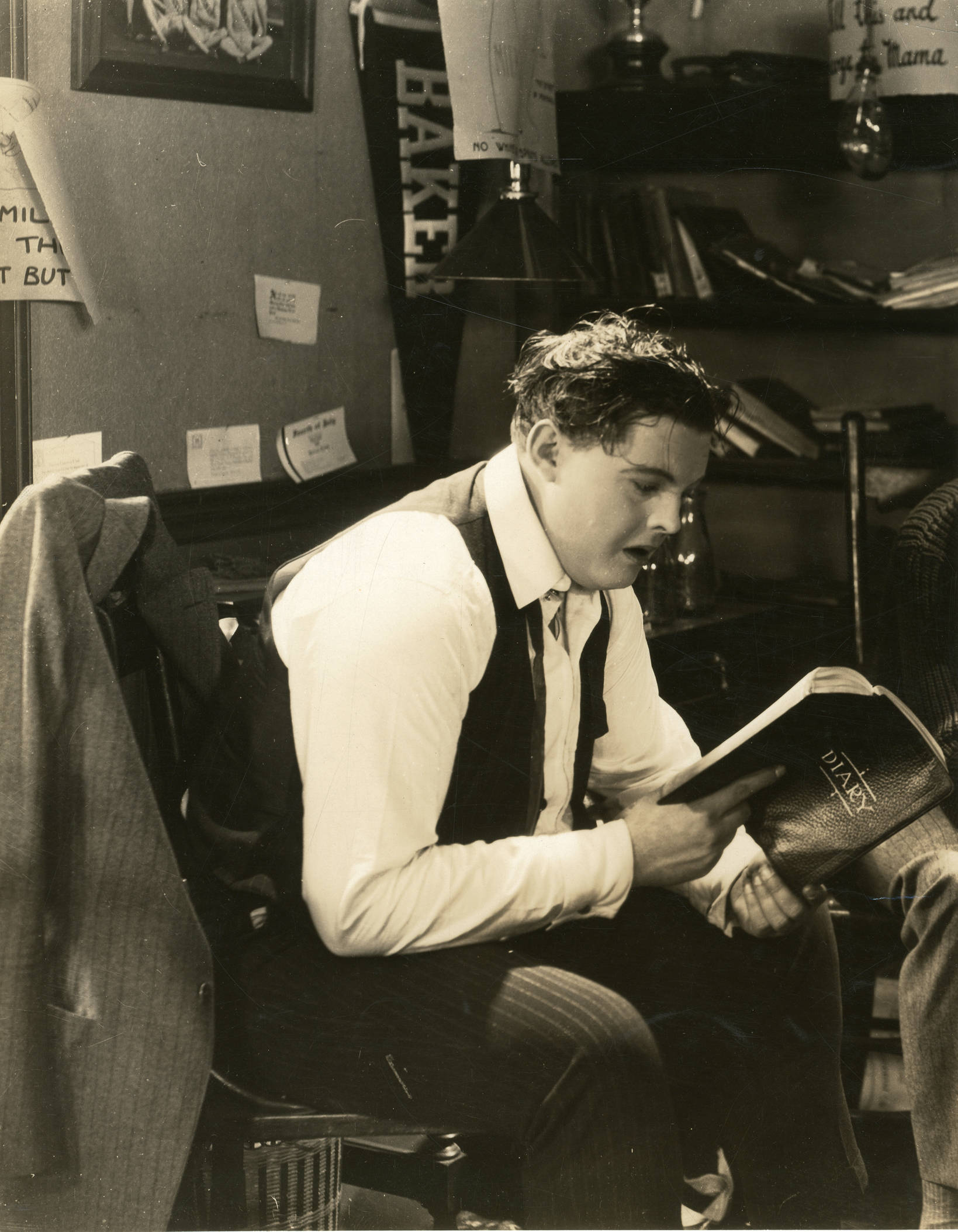
Lincoln Steadman in 1922.

He was married to Carol Rohe Stedman. One month before his death of a heart-ailment, his daughter Loretta Myrtle Stedman was born. Lincoln Stedman died in Los Angeles, California.

== Partial filmography ==
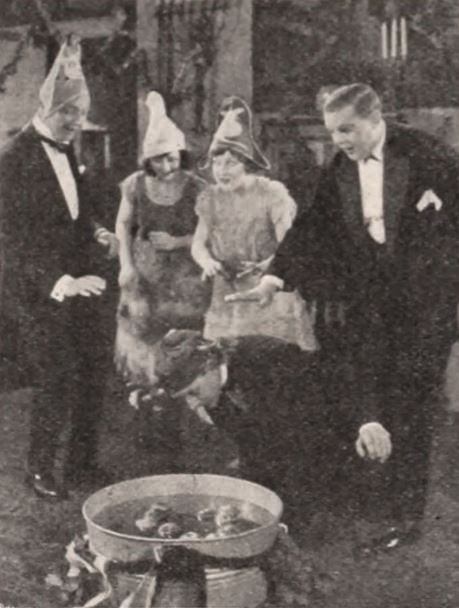
Stedman in american comedy drama film Two Minutes to Go (1921).

- The Charmer (1917)
- The Atom (1918)
- The Winning Girl (1919)
- Puppy Love (1919)
- Out of the Storm (1920)
- The Charm School (1921)
- Two Minutes to Go (1921)
- My Lady Friends (1921)
- The Old Swimmin' Hole (1921)
- Under the Lash (1921)
- Be My Wife (1921)
- A Homespun Vamp (1922)
- One Terrible Day (1922)
- The Freshie (1922)
- White Shoulders (1922)
- The Big Show (1923)
- The Dangerous Age (1923)
- The Prisoner (1923)
- A Pleasant Journey (1923)
- Soul of the Beast (1923)
- The Scarlet Lily (1923)
- Lodge Night (1923)
- No Noise (1923)
- The Wanters (1923)
- The Meanest Man in the World (1923)
- The Man Life Passed By (1923)
- Black Oxen (1923)
- Captain January (1924)
- The Wife of the Centaur (1924)
- On Probation (1924)
- Red Hot Tires (1925)
- Sealed Lips (1925)
- Made for Love (1926)
- One Minute to Play (1926)
- The Warning Signal (1926)
- Remember (1926 film)
- Dame Chance (1926)
- The Little Firebrand (1926)
- Let It Rain (1927)
- Rookies (1927)
- The Prince of Headwaiters (1927)
- Perch of the Devil (1927)
- The Devil's Cage (1928)
- Green Grass Widows (1928)
- The Farmer's Daughter (1928)
- Harold Teen (1928)
- Why Be Good? (1929)
- Tanned Legs (1929)
- The Woman Between (1931)
- Billboard Girl (1932)
- Sailor Be Good (1933)
