= A Homespun Vamp =

1922 film by Frank O'Connor

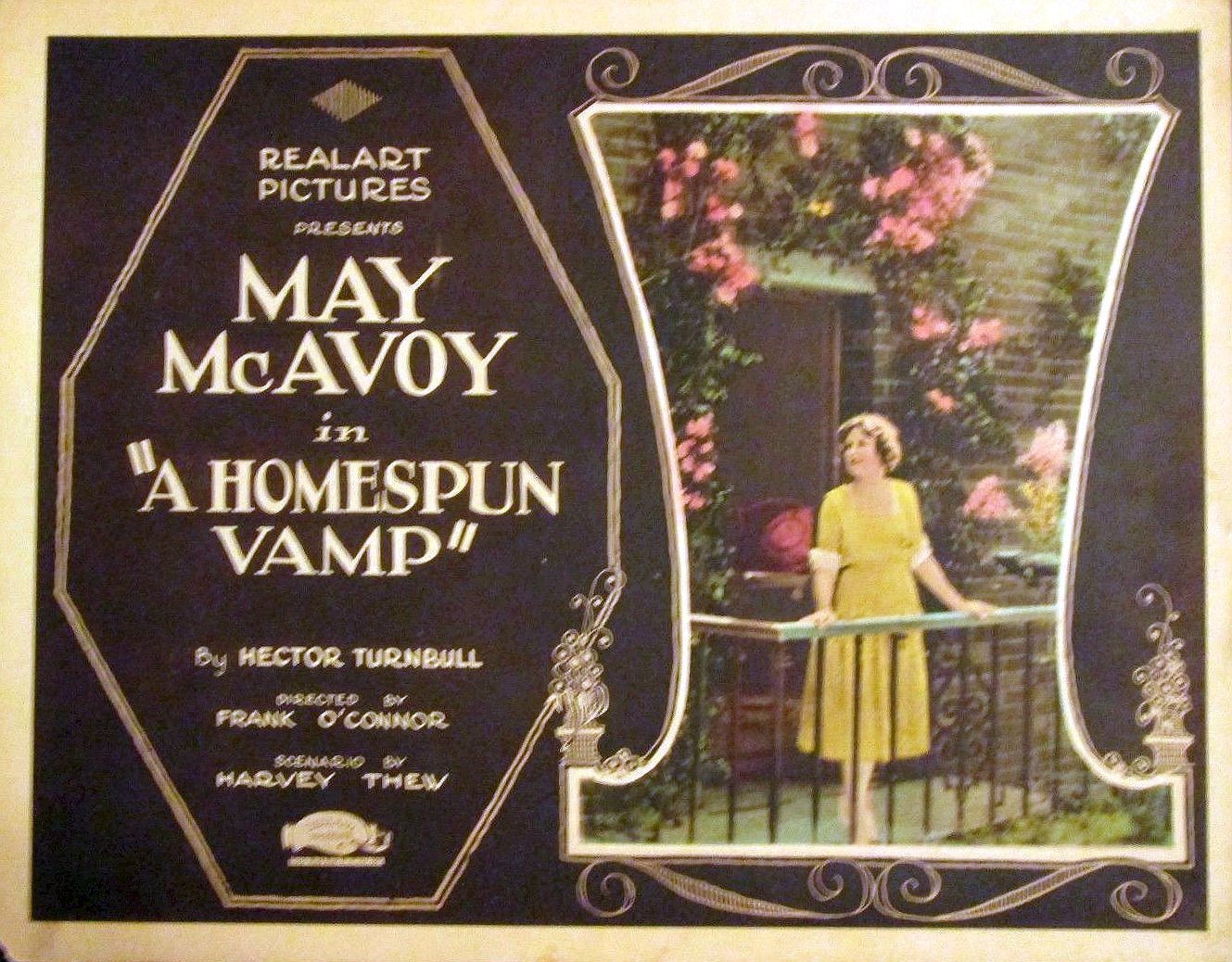
- Lobby card
- Directed by: Frank O'Connor
- Screenplay by: Harvey F. Thew; Hector Turnbull
- Starring: May McAvoy; Darrell Foss; Lincoln Stedman; Josephine Crowell; Charles Stanton Ogle; Guy Oliver; Helen Dunbar
- Cinematography: Harold Rosson
- Production company: Realart Pictures Corporation
- Distributed by: Paramount Pictures
- Release date: February 12, 1922
- Running time: 50 minutes
- Country: United States
- Language: Silent (English intertitles)

A Homespun Vamp is a 1922 American silent drama film directed by Frank O'Connor and written by Harvey F. Thew and Hector Turnbull. The film stars May McAvoy, Darrell Foss, Lincoln Stedman, Josephine Crowell, Charles Stanton Ogle, Guy Oliver and Helen Dunbar. The film was released on February 12, 1922, by Paramount Pictures.

== Plot ==
As described in a film magazine, Meg Mackenzie is the orphaned niece of two crabbed, stingy old men, Donald and Duncan Craig, brothers in a small country town. They force her to become engaged to Joe Dobbs, assistant to his mother who runs the village blacksmith shop. Stephen Ware, who is writing a novel in a shack nearby, is accused of robbing the post office and hides in the Craig home overnight while the two brothers are away. When the brothers return, they force Meg to marry Stephen at once. The real burglar is discovered and Stephen's name is cleared. Meg discovers that she actually loves Stephen, and wins him away from Beatrice Carlisle, a young woman he had been engaged to. She also gives him the inspiration for the concluding chapter in his novel.

== Cast ==
- May McAvoy as Meg Mackenzie
- Darrell Foss as Stephen Ware
- Lincoln Stedman as Joe Dobbs
- Josephine Crowell as Mrs. Dobbs
- Charles Stanton Ogle as Donald Craig
- Guy Oliver as Duncan Craig
- Helen Dunbar as Mrs. Ware
- Kathleen Kirkham as Beatrice Carlisle

== Preservation status ==
A Homespun Vamp is now lost.
