= Robert Brower =

American actor (1850–1934)

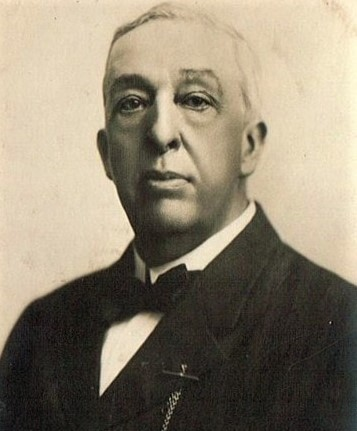
Publicity still of Robert Brower

Robert Brower (July 14, 1850 – December 8, 1934) was an actor who appeared in many American films. He appeared in several Edison films. He was lauded for his "characterizations" including in Apples of Sodom.

Brower was born in Point Pleasant, New Jersey. While in his teens he performed in theater.

== Filmography ==
- Aida (1911) as High Priest of Isis
- Silver Threads Among the Gold (1911)
- The Librarian (1912, Short) as Judge Binney
- Hearts and Diamonds (1912)
- The Shadow on the Blind (1912)
- Helping John (1912)
- The Ambassador's Daughter (1913)
- Apples of Sodom (1913)
- Dolly Varden (1913)
- The Diamond Crown (1913) as Inspector Dalton
- The Substitute Stenographer (1913) as the Police Inspector
- The Mystery of the Fadeless Tints (1914) as Detective Narko
- The Mystery of the Glass Tubes (1914) as Detective Narko
- The Vanishing Cracksman (1914) as Detective Narko
- Vanity Fair (1915) as Mr. Osborne
- When Love Is King (1916) as The Prime Minister
- Builders of Castles (1917) as The Builder
- The Tell-Tale Step (1917) as Doctor Oppenheim Bertellini
- The Mystery of the Double Cross (1917) as Herbert Brewster
- Something to Do (1919) as Mr. Remwick
- The Beauty Market (1919) as Amelia's Uncle Issacs
- Rose o' the River (1919) as Grandfather Wiley
- Hawthorne of the U.S.A. (1919) as De Witz
- Everywoman (1919) as Age
- The Heart of Youth (1919) as The Squire
- Held by the Enemy (1920) as Uncle Rufus
- A Cumberland Romance (1920) as Mountain Bishop
- Jack Straw (1920) as Count of Pomerania
- A City Sparrow (1920) as Parson Neil
- Peck's Bad Boy (1921) as The Minister (uncredited)
- The Little Minister (1921) as Hendry Munn
- The Jucklins (1921) as Attorney Conkwright
- What Every Woman Knows (1921) as Scot Lawyer
- The Lost Romance (1921) as Butler
- The Faith Healer (1921) as Dr. Martin
- Is Matrimony a Failure? (1922) as Marriage License Clerk
- The Man Who Saw Tomorrow (1922) as Bishop
- Thirty Days (1922) as Professor Huxley
- Singed Wings (1922) as Don José della Guerda
- Fools First (1922) as Butler
- Racing Hearts (1923) as Horatio Whipple
- Adam's Rib (1923) as Hugo Kermaier
- Long Live the King (1923) as The King
- Fifth Avenue Models (1924) as Art Salesman
- Riders Up (1924) as General Jeff
- The Thoroughbred (1925)
- Wild Oats Lane (1926) as The Kleptomaniac
- Home Cured (1926) (uncredited)
- The Honeymoon Express (1926) as Dick Donaldson
- The Gay Defender (1927) as Ferdinand Murrieta
- The Last Trail (1927) as Sam Beasley
- Beggars of Life (1928) as Blind Sims (uncredited)
- Abraham Lincoln (1930) (uncredited)
- Blind Adventure (1933) as Hotel Dining Guest (uncredited)
- The Invisible Man (1933) as Farmer (uncredited)
