= The Mystery of Temple Court =

- Produced by: Vitagraph Company of America
- Distributed by: Vitagraph
- Release date: March 18, 1910
- Country: USA
- Language: Silent..English titles

The Mystery of Temple Court is a surviving 1910 silent film drama short produced and distributed by the Vitagraph Company of America.

The film survives in the Library of Congress collection.
