= George Bronson Howard =

American writer

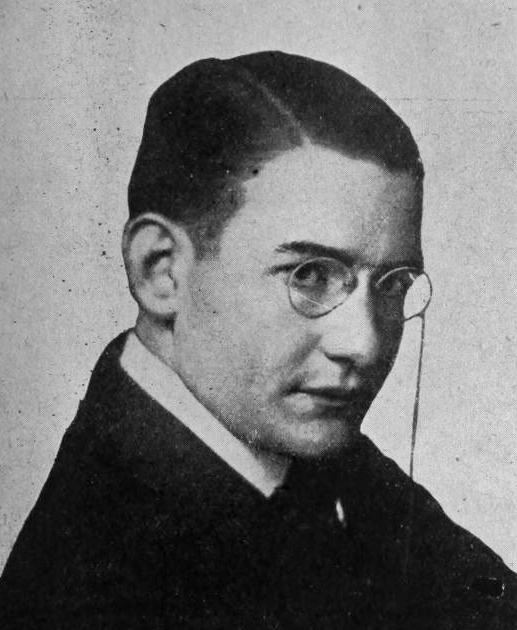
George Bronson Howard

George Bronson-Howard (January 7, 1884 – November 20, 1922) was an American writer. Several of his works were made into films.

Some of Bronson's books were adorned by artwork on the frontispiece and some were illustrated by artists including Paul Stahr and Arthur Covey.

He is also credited with lyrics and as a writer of several Broadway plays including Snobs (1911). Snobs was made into a film in 1915.

He featured a spy character named Yorke Norroy in a series of works appearing in serial form in magazines and books.

Bronson's death in Los Angeles, California by apparent suicide was on November 20, 1922.

== Bibliography ==
- Norroy, Diplomatic Agent (1907)
- Scars on the Southern Seas, a romance, B. W. Dodge & Company 1907
- The Red Light of Mars or A Day in the Life of the Devil, published by Mitchell Kennerley, New York, 1913
- God's Man, 1915
- Slaves of the Lamp: Being the Adventures of Yorke Norroy in His Quest of the Four Jade Plates
- Bird of Prey: Being Pages from the Book of Broadway (1918)
- An enemy to society: a romance of yesterday and today, illustrated by Arthur S. Covey, Doubleday 1911
- The devil's book: being the full account of how the Book of the Betrayers came into the hands of Yorke Norroy, secret agent of the Department of State, frontispiece by Paul Stahr, W. J. Watt & Company 1920
- The Devil's Chaplain (1922)

== Filmography ==
- Snobs (1915 film)
- The Social Pirates (1916)
- The Perils of the Secret Service (1917), director
- God's Man (1917)
- Don't Shoot (1922)
- Borrowed Finery (1925)
- The Man from Headquarters (1928), wrote the novel
