= God's Man (film) =

1917 silent film

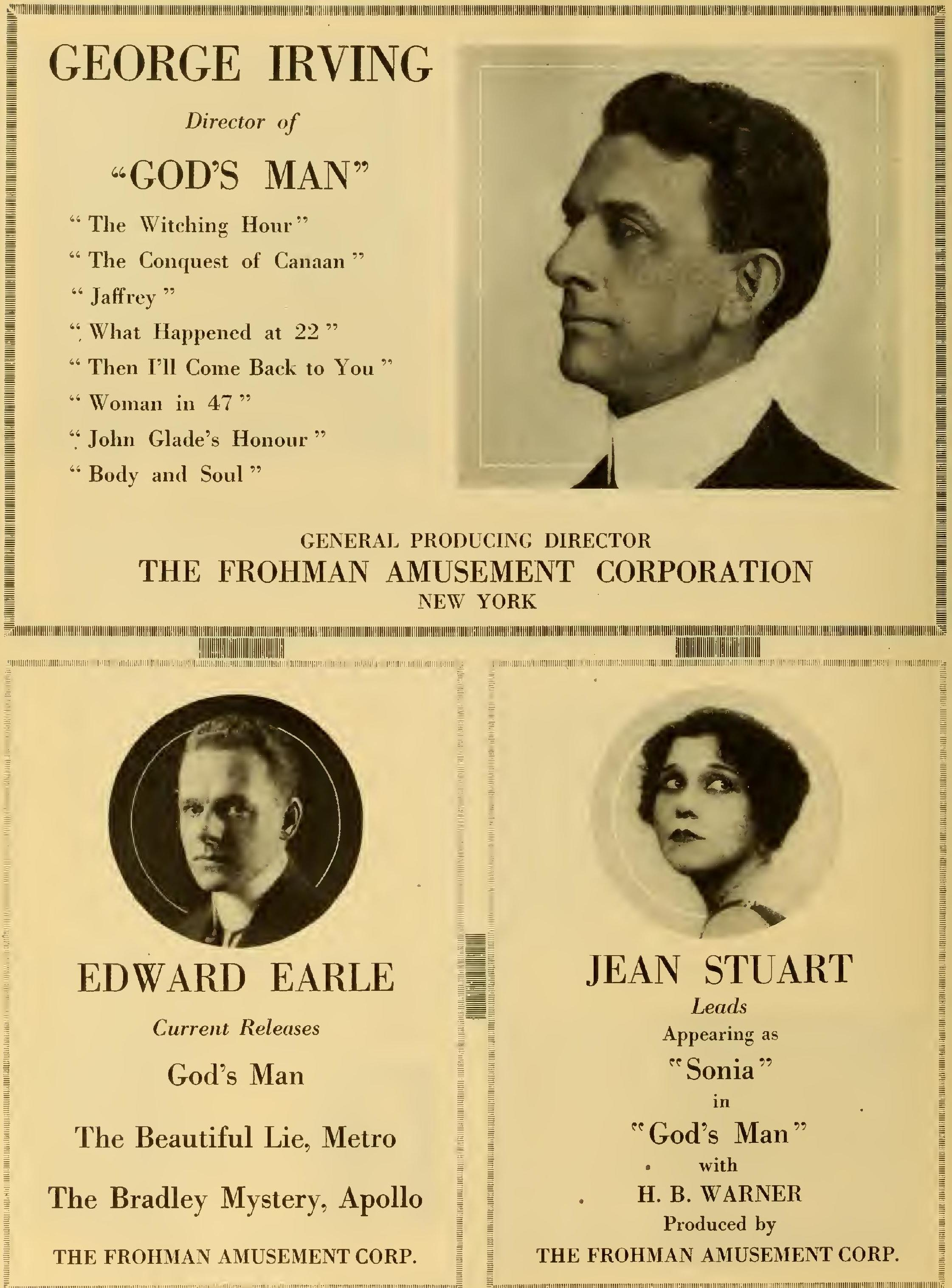
- Directed by: George Irving
- Written by: George Bronson Howard (novel); Anthony Paul Kelly
- Produced by: William L. Sherrill
- Starring: H.B. Warner; Kate Lester; Albert Tavernier
- Cinematography: William A. Reinhart
- Production company: Frohman Amusement Corporation
- Distributed by: Metro Pictures
- Release date: April 1917
- Running time: 90 minutes
- Country: United States
- Languages: Silent; English intertitles

God's Man is a 1917 American silent drama film directed by George Irving and starring H.B. Warner, Kate Lester and Albert Tavernier. It is based on the novel of the same title by George Bronson Howard.

== Cast ==
- H.B. Warner as Arnold L'Hommedieu
- Kate Lester as Mrs. L'Hommedieu
- Albert Tavernier as Richard L'Hommedieu
- Stanhope Wheatcroft as Paul L'Hommedieu
- Barbara Castleton as Bertie
- Barbara Gilroy as Eunice
- Sydney Vorzimer as Hans
- Edward Earle as Archie Hartogensis
- Harry B. Eytinge as Hartogesis Sr.
- Mario Fouche as Carol Cato
- Ricca Allen as Mrs. Pickens
- Walter Hiers as Hugo Waldemar
- William Frederic as Joh Waldemar
- Tom Burrough as The Philosopher
- Marion Cumming as The Philosopher's Niece
- Maud de Vere as Mother Mybus
- Jean Stuart as Sonia
- Jack Sherrill as Pink
- Daniel Jarrett as Beau
- Sidney D'Albrook as Quimby Quivvers

== Bibliography ==
- Goble, Alan. The Complete Index to Literary Sources in Film. Walter de Gruyter, 1999.
