= Thomas Kurihara =

Japanese actor and film director

Thomas Kurihara トーマス・栗原
- Born: 24 January 1885; Hadano, Kanagawa, Japan
- Died: 8 September 1926 (aged 41); Tokyo, Japan
- Other names: 栗原喜三郎
- Occupations: actor, film director
- Years active: 1914–1923

Thomas Kurihara (トーマス・栗原, Thomas Kurihara; 24 January 1885 – 8 September 1926) was a Japanese actor and film director.

== Life ==
Thomas Kurihara, birth name Kisaburō Kurihara (栗原喜三郎), was born in Hadano, Kanagawa. Kurihara's father was a wood trader, but he failed in business. Kurihara went to United States and enrolled in a school for film actors in 1912. After graduation, working as an extra, he entered director Thomas Ince's Oriental Production Company, which Ince founded to feature Asian actors. There he worked with Sesshu Hayakawa, Tsuruko Aoki, Goro Kino and many other Japanese actors. Performance of Takeo in The Wrath of the Gods (1914) made him famous.

Hoping to work film industry in his country, Kurihara went back to Japan in 1918, and entered Taishō Katsuei in April 1920, a film production which Ryozō Asano of Asano zaibatsu (Kurihara's acquaintance) founded at Yamashita-cho, Yokohama. There he started his career as film director. His first work at Taisho was Amateur Club (1920), which Junichiro Tanizaki joined as a film writer.

Until Taisho Katsudo Eiga stopped to making films in 1922 Kurihara made more than 30 films. He also taught many film directors and actors: Tomu Uchida, Kintaro Inoue and Buntaro Futagawa; Tokihiko Okada, Michiko Hayama, Ureo Egawa and Atsushi Watanabe.

Kurihara died on 8 September 1926 at the age of 41.

== Filmography ==
=== as an actor ===
- Gokurakutô no joô (The Queen of Paradice Island) (1925)
- Zoku Amateur Club (Amateur Club: part two) (1923)
- Shitakiri Suzume (Sparrow's Inn) (1923)
- Kurueru Akuma (A Crazy Devil) (1921)
- Jasei no in (A Serpent's Lust) (1921)
- The Miracle Man uncredited
- The Bravest Way (1918)
- The Honor of His House (1918)
- The Curse of Iku (1918)
- The Hopper (1918)
- Her American Husband (1918)
- Wolves of the Rail (1918)
- Hashimura Togo (1917)
- The Square Deal Man (1917)
- The Devil's Double (1916 film)
- The Soul of Kura San (1916)
- The Forbidden Adventure (1915)
- Over Secret Wires (1915)
- The Grudge (1915)
- The Bride of Guadaloupe (1915)
- In the Sage Brush Country (1914)
- The Fortunes of War (1914)
- The Vigil (1914)
- The Typhoon (1914)
- A Tale of the Northwest Mounted (1914)
- The Curse of Caste (1914)
- The Wrath of the Gods (1914)
- Shorty's Trip to Mexico (1914)
- The Ambassador's Envoy (1914)
- The Courtship of O San (1914)
- O Mimi San (1914)

=== as a film director ===
- Haru wa kaeru (Spring comes back) (1924)
- Zoku Amateur Club (1923)
- Yume no tabiji (The Dream of Orient) (1921)
- Narikin (Sanji Goto - The Story of Japanese Enoch Arden) (1921)
- Kashu Daigaku Yakyudan Raicho-sen Jokkyo (Report on the Friendly Match versus California State College Baseball Team) (1921)
- Kisen Houshi (Kisen the Monk) (1921)
- Shuppan mae kai shimon (1921)
- Beikoku Kyokugei Hikou (1921)
- Hinamatsuri no yoru (Night of Doll Festival) (1921)
- Kami no Setsuri (The Providence of God) (1921)
- Goman-en (Fifty thousand Yen) (1921)
- Doro no Sainan (1921)
- Ganjitsu no Satsuei (Shots on New Year Day) (1921)
- Jasei no in (A Serpent's Lust) (1921)
- Meiji Junguu Chinzasai (1920)
- Goto Sanji (1920)
- Katsushika Sunako (1920)
- Utsukushiki Nippon (Japan: the beautiful) (1920)
- Amateur Club (1920)

=== as a film writer ===
- Haru wa kaeru (1924)
- Yume no tabiji (The Dream of Orient) (1921)
