= The Typhoon =

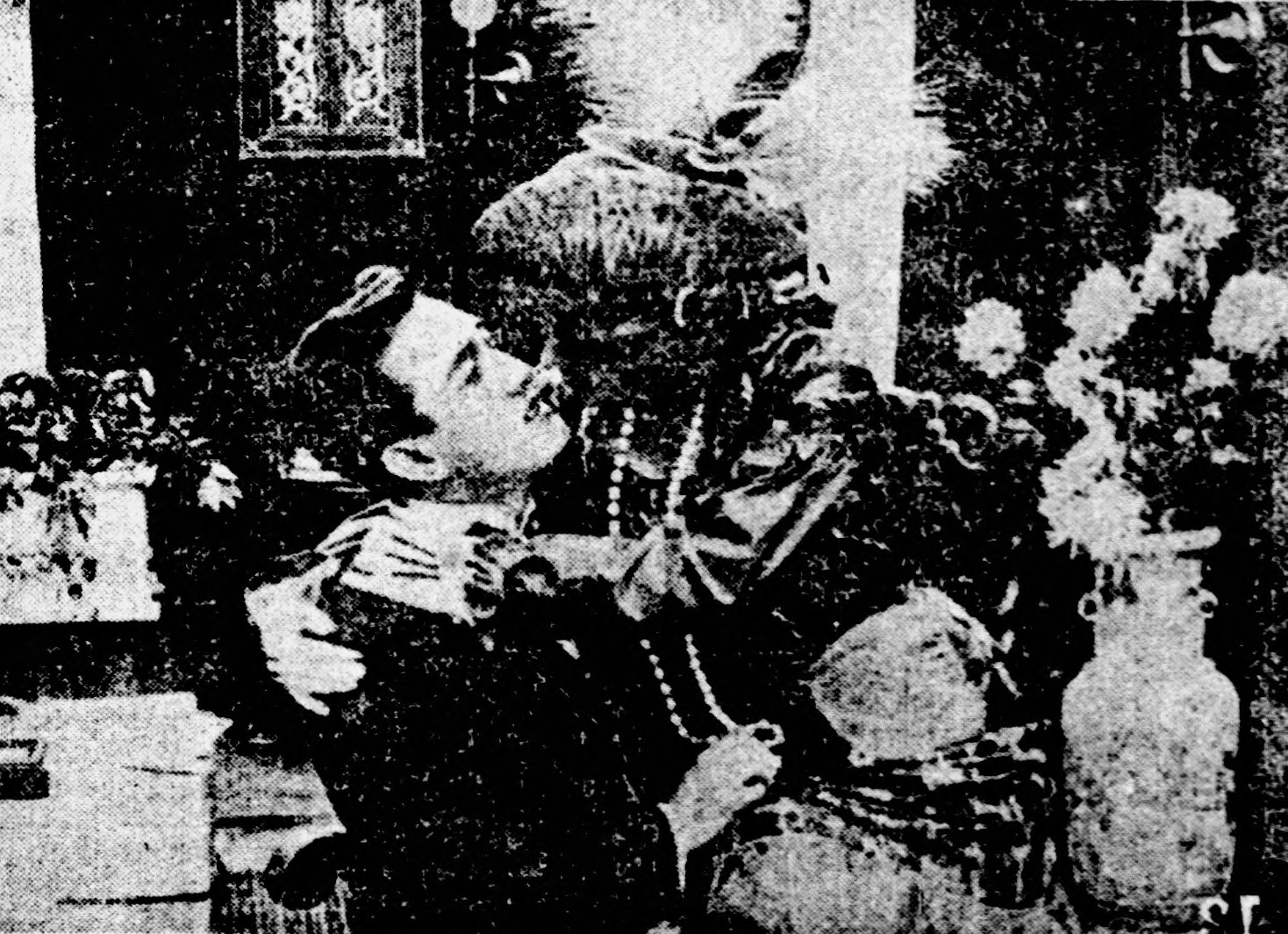
- Scene from the film.
- Directed by: Reginald Barker
- Screenplay by: Melchior Lengyel
- Produced by: Thomas H. Ince
- Starring: Sessue Hayakawa; Gladys Brockwell; Frank Borzage; Henry Kotani; Leona Hutton
- Production company: New York Motion Picture Company
- Distributed by: Paramount Pictures
- Release date: October 10, 1914
- Running time: 50 minutes
- Country: United States
- Language: Silent (English intertitles)

The Typhoon is a 1914 American silent drama film directed by Reginald Barker, written by Melchior Lengyel, and starring Sessue Hayakawa, Gladys Brockwell, Frank Borzage, Henry Kotani and Leona Hutton. It was released on October 10, 1914, by Paramount Pictures. A print exists at the George Eastman Museum film archive

== Plot ==
According to a film magazine, "Tokoramo has been sent to Paris by his country to secure the plans of the French military forces. His work is interfered with by the visits to his office of Helene, a chorus girl with whom he has fallen in love. Helene has heartlessly thrown over her fiance Bernisky for the new and interesting [Japanese man], and meanwhile Toko's countrymen in Paris have been informed by their spy of Helene's visits. Tokoramo endeavors to keep Helene from coming because he is working day and night; but to no avail. She continues to visit his apartments against his wishes, and one day while there her rejected sweetheart forces his way past the servant into Toko's room. Toko quickly hides Helene behind a curtain, where she listens to her own denunciation and exposure from the lips of the man she has so lightly deserted. When Bernisky departs: Toko brings Helene from her hiding-place and bids her go forever, but she pleads passionately to remain. Toko will not listen and demands that she leave at once. Helene starts, and Toko, realizing how much he cares for her, calls her back. Then she refuses to stay, and in vehement denunciation tells him she will go back to Bernisky and laughs at him — calls him a "yellow rat" and bids him return to his yellow country from whence he came. This enrages Toko, and he strangles Helene to death and leaves her lying lifeless on his bed.

The remainder of the story shows graphically how Toko's countrymen rally for their country. Toko must do his work — one of them must plead guilty. This lot is chosen by Hironari, a mere boy, who is finally guillotined. In the end and as Toko has completed his work, he too dies, and the valuable papers are burned to escape detection just as the police are breaking into the apartment. The scene shows the vain sacrifice that has been made by the Japanese for the sake of Nippon."

== Cast ==
- Sessue Hayakawa as Tokorama
- Gladys Brockwell as Helene
- Frank Borzage as Renard Bernisky
- Henry Kotani as Hironari
- Leona Hutton as Theresa
- Kisaburo Kurihara as Baron Joshikawa
- Tsuru Aoki

== See also ==
- Typhoon (1933)
