= Until They Get Me =

- Directed by: Frank Borzage
- Cinematography: C. H. Wales
- Distributed by: Triangle Film Corporation
- Release date: 1917
- Country: United States
- Language: English intertitles

Until They Get Me is a 1917 American Western drama film directed by Frank Borzage. The film is in the public domain in the United States today due to copyright expiration.

== Plot ==
While on his way to visit his wife on her deathbed, Kirby is forced to kill a man in self-defense. He is stopped by Selwyn, a member of the North West Mounted Police, who allows him to go and say a final goodbye to his wife. After going there, Kirby escapes Selwyn and becomes a fugitive. Every year he returns to visit his son, and during one of these stays he meets Margy, a young farm girl who has run away to escape this life of drudgery. Kirby helps her cross the border into Canada where she is adopted by the Mounted Police.

Years later, Margy and Selwyn fall in love and he tells her the story of this man who escaped her by showing his portrait to Margy. In all innocence, Margy allows Selwyn to find out about Kirby's annual visits to her son, and the fugitive is arrested. However, with the help of Selwyn and Margy, he proves he acted in self-defense, and all ends well when Kirby is finally acquitted.
