= Queen of the Night Clubs =

1929 film

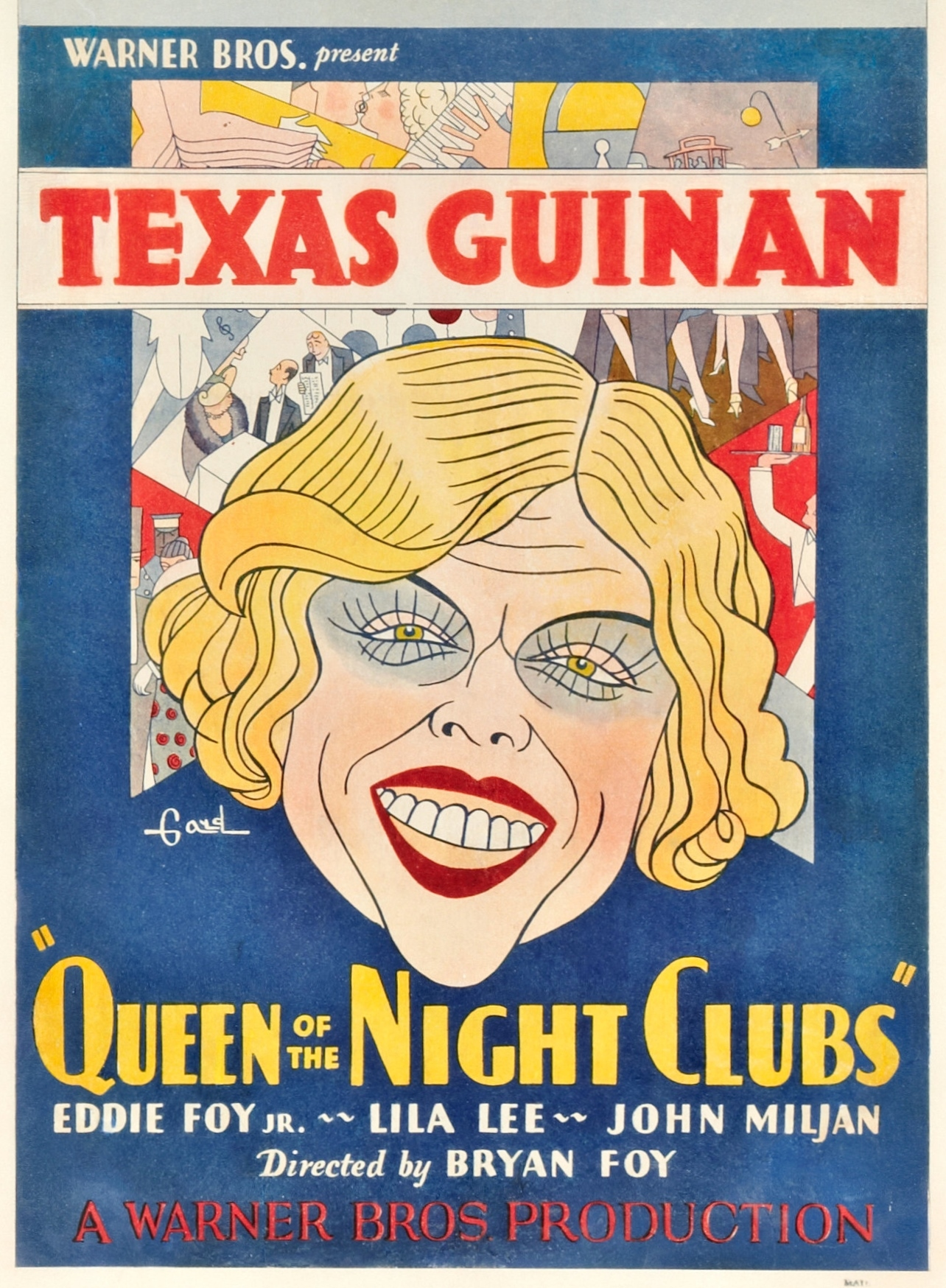
- Theatrical release poster
- Directed by: Bryan Foy
- Written by: Addison Burkhard; Murray Roth
- Produced by: Bryan Foy
- Starring: Texas Guinan; John Davidson; Lila Lee; John Miljan; Arthur Housman; Eddie Foy Jr. Jack Norworth; George Raft
- Cinematography: Edwin B. DuPar
- Production company: Warner Bros. Pictures
- Distributed by: Warner Bros. Pictures
- Release date: March 16, 1929
- Running time: 60 minutes
- Country: United States
- Language: English
- Budget: $131,000
- Box office: $472,000

Queen of the Night Clubs is a 1929 American sound (All-Talking) Pre-Code musical drama film produced and directed by Bryan Foy, distributed by Warner Bros. Pictures, and starred legendary nightclub hostess Texas Guinan. The picture, which featured appearances by Eddie Foy Jr., Lila Lee, and George Raft, is now considered a lost film. A mute print of the original trailer exists at the Library of Congress. In addition to this, an unofficial movie trailer for this film exists and displays no clips from the feature. This unofficial trailer was apparently made by a cinema advertising company.

== Plot ==
After working as a hostess for Nick and Andy, Tex Malone leaves their employ and opens a club of her own. Looking for talent to book for the floor show, Tex hires Bee Walters and thereby breaks up Bee's act with Eddie Parr.

Andy spitefully kills Tex's friend, Holland, and young Eddie is arrested for the crime on circumstantial evidence. Tex then learns from Eddie's father, Phil, that Eddie is her long-lost son.

At the trial, Tex comes to Eddie's defense and persuades one member of the jury that there is reasonable doubt of Eddie's guilt. The jury repairs to Tex's club, where Tex discovers a piece of evidence that conclusively links Andy with the murder. Eddie is freed, and Tex and Phil get together for a second honeymoon.

== Cast ==
- Texas Guinan as "Texas" Malone
- John Davidson as Don Holland
- Lila Lee as Bea Walters
- Arthur Housman as Andy Quinlan
- Eddie Foy Jr. as Eddie Parr
- Jack Norworth as Phil Parr
- George Raft as Gigola
- Jimmy Phillips as Nick
- William B. Davidson as Assistant District Attorney
- John Miljan as Lawyer Grant
- Lee Shumway as Crandall
- Joseph Depew as Roy
- Charlotte Merriam as Girl

== Production ==
The film starred the legendary bar hostess and silent film actress Texas Guinan as "Texas Malone", a character obviously based upon herself.

Warner Bros signed Guinan to make the film on August 15, 1928. Jack Norwood, John Davidson, and Eddie Foy were signed to support her. Filming started in September 1928.

Guinan had recently toured Los Angeles. According to George Raft's obituary, Raft made his movie debut in the film as a dancer, but his scenes were cut from the final film. However Variety did a review which said "nite club scene introduces George Raft, the hot' stepper, as the m. c.and band leader, being brought down for one of his rip-snorting hoofing specialties."

Filming started September 1928. It finished by November.

== Reception ==
The film was generally reviewed as mediocre by critics. Mordaunt Hall of The New York Times called it "a somewhat entertaining thriller", though he found the ending "amateurishly forced".

Variety wrote, "Tex hasn't much to do, but does what she has pretty well... Texas Guinan and "Queen of the Night Clubs" is a double-barreled, come-on at the gate. The' ballyboo potentialities are limitless. Peasants will go for it like unexpurgated literature. "

Film Daily called it "dull and uninteresting", writing, "This film was built solely to give Tex Guinan a chance to show how she runs her Broadway night club, but it has been done so often and so much better in other films of night club life that it carries no kick." John Mosher of The New Yorker expressed disappointment, writing, "Rather to our surprise and much to our regret, Miss Guinan doesn't carry the picture with as much verve as it might seem that she would."

=== Box office ===
According to Warner Bros the film earned $459,000 domestically and $13,000 foreign.

== Censorship ==
Before the silent version of the film could be exhibited in Kansas, the Kansas Board of Review required the elimination of a scene in reel 4, where a man puts a bullet into his revolver and the following shot of his gun emerging from between curtains.

== Preservation status ==
- No film elements are known to exist. The soundtrack, except the first reel, survives on Vitaphone disks.
- A clip from this film featuring Guinan and Raft was incorporated into Winner Take All (1932), an early James Cagney vehicle.
- Brief footage of Guinan, yelling "Hello, suckers!" in a restaurant (or perhaps her nightclub), appears in the 1980s HBO series Yesteryear...1927 hosted by Dick Cavett. This documentary series had Cavett cover a given year out of each decade from 1917 to 1969. Since this episode of Yesteryear was about 1927, the footage of Guinan could be newsreel footage from 1927 or extant 1929 footage from Queen of the Night Clubs (the same footage in Winner Take All).

== See also ==
- List of early sound feature films (1926–1929)
- List of lost films
