= Frohman brothers =

American theatrical producers

The Frohman brothers were American theatre owners, including on Broadway, and theatrical producers who also owned and operated motion picture production companies.

The brothers were:

- Daniel Frohman (1851–1940)
- Gustave Frohman (1854–1930)
- Charles Frohman (1856–1915)

== History ==
Born to a Jewish family from Sandusky, Ohio, the Frohman brothers developed a system of touring theatrical companies that would perform in various parts of the United States. They eventually made their way to New York City in the 1880s where they set up offices that managed bookings for a chain of Western theaters whose operations extended through to California.

Charles Frohman became the representative partner in the Theatrical Syndicate which created a monopoly in 1896 that controlled almost every aspect of theatre contracts and bookings for the next twenty years.

== Film production ==
Daniel Frohman led the brothers business interests into a 1912 partnership with filmmaker Adolph Zukor named the Famous Players Film Company. The new film production company made its first film in 1913, The Prisoner of Zenda and the Frohmans remained involved until 1918 when they parted ways with Zukor after having been part of seventy-four Famous Players productions.

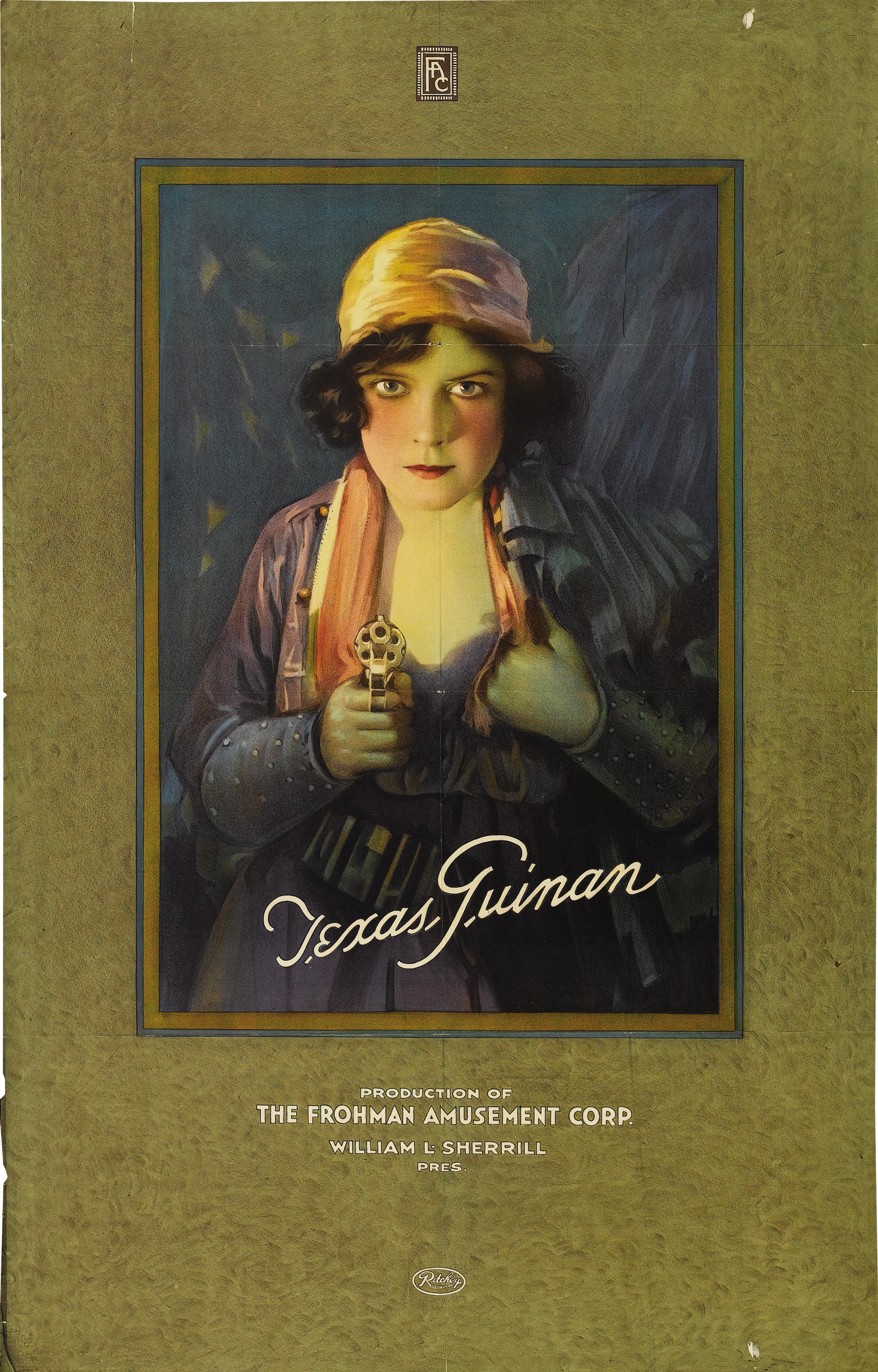
Advertisement for Frohman Amusement Corp featuring Texas Guinan

In 1915 the brothers created Frohman Amusement Corp to be used primarily as a vehicle to make motion pictures from theatrical plays on which they held the rights. A few months after the film company was set up, Charles Frohman died in the sinking of the RMS Lusitania. Brothers Gustave and Daniel assumed control of the theatre operations plus the management of the film production company.

Between its startup in 1915 and 1917, all of the company's films were directed by George Irving.

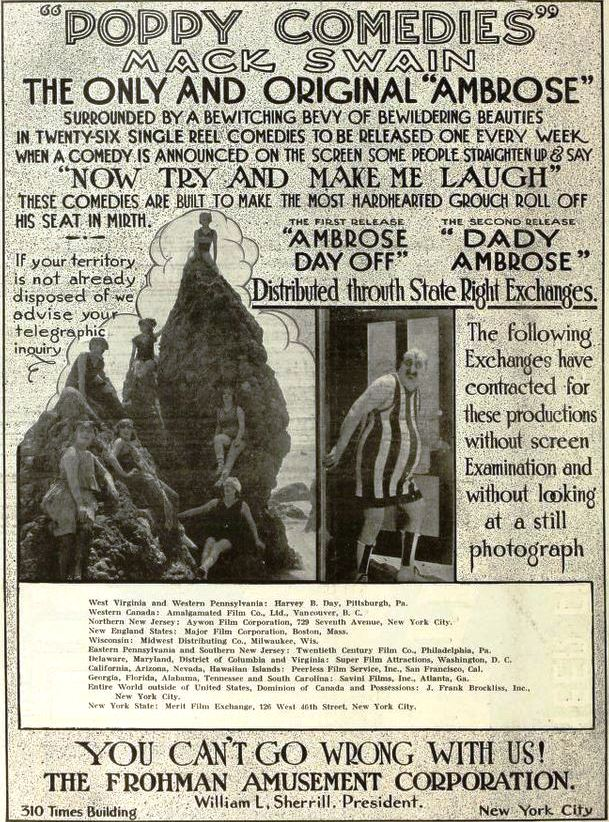
Advertisement for Mack Swain films in Frohman Amusement Corp comedy productions

Until its dissolution in 1920, their film company produced twenty-one motion pictures. William L. Sherrill was a partner in the company. They made more than two dozen two-reel Western films with Texas Guinan in 1918 including The Boss of the Rancho and The Heart of Texas.

=== Filmography ===
- Body and Soul (1915)
- The Conquest of Canaan (1916)
- Then I'll Come Back to You (1916) from the novel by Larry Evans (novelist) starring Alice Brady with Jack Sherrill in a supporting role
- God's Man (1917)
- Once to Every Man (1918)

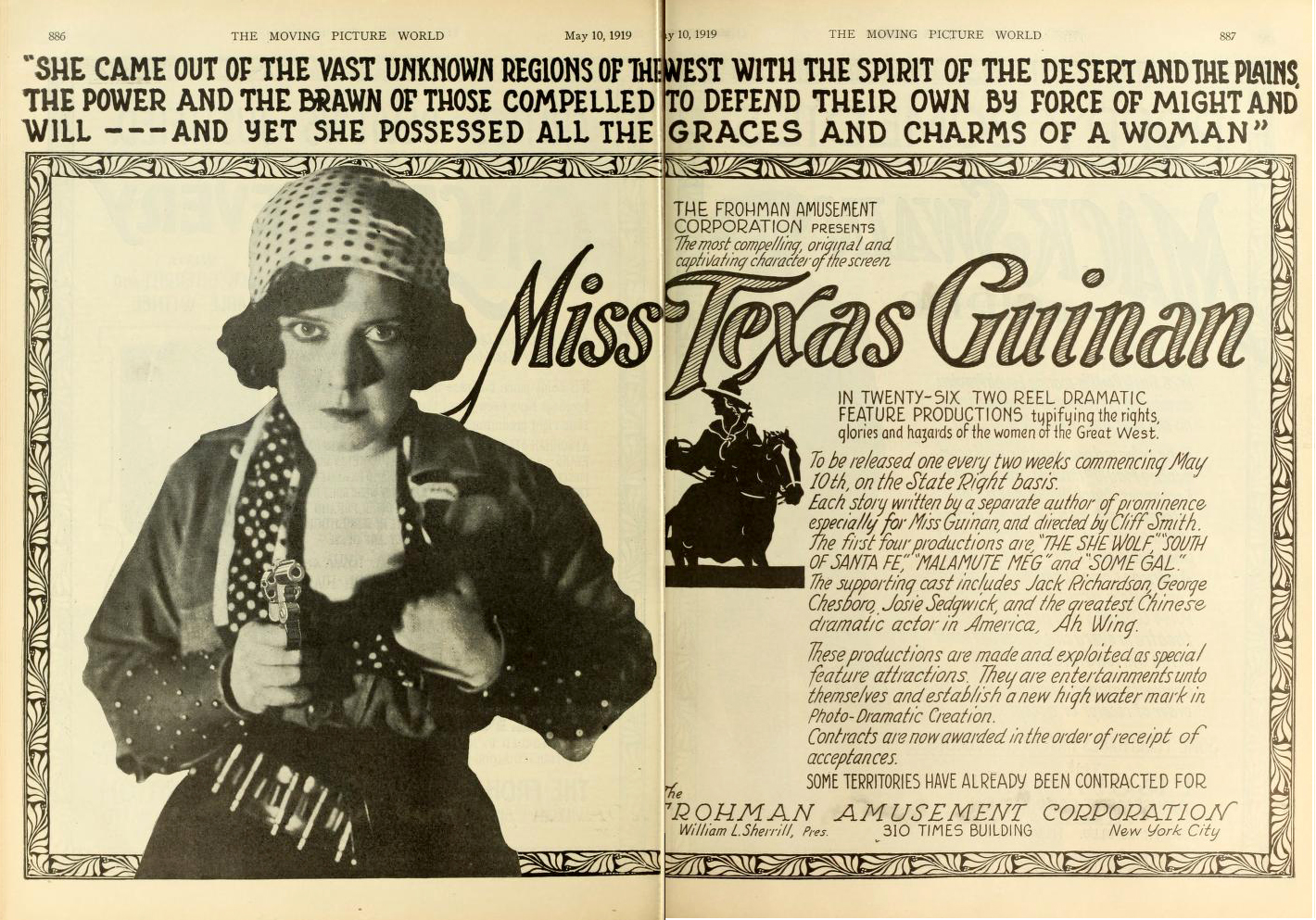
Advertisement for 26 two-reel films starring "Miss Texas Guinan

- The Boss of the Rancho (1919)
- Ambrose's Day Off (1919) starring Mack Swain and bathing beauties
- Daddy Ambrose (1919) starring Mack Swain
- The Girl of Hell's Agony (1919)

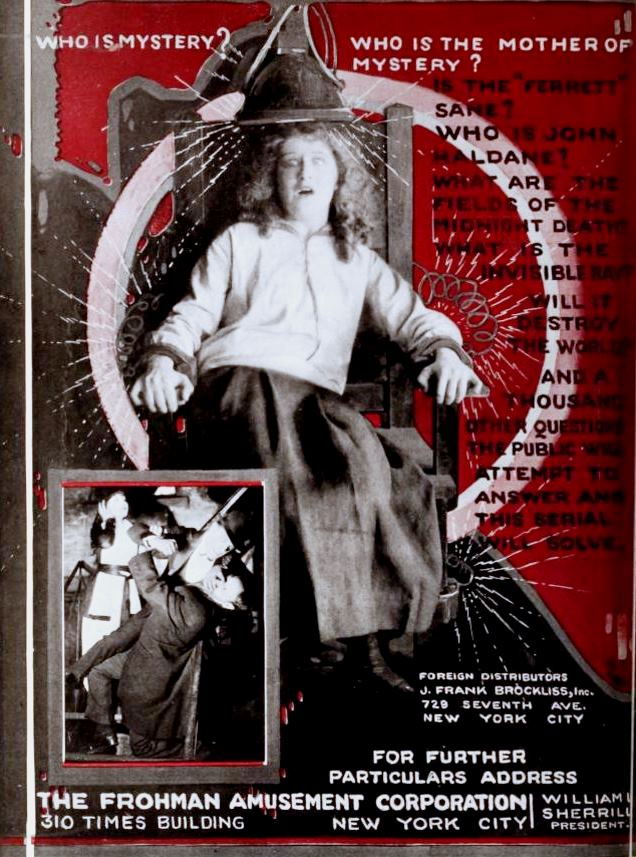
Advertisement for The Invisible Ray

- The Invisible Ray (1920 serial) science fiction serial (1920)

=== Final years ===
Gustave and Daniel Frohman continued producing theatrical plays until the early part of the 1930s. They also managed their theatres until Daniel, the last surviving brother, died in 1940.
