= The Moonshine Feud =

1920 film

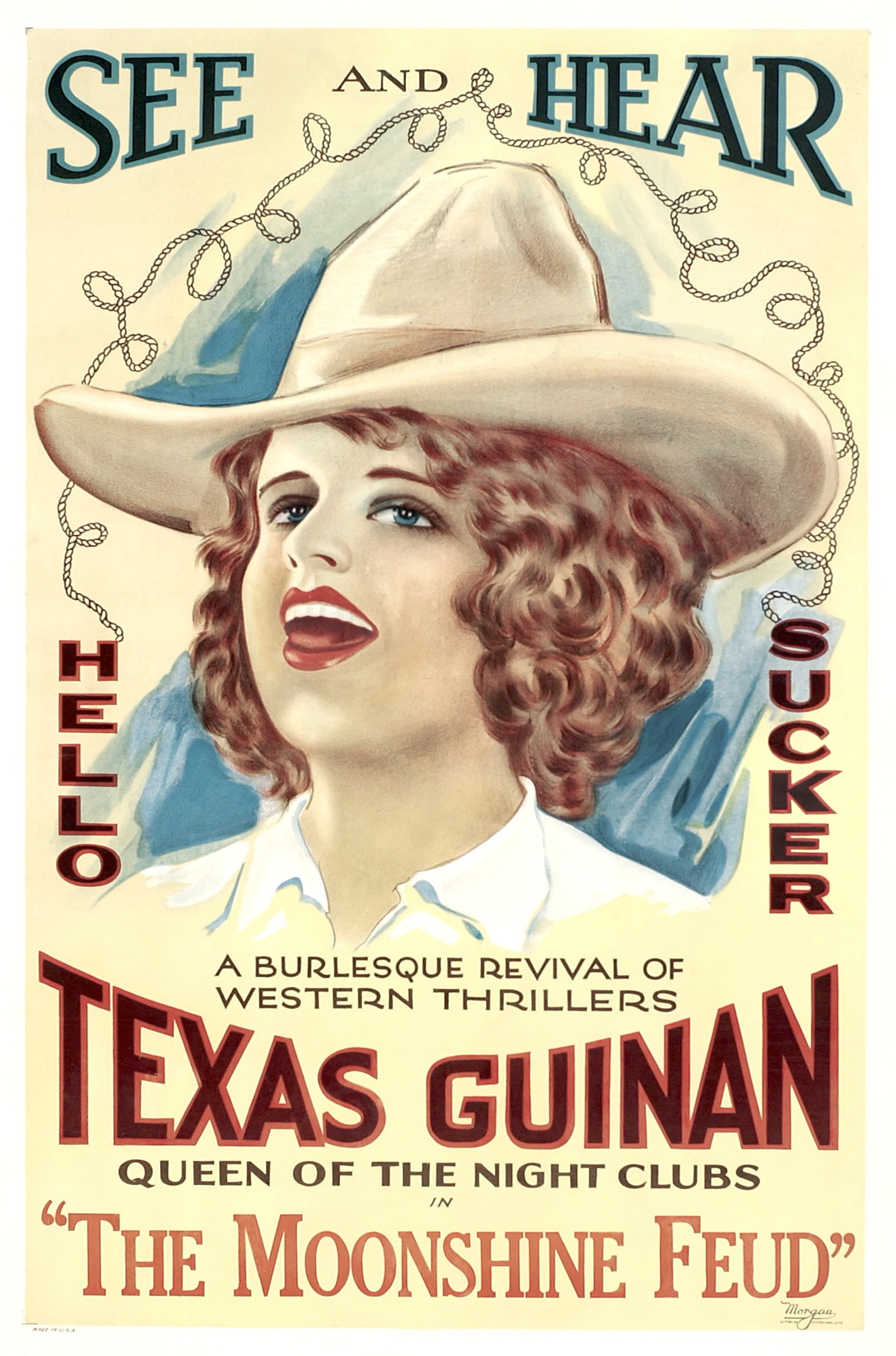
- Contemporary lobby poster. A rerelease of the film with some kind of sound added.
- Produced by: Bull's Eye Productions
- Starring: Texas Guinan
- Distributed by: Reelcraft Pictures
- Release date: 1920
- Running time: 2 reels
- Country: United States
- Languages: Silent; English intertitles

The Moonshine Feud is a 1920 American silent Western film starring Texas Guinan. An abridged 1929 rerelease version is preserved.

== Cast ==
- Texas Guinan
