= Borrowed Finery =

1925 film by Oscar Apfel

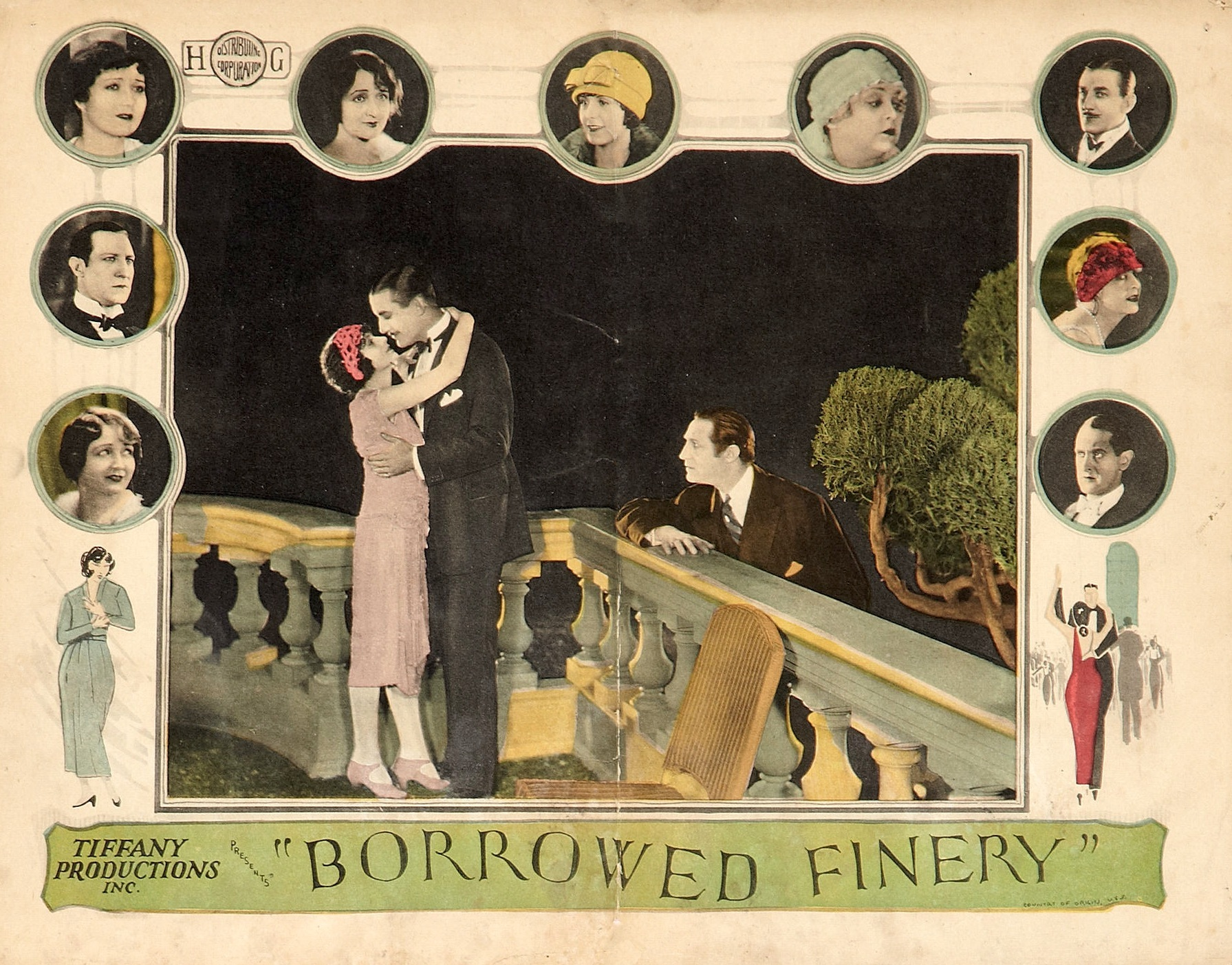
- Lobby card
- Directed by: Oscar Apfel
- Story by: George Bronson Howard
- Starring: Louise Lorraine; Ward Crane; Lou Tellegen
- Distributed by: Tiffany Pictures
- Release date: October 1925
- Running time: 7 reels
- Country: United States
- Language: Silent (English intertitles)

Borrowed Finery is a 1925 American silent drama film produced and released by Tiffany Pictures, and based on a story by George Bronson Howard. Veteran director and performer Oscar Apfel directed a cast that includes Louise Lorraine, Hedda Hopper, Lou Tellegen, and Ward Crane.

== Plot ==
As described in a film magazine review, a mannequin borrows an evening gown from the firm that employs her and ruins it at a party. Then she resigns her position and falls into the hands of an impostor who claims to be a secret service agent. He demands that she obtain from a wealthy woman some jewels on which he insists no duty was paid. She obeys, and then learns from a genuine secret service operative that she has been duped. Together they trap the impostor and, after he is locked up, they make their wedding plans.

== Cast ==
- Louise Lorraine as Sheila Conroy
- Ward Crane as Channing Maynard
- Lou Tellegen as Harlan
- Taylor Holmes as Billy
- Hedda Hopper as Mrs. Bordon
- Gertrude Astor as Maisie
- Trixie Friganza as Mrs. Brown
- Barbara Tennant as Lilly
- Otto Lederer

== Preservation ==
This film was considered a lost film. In late 2016 Czech National Film Archive announced rediscovery of film reels.

== See also ==
- List of rediscovered films
