= Larry Fay =

American organized crime figure

- Criminal charges: none

Details
- Date apprehended: forty-nine arrests

Larry Fay (1888 – January 1, 1933) was one of the early rumrunners of the Prohibition Era in New York City.

== Biography ==
Fay made a half a million dollars bringing bootleg whiskey into New York from Canada. With his profits he bought into a taxi cab company and later opened a nightclub, the El Fey, on West 47th Street in Manhattan in 1924, featuring Texas Guinan as the emcee and a floorshow produced by Nils Granlund. In the 1920s, he married Evelyn Crowell, a Broadway showgirl.

Fay, who had a record of forty-nine arrests but no felony convictions, was involved in several enterprises in the ensuing years, and was said to have amassed and lost a fortune. He was made a partner of the Casa Blanca Club, where he was fatally shot after a 1932 New Year's Eve celebration by the club's doorman Edward Maloney, who had just learned his pay was being reduced by Fay to accommodate a new employee. Fay was 44 years old at the time of his death. After his murder his wife discovered he was broke. In June 1933, Edward Maloney was convicted of first degree manslaughter and sentenced to 8 to 16 years in prison.

On December 15, 1960, The Untouchables television series presented The Larry Fay Story. The second-season episode (and 37th for the series) starred Sam Levene as milk racketeer Larry Fay, an associate of Al Capone, and portrayed Fay's activities in New York City milk price-fixing case. Also, Fay's life served as the basis for James Cagney's character, Eddie Bartlett, in the 1939 gangster film, The Roaring Twenties.
