= Frank Borzage =

American film director and actor (1894–1962)

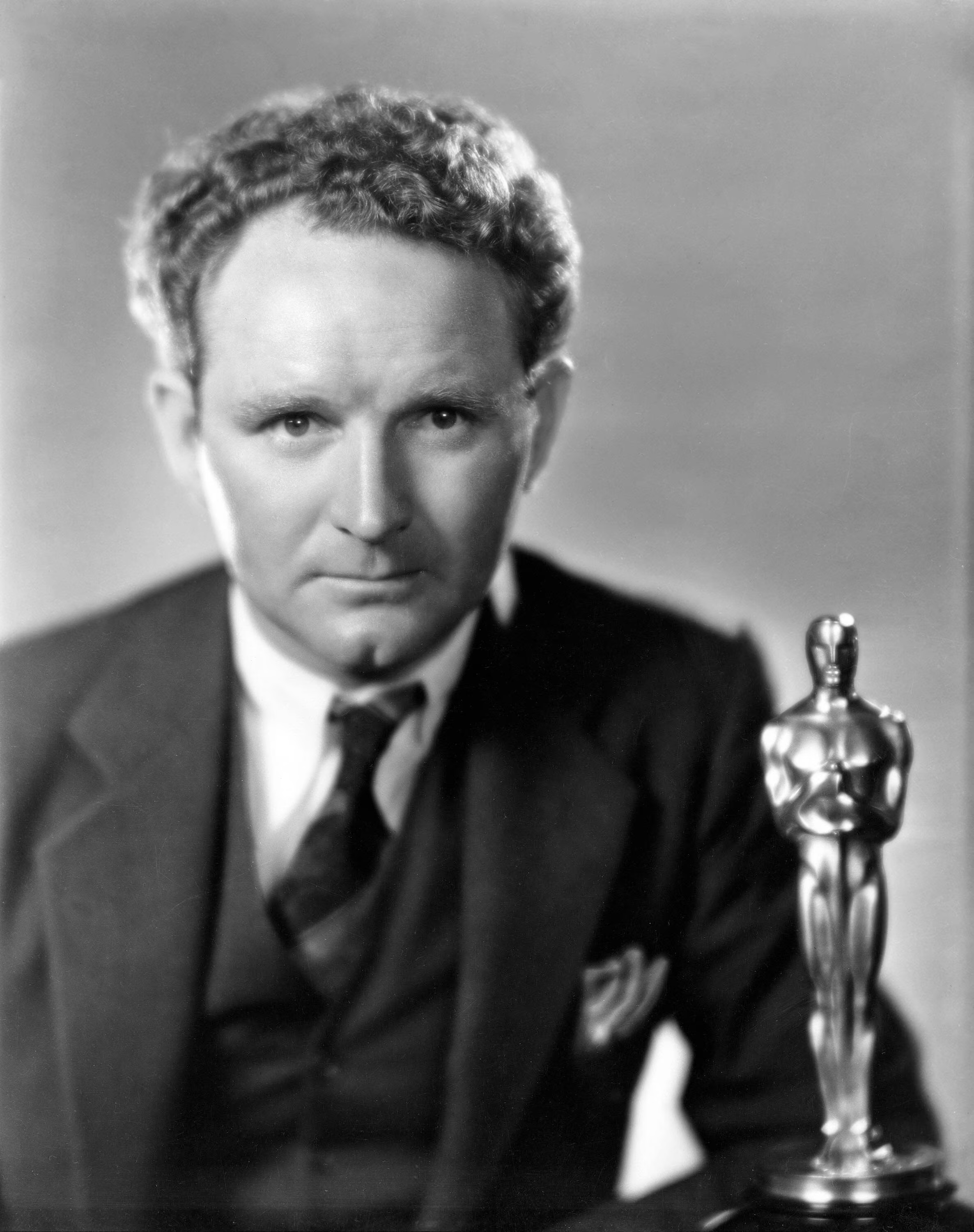
- Borzage with his Academy Award for Best Dramatic Director in 1929
- Born: Frank Borzaga; April 23, 1894; Salt Lake City, Utah, U.S.
- Died: June 19, 1962 (aged 68); Los Angeles, California, U.S.
- Occupations: Film director; actor
- Years active: 1912–1961
- Spouses: Rena Rogers (m. 1916; div. 1941) Edna Stillwell Skelton (m. 1945; div. 1949) Juanita Scott (m. 1953)

Frank Borzage (/bɔːrˈzeɪɡi/ (Note: Borzage told The Literary Digest his name was pronounced "in three syllables, and g in get, bor-zay'gee." (Charles Earle Funk, What's the Name, Please?, Funk & Wagnalls, 1936.)) né Borzaga; April 23, 1894 (Note: To gain a professional advantage in Hollywood, Borzage subtracted a year from his date of birth while still a teenager; many sources thus incorrectly give 1893 as his birth year.) – June 19, 1962) was an American film director and actor. He was the first person to win the Academy Award for Best Director for his film 7th Heaven (1927) at the 1st Academy Awards.

Born to Italian and Swiss immigrant parents in Salt Lake City, Borzage began his career as a teenager performing with traveling theater groups throughout the western United States. He found employment in Hollywood in 1912, where he began directing and acting in short films before transitioning to feature films. Borzage's other directorial feature credits include Street Angel (1928), Bad Girl (1931), A Farewell to Arms (1932), Man's Castle (1933), History Is Made at Night (1937), The Mortal Storm (1940), and Moonrise (1948).

His final credited directorial work is the historical drama The Big Fisherman (1959), before his death from cancer in 1962.

== Biography ==
Borzage was born Frank Borzaga in Salt Lake City, Utah in 1894, to a Swiss mother, Maria (née Ruegg; 1860–1947), and an Italian father, Luigi Borzaga, a stonemason born in 1859 Ronzone (then Austrian Empire). Luigi and Maria met in her native Switzerland while she was employed in a silk factory. The couple emigrated to the United States in the early 1880s, settling in Hazleton, Pennsylvania, where Borzaga worked as a coal miner before the two married in 1883 and relocated to Wyoming before settling in Utah shortly before Frank's birth. Borzage was one of 14 children, eight of whom survived childhood: Henry (1885–1971), Mary Emma (1886–1906), Bill (1892–1973), Frank, Daniel (1896–1975, a performer and member of the John Ford Stock Company), Lew (1898–1974), Dolly (1901–2002) and Sue (1905–1998). Although a Roman Catholic family, the Borzagas had a rapport with the Church of Jesus Christ of Latter-day Saints (LDS Church), and Luigi helped found several LDS temples. Luigi Borzaga died in Los Angeles in a car accident in 1934; his wife Maria (Frank's mother) later died of cancer in 1947.

As a child, Borzage became interested in acting, and while a teenager, took a job mining silver near Park City to save funds to attend a drama school in Salt Lake City. Borzage performed in several traveling theater groups who staged plays throughout the Western United States, including in Montana, Wyoming, Colorado, and Oregon. Around 1912, he joined the Gilmore Brown theater company, which led him to Los Angeles.

=== Career ===
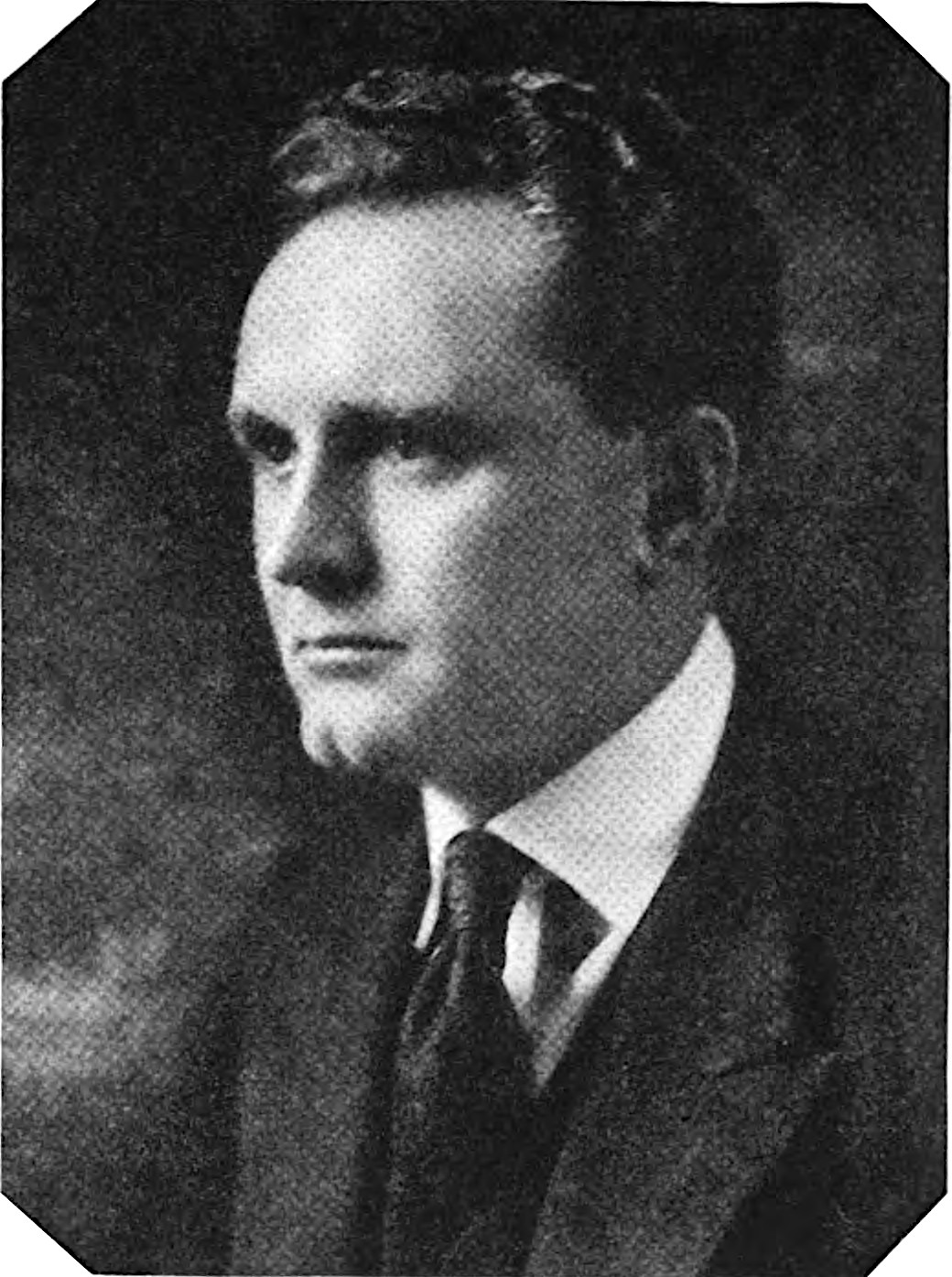
Borzage in Photoplay Magazine, 1920

In 1912, Borzage found employment as an actor in Hollywood; he continued to work as an actor until 1917. His directorial debut came in 1915 with the film The Pitch o' Chance. Borzage was a successful director throughout the 1920s; he reached his peak in the late silent and early sound era. Absorbing visual influences from the German director F. W. Murnau, who was also resident at Fox at this time, he developed his own style of lushly visual romanticism in a hugely successful series of films starring Janet Gaynor and Charles Farrell, including 7th Heaven (1927), for which he won the first Academy Award for Best Director, Street Angel (1928) and Lucky Star (1929). He won a second Oscar for 1931's Bad Girl.

He directed 14 films from 1917 to 1919 alone; his greatest success in the silent era was with Humoresque (1920), a box-office winner starring Vera Gordon.

Borzage's trademark was intense identification with the feelings of young lovers in the face of adversity, with love in his films triumphing over such trials as World War I (7th Heaven and A Farewell to Arms), disability (Lucky Star), the Depression (Man's Castle), a thinly disguised version of the Titanic disaster in History Is Made at Night, and the rise of Nazism, a theme which Borzage had virtually to himself among Hollywood filmmakers, including Little Man, What Now? (1933), Three Comrades (1938), and The Mortal Storm (1940).

His work took a spiritual turn in films such as Green Light (1937), Strange Cargo (1940) and The Big Fisherman (1959). Of his later work, only Moonrise (1948) has enjoyed much critical acclaim.

After 1948, his output was sporadic, but he directed three episodes of the Screen Directors Playhouse television series between 1955 and 1956.

In 1955 and 1957, Borzage was awarded The George Eastman Award, given by George Eastman House for distinguished contribution to the art of film. For his contributions to the film industry, Borzage received a motion pictures star on the Hollywood Walk of Fame in 1960. The star is located at 6300 Hollywood Boulevard.

He was the original director of Journey Beneath the Desert (1961), but was too unwell to continue, and Edgar G. Ulmer took over. Borzage was uncredited for the sequences he did direct.

While hospitalized in February 1962, he received the D. W. Griffith Award.

He was an officer and board member of the Directors Guild of America.

== Personal life ==
On June 7, 1916, Borzage married vaudeville and film actress Lorena "Rena" Rogers in Los Angeles and remained married until 1941. In 1945, he married Edna Stillwell Skelton, the ex-wife of comedian Red Skelton; they were divorced in 1949. His marriage to Juanita Scott in 1953 lasted till his death nine years later.

He was a keen sportsman, with a 3-goal polo handicap and a two handicap in golf, and a yachtsman.

== Death ==
Borzage died in Los Angeles of cancer in 1962, aged 68, and he was interred in the Forest Lawn Memorial Park Cemetery in Glendale, California.

== Filmography ==
=== Director ===
- The Mystery of Yellow Aster Mine (1913)
- The Pitch o' Chance (1915)
- The Pride and the Man (1916)
- Dollars of Dross (1916)
- Life's Harmony (1916)
- The Silken Spider (1916)
- The Code of Honor (1916)
- Two Bits (1916)
- A Flickering Light (1916)
- Unlucky Luke (1916)
- Jack (1916)
- The Pilgrim (1916)
- The Demon of Fear (1916)
- The Quicksands of Deceit (1916)
- Nugget Jim's Pardner (1916)
- That Gal of Burke's (1916)
- The Courtin' of Calliope Clew (1916)
- Nell Dale's Men Folks (1916)
- The Forgotten Prayer (1916)
- Matchin' Jim (1916)
- Land o' Lizards (1916)
- Immediate Lee (1916)
- Flying Colors (1917)
- Until They Get Me (1917)
- A Mormon Maid (1917)
- Wee Lady Betty (1917)
- The Gun Woman (1918)
- The Curse of Iku (1918)
- The Shoes That Danced (1918)
- Innocent's Progress (1918)
- Society for Sale (1918)
- An Honest Man (1918)
- Who Is to Blame? (1918)
- The Ghost Flower (1918)
- The Atom (1918)
- Toton the Apache (1919)
- Whom the Gods Would Destroy (1919)
- Prudence on Broadway (1919)
- Humoresque (1920)
- Get-Rich-Quick Wallingford (1921)
- The Duke of Chimney Butte (1921)
- Back Pay (1922)
- Billy Jim (1922)
- The Good Provider (1922)
- The Valley of Silent Men (1922)
- The Pride of Palomar (1922)
- The Nth Commandment (1923)
- Children of Dust (1923)
- The Age of Desire (1923)
- Secrets (1924)
- The Lady (1925)
- Daddy's Gone A-Hunting (1925)
- The Circle (1925)
- Lazybones (1925)
- Wages for Wives (1925)
- The First Year (1926)
- The Dixie Merchant (1926)
- Early to Wed (1926)
- Marriage License? (1926)
- 7th Heaven (1927)
- Street Angel (1928)
- Lucky Star (1929)
- They Had to See Paris (1929)
- The River (1929)
- Song o' My Heart (1930)
- Liliom (1930)
- Doctors' Wives (1931)
- Young as You Feel (1931)
- Bad Girl (1931)
- After Tomorrow (1932)
- Young America (1932)
- A Farewell to Arms (1932)
- Secrets (1933)
- Man's Castle (1933)
- No Greater Glory (1934)
- Little Man, What Now? (1934)
- Flirtation Walk (1934)
- Living on Velvet (1935)
- Stranded (1935)
- Shipmates Forever (1935)
- Desire (1936)
- Hearts Divided (1936)
- Green Light (1937)
- History Is Made at Night (1937)
- Big City (1937)
- Mannequin (1937)
- Three Comrades (1938)
- The Shining Hour (1938)
- Disputed Passage (1939)
- I Take This Woman (1940)
- Strange Cargo (1940)
- The Mortal Storm (1940)
- Flight Command (1940)
- Billy the Kid (1941)
- Smilin' Through (1941)
- The Vanishing Virginian (1942)
- Seven Sweethearts (1942)
- Stage Door Canteen (1943)
- His Butler's Sister (1943)
- Till We Meet Again (1944)
- The Spanish Main (1945)
- I've Always Loved You (1946)
- Magnificent Doll (1946)
- That's My Man (1947)
- Moonrise (1948)
- China Doll (1958)
- The Big Fisherman (1959)
- Journey Beneath the Desert (1961)

=== Actor ===
- The Battle of Gettysburg (1913) – minor role, uncredited
- The Gratitude of Wanda (1913, short)
- Samson (1914) – Bearded Philistine, uncredited
- The Wrath of the Gods (1914) – Tom Wilson
- The Typhoon (1914) – Renard Bernisky
- The Cup of Life (1915) – Dick Ralston
- Intolerance (1916) – minor role, uncredited
- Land o' Lizards (1916) – The Stranger
- Immediate Lee (1916) – Immediate Lee
- The Pride and the Man (1916)
- A School for Husbands (1917) – Hugh Aslam
- A Mormon Maid (1917) – Tom Rigdon
- Wee Lady Betty (1917) – Roger O'Reilly
- Flying Colors (1917) – uncredited
- Fear Not (1917) – Franklin Shirley
- The Gun Woman (1918) – Townsman – uncredited
- The Curse of Iku (1918) – Allan Carroll / Allan Carroll III
- The Atom (1918)
- Jeanne Eagels (1957) – as himself, uncredited

== In popular culture ==
Borzage briefly appears as a character in Horace McCoy's 1935 novel They Shoot Horses, Don't They?, when he attends its dance marathon setting as a spectator. The narrator, Robert Syverten, notices Borzage in the crowd and has a brief conversation with him, expressing his admiration of No Greater Glory and sharing his own ambition to become a film director.

== See also ==
- List of oldest and youngest Academy Award winners and nominees – Youngest winners for Best Director

== Sources ==
- Blum, Daniel (1963). Screen World. New York City, New York: Biblo & Tannen Publishers. ISBN 978-0-819-60304-3.
- Dumont, Hervé (2006). Frank Borzage: the Life and Times of a Hollywood Romantic. Jefferson, North Carolina: McFarland. ISBN 978-1-476-61331-4.
- Herzogenrath, Bernd (2009). The Films of Edgar G. Ulmer. Lanham, Maryland: Scarecrow Press. ISBN 978-0-810-86700-0.
- Lamster, Frederick. "Souls Made Great Through Love and Adversity": the Film Work of Frank Borzage. Scarecrow, 1981.
- McCaffrey, Donald W. (1999). "Films and Filmmakers". In Christopher P. Jacobs (ed.). Guide to the Silent Years of American Cinema. Westport, Connecticut: Greenwood Publishing Group. ISBN 978-0-313-30345-6.
