= The Gun Woman =

1918 film

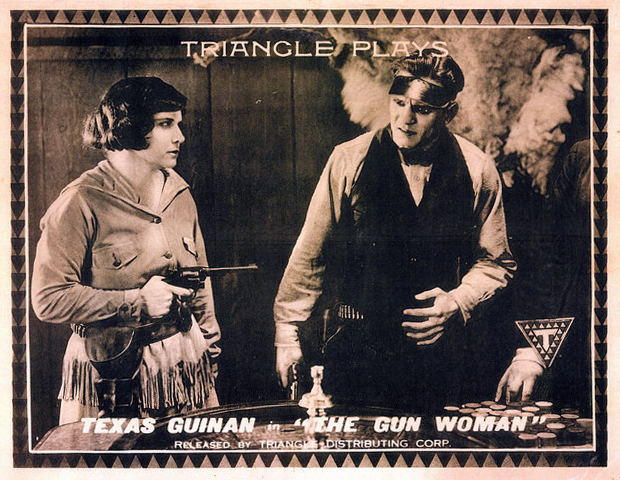
- Directed by: Frank Borzage
- Written by: Alvin J. Neitz
- Produced by: Triangle Film Corporation
- Starring: Texas Guinan
- Cinematography: C.H. Wales; Pliny Horne
- Distributed by: Triangle Distributing
- Release date: January 27, 1918
- Running time: 5 reels
- Country: United States
- Languages: Silent; English intertitles

The Gun Woman is a 1918 American silent Western film directed by Frank Borzage and starring Texas Guinan. It was produced and distributed by the Triangle Film Corporation.

The film is preserved at the Library of Congress.

== Plot ==
As described in a film magazine, the Tigress, who is famous for her quick draw and straight shooting, finds herself softened by love when she meets the Gent and his whisperings of a home for two, which make the Tigress believe in him. She entrusts her savings to his care so that he can prepare a home for them. When she learns that she has been betrayed, she kills the Gent. She buries her love so that when the Bostonian, a detective who had been on the trail of the Gent, offers her his name, she refuses it.

== Cast ==
- Texas Guinan as The Tigress
- Ed Brady as The Bostonian
- Francis McDonald as The Gent
- Walter Perkins as Sheriff Joe Harper
- Thornton Edwards as a Vulture
- George W. Chase as a Vulture

== Reception ==
Like many American films of the time, The Gun Woman was subject to cuts by city and state film censorship boards. For example, the Chicago Board of Censors required a cut, in Reel 1, of three closeups of a coach holdup, two scenes with nude painting, four scenes of woman sitting at bar, two scenes of woman exposing bare back to waist, two scenes of woman standing at bar, two views of nude painting, Reel 2, five scenes with nude painting, three gambling scenes, Reel 3, woman with bare back to waist, five scenes of woman at bar, three scenes of young woman gambling, two scenes with nude painting, three scenes with drunken old man to include view of "Collector" and woman glancing at each other, the intertitle "I've got a hunch" etc., Reel 4, two views of nude painting, woman at bar, Reel 5, four views of large nude painting, five views of small nude painting in young woman's room, intertitle "He's mine by all the laws except those of man", and shooting of man.
