= The Curse of Iku =

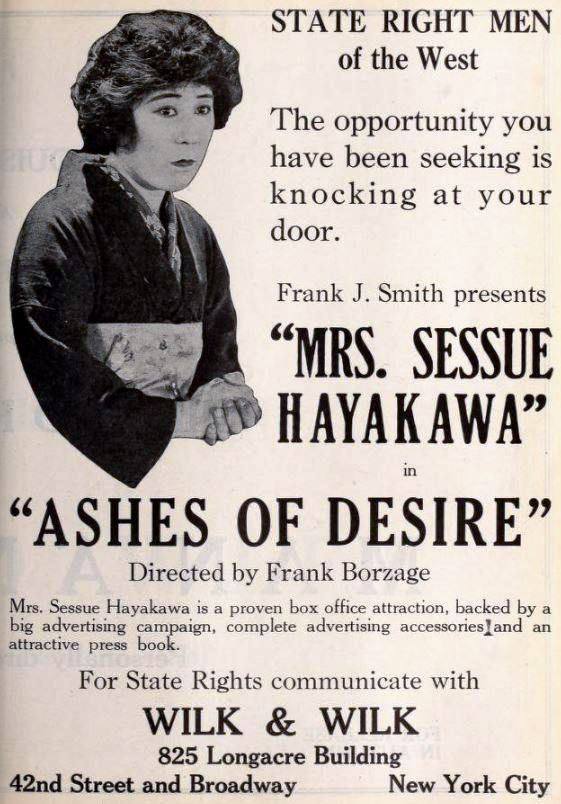
- 1920 advertisement for Ashes of Desire
- Directed by: Frank Borzage
- Written by: Sam Small Jr.
- Starring: Frank Borzage; Tsuru Aoki; Thomas Kurihara
- Production companies: Perfection Pictures; The Essanay Film Manufacturing Company
- Distributed by: George Kleine System
- Release date: March 1, 1918 (USA)
- Running time: 7 reels
- Country: United States
- Language: Silent (English intertitles)

The Curse of Iku is a 1918 American drama film directed by Frank Borzage and featuring Borzage, Tsuru Aoki, and Thomas Kurihara in lead dual roles.

== Plot ==
As described in a film magazine, Carroll (Borzage), an American sailor, is shipwrecked on the coast of Japan, and is befriended by a Japanese prince. As Americans are banned from the country, he is sentenced to being tortured but Iku, his prosecutor, is killed. Iku dies cursing Carroll, who escapes with Iku's sister, Omi San (Aoki). Fifty years later Iku the third is sent to America to learn its customs. He falls in love with Virginia Stafford and, learning that she is the fiancé of Allan Carroll III (Borzage) and remembering his ancestor's band of hate, he kidnaps Virginia, takes her to Japan and marries her according to Japanese custom. Carroll comes to Japan and locates Virginia. A terrible struggle ensues in which Iku meets his death and Virginia is rescued. With the death of Iku, the curse is lifted.

== Cast ==
- Frank Borzage as Allan Carroll / Allan Carroll III
- Tsuru Aoki as Omi San
- Thomas Kurihara (credited as Thomas Kurihara)

== Production ==
In 1919 the film was reedited down to six reels with new intertitles, which changed the location of the action to the Malaysian coast, and released under state's rights basis with the title Ashes of Desire.

== Reception ==
Like many American films of the time, The Curse of Iku was subject to cuts by city and state film censorship boards. For example, the Chicago Board of Censors required cuts, in Reel 1, of the Japanese man murdering foreigner and wiping bloody sword, Reel 3, four closeup torture scenes showing young woman and flash four others, four scenes of crucifixion, Reel 4, all scenes of white woman in Japanese man's room, all scenes of Japanese man looking through keyhole into young woman's room and reflection in his eye, Reel 5, two scenes of Japanese man pouring chloroform on handkerchief, three scenes of slugging woman's father, attack on young woman in automobile and chloroforming her, scene of man being dragged from river, Reel 6, Japanese woman with hypodermic needle in hand, the intertitle "Iku gives you choice; will you be his dutiful wife or the plaything of the rabble?", two scenes of young American woman fighting with Japanese man, closeup of "woman tamer" leering through barred doors, Reel 7, stabbing of Japanese woman, two closeups of fight where daggers are used, and closeup of Japanese man with blood flowing from mouth.

== Preservation ==
With no prints of The Curse of Iku located in any film archives, it is considered a lost film.
