= The Boss of the Rancho =

1919 silent Western film directed by E. A. Middleton

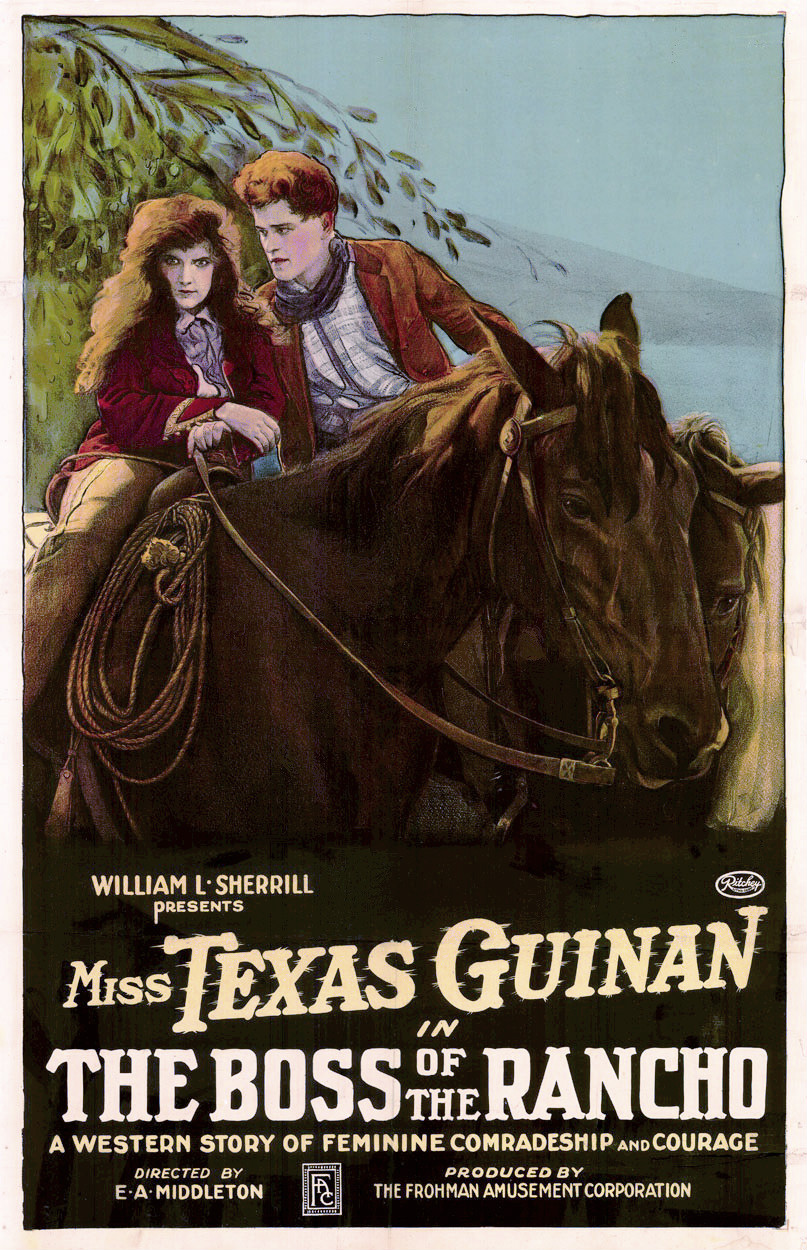
- lobby poster
- Directed by: E. A. Middleton
- Produced by: Frohman Amusement Corporation; William L. Sherrill
- Starring: Texas Guinan
- Release date: 1919
- Running time: 2 reels
- Country: United States
- Languages: Silent; English intertitles

The Boss of the Rancho is a 1919 American silent Western film starring Texas Guinan.

This Guinan short survives at George Eastman House.

== Cast ==
- Texas Guinan
