= Texas Guinan =

American actress and Prohibition era saloon keeper and entrepreneur (1884–1933)

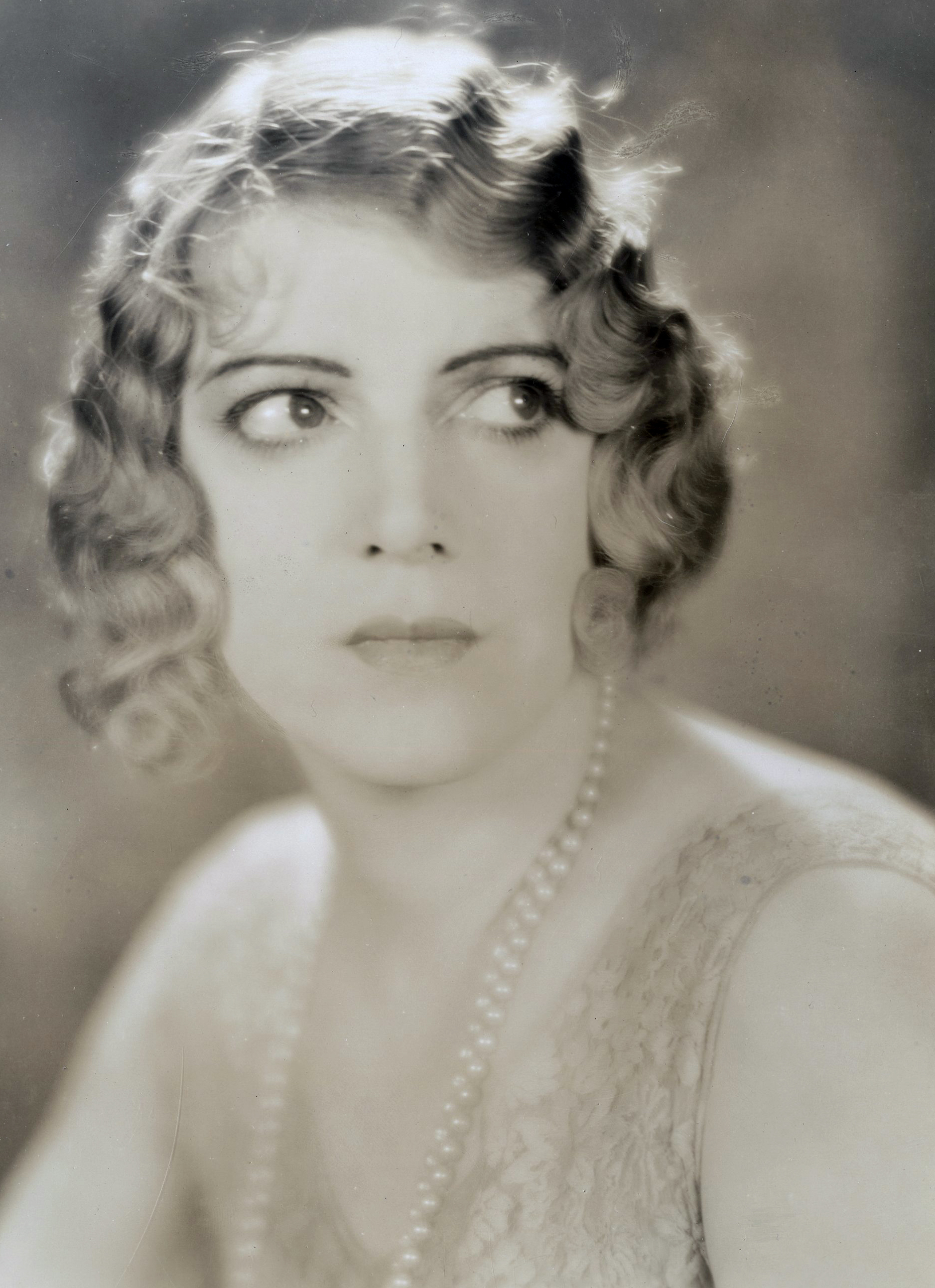
- Guinan, c. 1920
- Born: Mary Louise Cecilia Guinan; January 12, 1884; Waco, Texas, U.S.
- Died: November 5, 1933 (aged 49); Vancouver, British Columbia, Canada
- Resting place: Calvary Cemetery, Queens
- Occupations: Actress, producer, entrepreneur
- Years active: 1906–1933
- Spouse: John J. Moynahan (m. 1904; div. 1906)

Mary Louise Cecilia "Texas" Guinan (January 12, 1884 – November 5, 1933) was an American actress, producer, and entrepreneur. Born in Texas to Canadian immigrant parents, Guinan decided at an early age to become an entertainer. After becoming a star on the New York stage, the repercussions of her involvement in a weight loss scam motivated her to switch careers to the film business. Spending several years in California appearing in numerous productions, she eventually formed her own company.

She is most remembered for the speakeasy clubs she managed during Prohibition. Her clubs catered to the rich and famous, as well as to aspiring talent. After being arrested and indicted during a law enforcement sweep of speakeasy clubs, she was acquitted when her case went to trial.

== Personal life and early career ==
Guinan was one of four siblings born in Waco, Texas, to Irish-Canadians Michael (1855–1935) and Bessie (née Duffy) Guinan (1863–1939), who had emigrated separately as adults, meeting and marrying in Colorado, where they initially operated a wholesale grocery business. (Note: Sources conflict as to point of origin. Some say both parents immigrated from Dublin, Ireland. According to the 1900 US census, both were born in Canada.) Moving to Texas, they ran a horse and cattle ranch.

As a child, Guinan was nicknamed "Mamie" and attended convent school at the Loretta Convent in Waco, Texas. Growing up on a ranch provided her with basic cowboy skills, and she honed her marksmanship at a local shooting gallery. In 1898, her parents successfully secured her a two-year scholarship to the American Conservatory of Music offered by Chicago businessman Marshall Field. After developing her soprano vocal talents and finishing her studies, she joined a touring actors' troupe that featured American "Wild West" entertainment.

By 1904 using the name Marie Guinan, she married newspaper cartoonist John Moynahan on December 2. Two years later, Moynahan took a job in Boston. The couple eventually divorced, and Guinan moved to New York to pursue a career as a singer in the entertainment business. For years, she claimed she had been born with the name Texas, and never let facts stand in the way of her narrative: in a full-page 1910 interview in The San Francisco Call, for example, she falsely stated that her father "was the first white child seen in Waco" (he had in fact been a married adult when he arrived, and white settlers led by Jacob De Cordova had lived in Waco from the early or mid-19th century).

Theatre critic and Photoplay editor Julian Johnson, her companion for a decade, was influential in the creation of her public persona. Many erroneously believed them to be married. Her 1933 obituaries mention Johnson as her second husband, and millionaire George E. Townley as a third husband. Lacking any verification that the latter two marriages took place, Moynahan is now believed to have been her only husband.

Johnson's connection is thought to have led to a poem carrying her byline being printed in Photoplay. An alleged connection to the U.S. Senator from Texas, Joseph Weldon Bailey, evolved over time from a nonspecific tie to her family, to Guinan's being the senator's niece. The niece relationship seems implausible, since her parents were born and raised in a different country than either Senator Bailey or his wife. Mentions of him coincide with the timeline of her association with Julian Johnson. While he was editor at Photoplay, an article written by then-staff journalist Adela Rogers St. Johns remarked that Guinan "bore a distinct resemblance to her uncle, Senator Joe Bailey of Texas."

== Vaudeville and stage productions ==
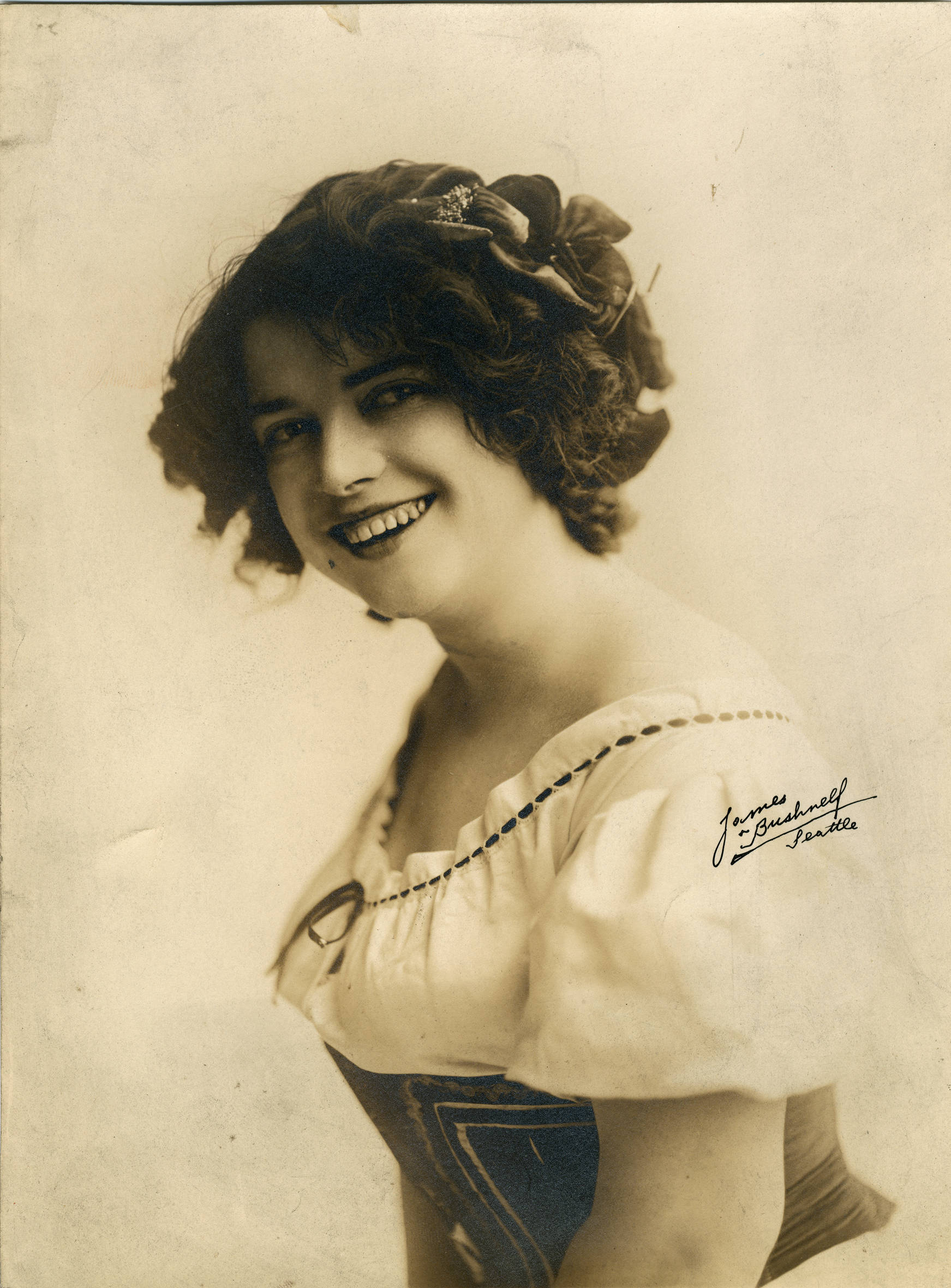
Guinan in 1911

Initially finding work as a chorus girl, she adopted the stage name Texas Guinan to give herself an edge in the competitive marketplaces of vaudeville and New York theatre productions. Within a year, she had the female lead in a stage production of Simple Simon Simple, during which she accidentally shot herself on stage with a loaded gun. In 1908, she received favorable notices for her performance in The Gibson Girl Review. That same year, she placed an advertisement in newspapers offering $1,000 to any songwriter who provided her with a song of equal popularity to the Gus Edwards–penned "That's What the Rose Said to Me" She appeared as a soprano vocalist in many productions, including The Gay Musician, The Hoyden and The Lone Star.

She had achieved a degree of national stardom by 1910. John P. Slocum managed her when she appeared in his multiyear touring production of The Kissing Girl. When Ned Wayburn rolled out his production of The Passing Show on a national tour in 1913, Guinan was one of the headliners. Coinciding with the publicity for the tour, Guinan licensed her name and image to be used by W. C. Cunningham for a weight-loss plan. The advertisements that appeared in media across the country claimed Guinan had lost 70 pounds on the plan. Investigative journalism by the Chicago Tribune alleged that Guinan knowingly acted as a shill in perpetrating a fraud upon the public. A subsequent investigation by the postal service revealed it to be a swindle. United States Postmaster General Albert S. Burleson quickly acted to prohibit Guinan from receiving mail through the postal service. Although she continued on the stage, the incident damaged her career, and was a motivating factor in expanding her repertoire by trying her hand in the California film business.

Guinan appeared as Zaza in the variety show Hop-o'-My-Thumb, based on a French fairytale of the same name. The show opened at the Manhattan Opera House November 26, 1913, and closed January 1, 1914. She toured the United States with the Whirl of the World musical comedy in 1915. The tour coincided with her unverified account of being casually approached in Berlin by Kaiser Wilhelm II, who engaged her in conversation as she sat alone reading a book.

She appeared in the musical Gay Paree that opened at the Shubert Theatre on August 18, 1925, and closed on January 30, 1926. Guinan was part of the cast of the musical Padlocks of 1927, also at the Shubert.

== Films ==
In a film career that began in 1917 and continued through 1933, she was part of the vanguard of women filmmakers in the United States. Her later claims of being in France in 1917 entertaining the troops, and being decorated with a bronze medal by French field marshal Joseph Joffre, have been proven false by the timeline and California location of her prolific film-making. Triangle Film Corporation, founded in 1915 by Harry Aitken and Roy Aitken, featured Guinan in four two-reel shorts between 1917 and 1918, The Fuel of Life, The Stainless Barrier, The Gun Woman and The Love Brokers. Unlike the musical genre she was known for on stage, she was now moving towards the Western movie genre, and on her dressing room door appeared a map of the state of Texas, rather than her name. Triangle began billing her as "the female Bill Hart" in reference to the industry's first Western star who at that time topped fandom popularity polls.

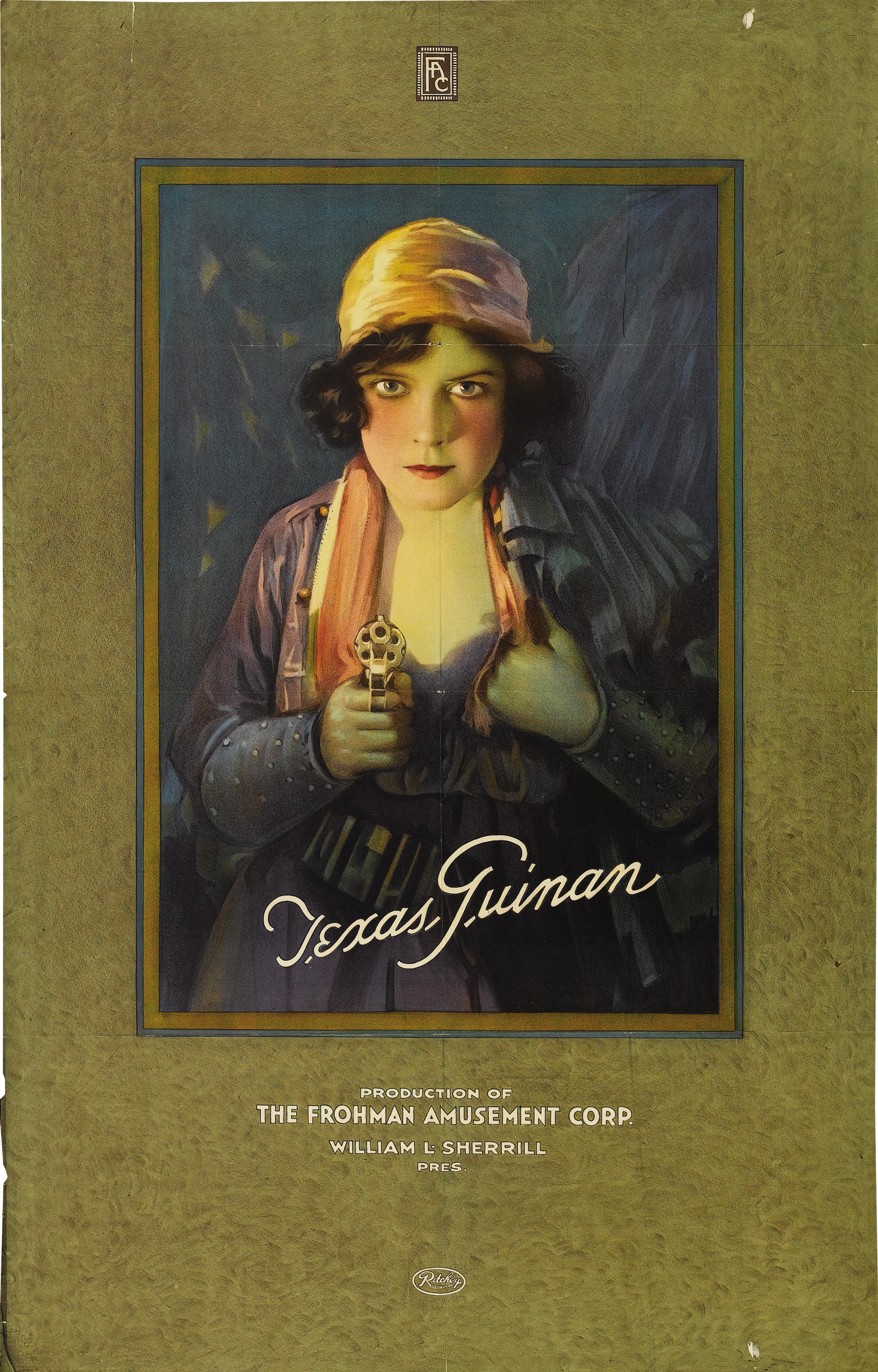
Advertisement for Frohman Amusement Corp featuring Texas Guinan

Frohman Brothers were Broadway producers. In 1915, brother Daniel Frohman and partner William L. Sherrill formed the Frohman Amusement Corporation, a motion picture business. They made more than a dozen films with Guinan in 1918, including The Boss of the Rancho and The Heart of Texas.

During her years with Bull's Eye Productions/Reelcraft, she began to expand towards the production end of film-making, as a unit department head on the films Outwitted, The Lady of the Law, The Girl of the Rancho, The Desert Vulture, and at least five other productions. She created Texas Guinan Productions in 1921 to produce Code of the West, Spitfire and Texas of the Mounted. After I Am the Woman and The Stampede for Victor Kremer Film Features, she returned to New York.

Guinan was again seen on the screen with two sound pictures, playing slightly fictionalized versions of herself as a speakeasy proprietress in Queen of the Night Clubs (1929) and then Broadway Thru a Keyhole (1933, written by Walter Winchell) shortly before her death.

=== My Lady Robin Hood ===
My Lady Robin Hood is a 1919 American silent Western film directed by Jay Hunt and starring Guinan.

== Queen of the night clubs ==
The 1920 Eighteenth Amendment to the United States Constitution put Prohibition into effect, making sales or transport of alcoholic beverages illegal. While it ruined legitimate businesses, people continued drinking alcohol. Those who transported and sold it were known as "bootleggers". Thus began the establishment of the speakeasy private clubs, a cultural phenomenon in which Guinan excelled. Her introduction into the business was when speakeasy partners Emil Gervasini and John Levi of the Beaux Arts club hired Guinan in 1923 as a singer, for which she was paid $50,000.

I never take a drink and I never sell a drink. I am paid to put on an act and I put on an act. I once gave [U.S. Attorney General] Buckner a certified check for $100,000 to give anyone who has ever seen me take a drink or sell a drink. That check is still good, so's my offer.

— Texas Guinan, December 1927

Guinan's give-and-take dialogue with the customers inspired producer Nils Granlund to put together a full floor show with Guinan presiding as emcee for Ziegfeld Follies chorus girls. Bootleg huckster Larry Fay struck a deal with them to feature the show at his El Fey Club on West 47th Street in Manhattan. There, she became known for her catchphrase, "Hello, Sucker! Come on in and leave your wallet on the bar." In return for being the draw to attract wealthy and powerful clientele, Guinan received 50% of the profits. While working as dancers at the club, Ruby Keeler, Barbara Stanwyck, and George Raft were discovered by talent scouts.

Guinan and Fay were frequently shut down by the police, yet reopened soon after in new locations with new fixtures, and new names. Later, she opened the Texas Guinan Club at 117 West 48th Street, also closed by the police. She and Fay later opened the Del-Fey Club in Miami the same year. By her own account, they once took in $700,000 in less than a year.

When Guinan returned to New York in January 1926, as hostess of the 300 Club at 151 W. 54th Street, the opening night's event was the marriage ceremony for actress Wilda Bennett and Argentine dancer Abraham "Peppy" de Albrew. Other celebrities who visited her club were Al Jolson, Scottish operatic soprano Mary Garden, Jack Dempsey, American operatic soprano Geraldine Farrar, and the Prince of Wales.

In July 1926, the 300 Club was raided by the police, who seized bottles of liquor and arrested two people for "violation of the section of the penal code forbidding suggestive dances". The last week of June 1928, Assistant U.S. Attorney General Mabel Walker Willebrandt ordered a raid of speakeasy clubs in New York. Guinan, Helen Morgan (hostess of Chez Helen Morgan), Nils Granlund, and 104 others were arrested, and indicted by a federal grand jury. Guinan, Morgan and Granlund faced two years in prison, with a $10,000 maximum fine, if convicted. The others indicted were employees and patrons, who faced lesser penalties. At her April 1929 trial, Guinan was acquitted.

== Final years and death ==
During the Great Depression, she took her show on the road. She attempted to move to Europe, but Scotland Yard threatened to board her ship if she tried to land in England, where she was on their list of "barred aliens". The show was banned from France under labor technicalities. Guinan had a contract with a Paris club, but French employment laws dissuaded non-citizens from working in France. She turned this to her advantage by launching the satirical revue Too Hot for Paris upon her return to NY, in 1933.

Guinan played Green Mill Cocktail Lounge in Chicago, Illinois. Part of her act included audience participation with small give-away slapsticks.

While on the road with Too Hot for Paris, she contracted amoebic dysentery in Chicago, Illinois, during the epidemic outbreak at the Congress Hotel during the run of the Chicago World's Fair. The epidemic was traced to tainted water. She fell ill in Vancouver, British Columbia, and died there on November 5, 1933, age 49, exactly one month before Prohibition was repealed; 7,500 people attended her funeral. Bandleader Paul Whiteman was a pallbearer along with two of her former lawyers and writer Heywood Broun.

Guinan is interred at the Calvary Cemetery in Queens, New York. Her family donated a tabernacle in her name to St. Patrick's Church in Vancouver in recognition of Father Louis Forget's attentions during her last hours. When the original church was demolished in 2004, the tabernacle was preserved for the new church built on the site. She was survived by both of her parents. Her father was 81 years old at his death on May 14, 1935, and her mother died at age 101 in 1959. The newspaper obituary listed his place of birth as Sherbrooke, Quebec, Canada, and his profession as a wholesale grocer.

== Legacy ==
Actress portrayals of Guinan

- 1927 – Broadway Nights, De Sacia Mooers
- 1945 – Incendiary Blonde, Betty Hutton.
- 1961 – The George Raft Story, Barbara Nichols.
- 1961 – Splendor in the Grass, Phyllis Diller.

Fictional characters based on Guinan

- 1920s – Miss Missouri Martin, Damon Runyon's short stories about Broadway
- 1932 – Maudie Triplett played by Mae West, Night After Night
- 1939 – Panama Smith played by Gladys George, The Roaring Twenties
- 1960 – Sally Kansas played by June Havoc, episode The Larry Fay Story, The Untouchables
- 1984 – Vera played by Diane Lane, The Cotton Club
- Velma Kelly, the musical Chicago; personality modeled on Guinan and backstory based on murder suspect Belva Gaertner
- Guinan, fictional bartender, played by Whoopi Goldberg, in the Star Trek universe having been introduced in Star Trek: The Next Generation. According to Whoopi Goldberg, Gene Roddenberry told her that he named the character of Guinan after Texas Guinan.

Miscellaneous

- 2007 – Black Hats, as a character in the novel

== Gallery ==
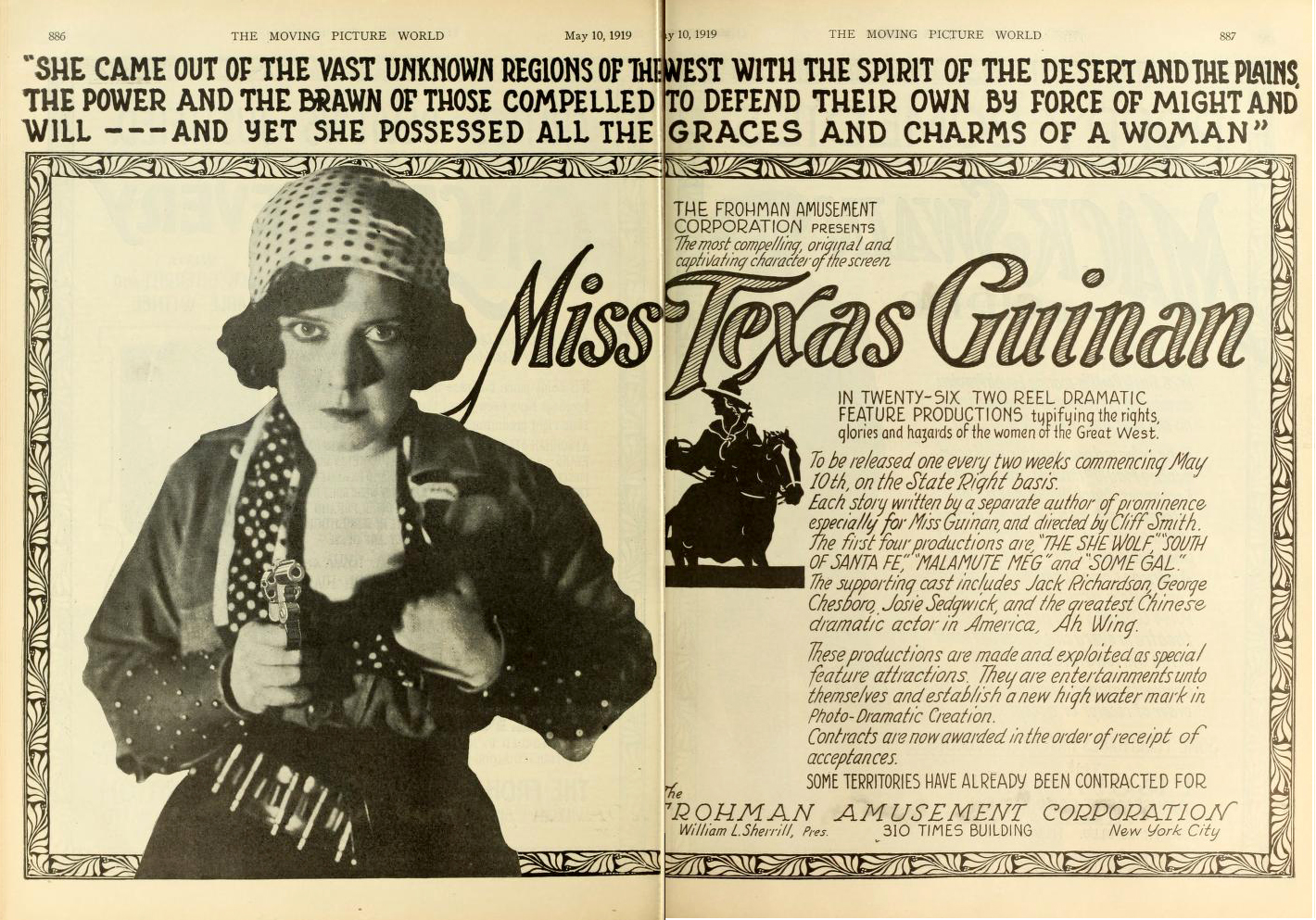

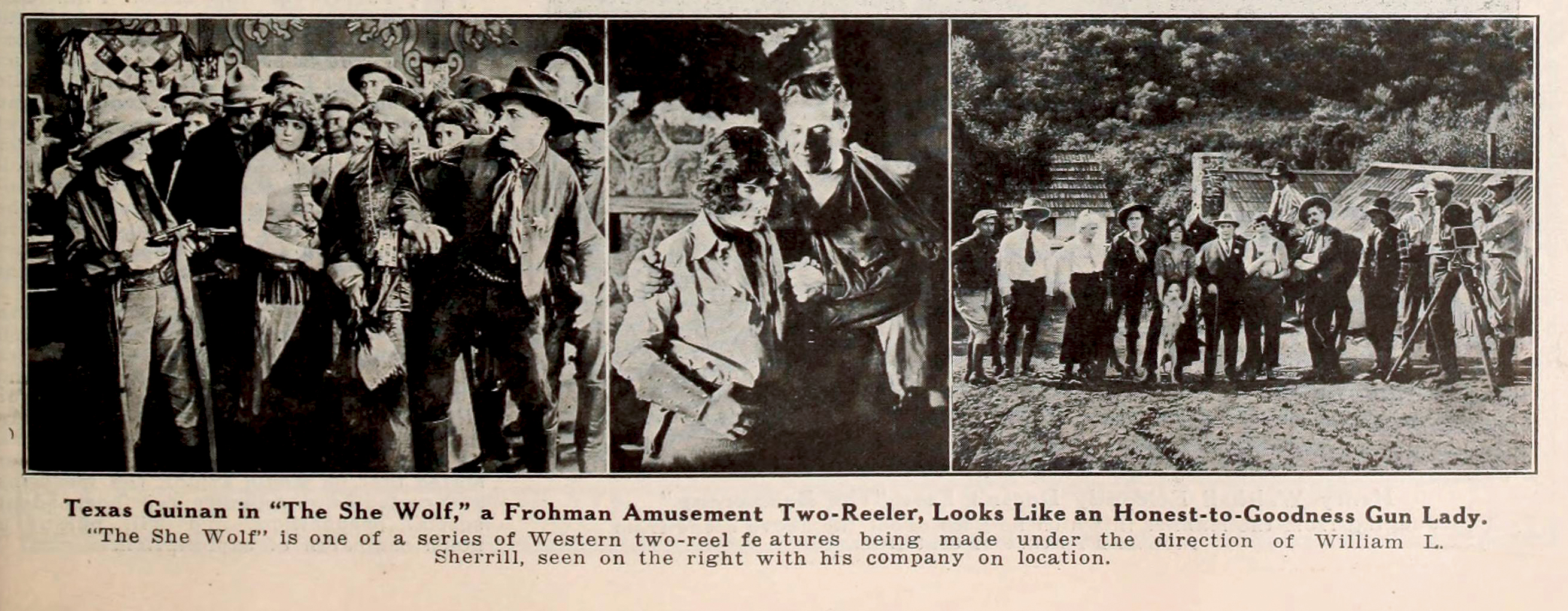

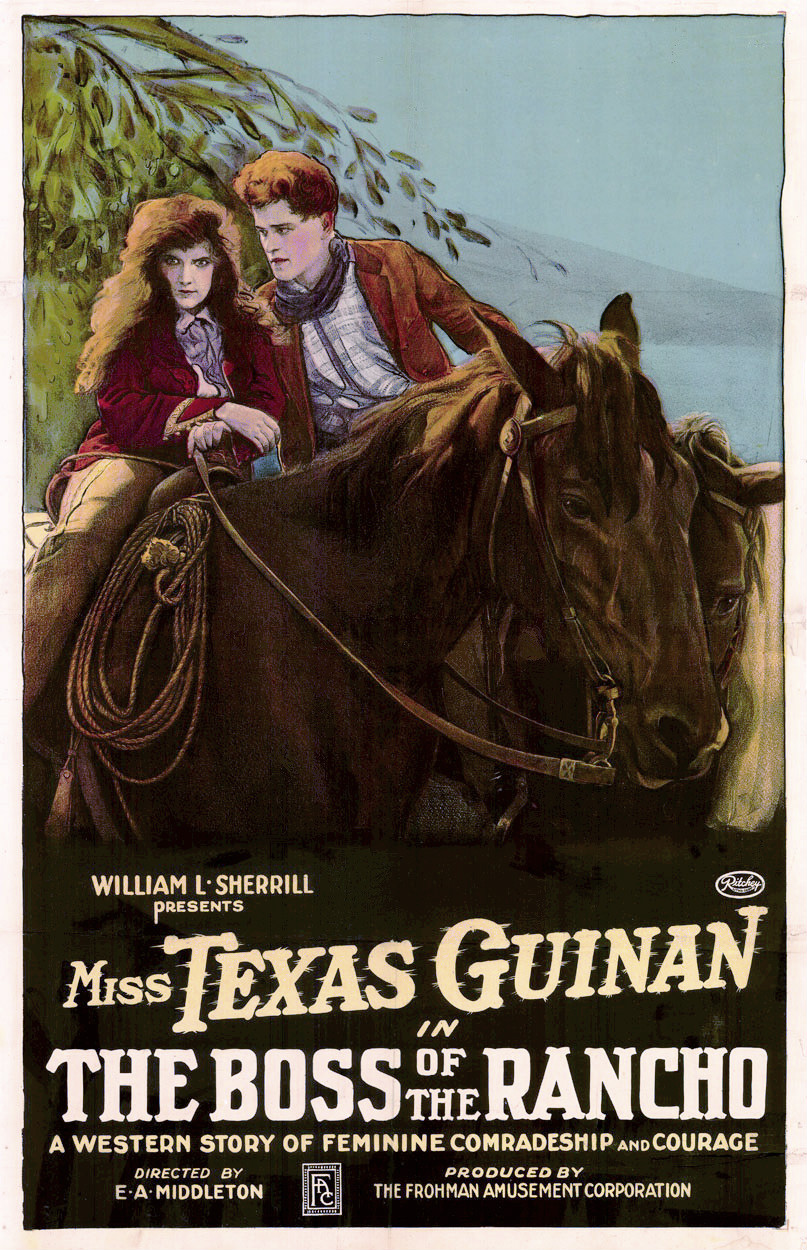

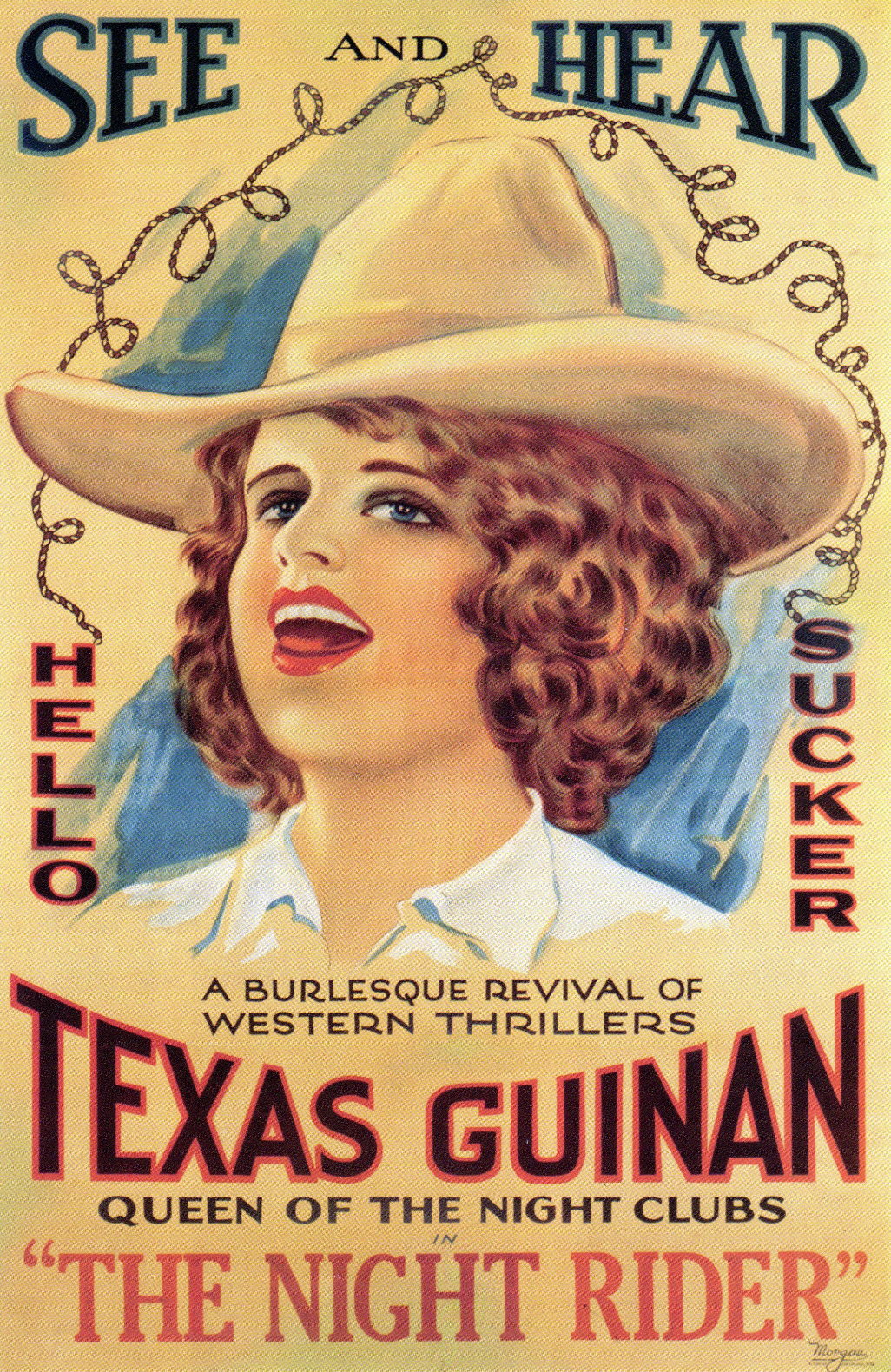

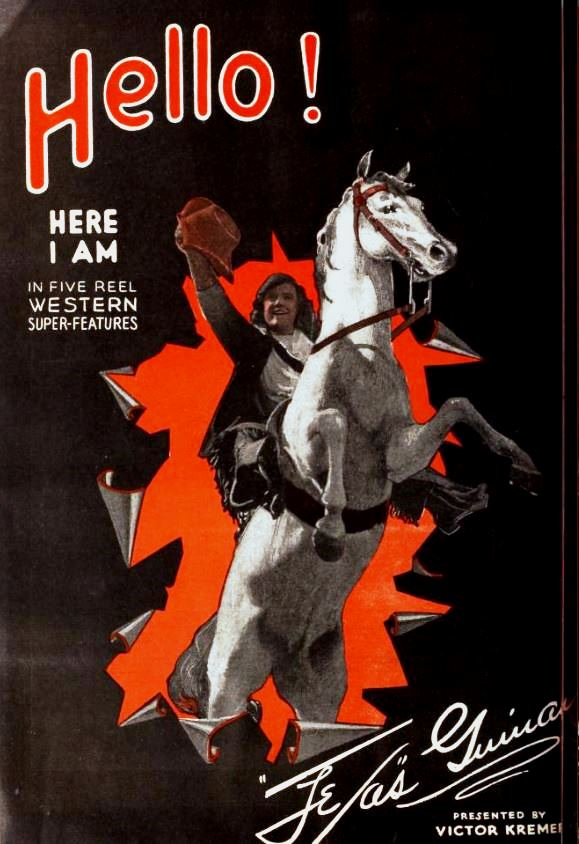

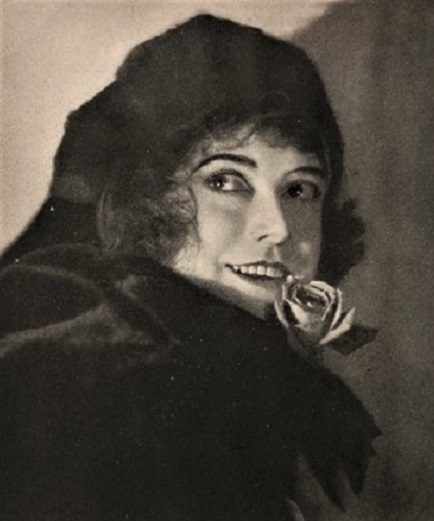

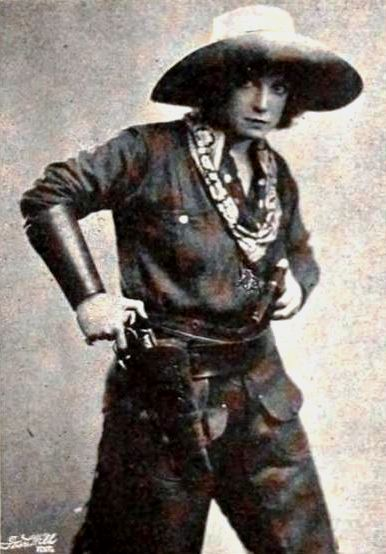

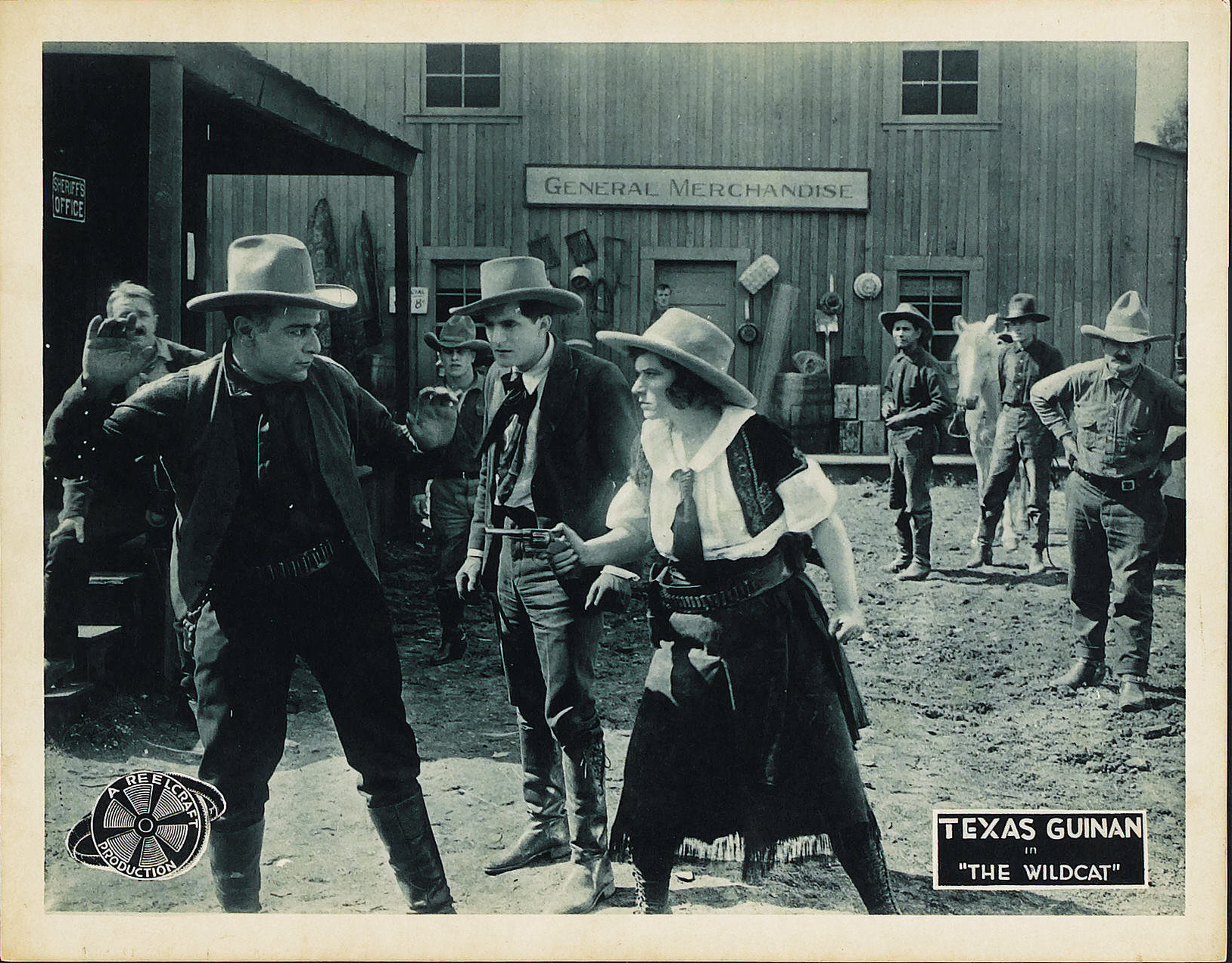

== Filmography ==
Acting credits of Texas Guinan
Year	Title	Production	Notes	Ref(s)
1917	The Fuel of Life	Triangle Film Corporation		
1917	The Stainless Barrier	Triangle Film Corporation		
1918	The Gun Woman	Triangle Film Corporation		
1918	The Love Brokers	Triangle Film Corporation		
1918	Getaway Kate	Astra Films		
1918	The Hell Cat	Goldwyn Pictures	Lost film	
1919	The Boss of the Rancho	Frohman Amusement Corp.		
1919	The Call of Bob White	Frohman Amusement Corp.		
1919	The Dangerous Little Devil	Frohman Amusement Corp.		
1919	The Dead Man's Hand	Frohman Amusement Corp.		
1919	The Girl of Hell's Agony	Frohman Amusement Corp.		
1919	The Heart of Texas	Frohman Amusement Corp.		
1919	Just Bill	Frohman Amusement Corp.		
1919	Little Miss Deputy	Frohman Amusement Corp.		
1919	Malamute Meg	Frohman Amusement Corp.		
1919	The Sacrifice	Frohman Amusement Corp.		
1919	The She Wolf	Frohman Amusement Corp.		
1919	Some Gal	Frohman Amusement Corp.		
1919	South of Santa Fe	Frohman Amusement Corp.		
1919	The Spirit of Cabin Mine	Frohman Amusement Corp.		
1919	Letters of Fire	Melody Productions		
1919	The Love Defender	World Film Company		
1919	Texas Guinan and Jack Hane			
1919	My Lady Robin Hood	Bull's Eye Productions/Reelcraft		
1919	Outwitted	Bull's Eye Productions/Reelcraft	also unit department head	
1919	The Lady of the Law	Bull's Eye Productions/Reelcraft	also unit department head	
1919	The Girl of the Rancho	Bull's Eye Productions/Reelcraft	also unit department head	
1919	The Desert Vulture	Bull's Eye Productions/Reelcraft	also unit department head	
1919	Fighting the Vigilantes	Bull's Eye Productions/Reelcraft	also unit department head	
1920	The Moonshine Feud	Bull's Eye Productions/Reelcraft	also unit department head	
1920	The Night Rider	Bull's Eye Productions/Reelcraft	also unit department head	
1920	Not Guilty	Bull's Eye Productions/Reelcraft	also unit department head	
1920	The White Squaw	Bull's Eye Productions/Reelcraft	also unit department head	
1920	The Wildcat	Bull's Eye Productions/Reelcraft		
1921	Code of the West	Texas Guinan Productions		
1921	Spitfire	Texas Guinan Productions		
1921	Texas of the Mounted	Texas Guinan Productions		
1921	I Am the Woman	Victor Kremer Film Features		
1921	The Stampede	Victor Kremer Film Features		
1924	Night Life of New York	Famous Players–Lasky	Lost film	
1929	Queen of the Night Clubs	Warner Bros.	Lost film	
1929	Glorifying the American Girl	Paramount Famous Lasky Corp.	Uncredited as herself	
1933	Broadway Through a Keyhole	Twentieth Century Pictures	Written by Walter Winchell	

== Written by Texas Guinan ==
- "How to Keep Your Husband Out of My Night Club", Liberty magazine, No 18, April 30, 1932, pp. 50–51
- "Oh, Professor!", College Humor, June 1932, p. 24.

== Sources ==
- Collins, Max Allan (2018). Black Hats: A Novel of Wyatt Earp & Al Capone. Brash Books, LLC. ISBN 978-1941298923.
- Cullen, Frank; Hackman, Florence; McNeilly, Donald (2007). Vaudeville Old & New: An Encyclopedia of variety performances in America. Psychology Press. ISBN 978-0-415-93853-2.
- Erickson, Hal (2017). Any Resemblance to Actual Persons: The Real People Behind 400+ Fictional Movie Characters. McFarland. ISBN 978-1-4766-2930-8.
- Hoefling, Larry J. (2010). Nils Thor Granlund: Show Business Entrepreneur and America's First Radio Star. McFarland. ISBN 978-0-7864-5599-7. OCLC 903290442.
- Nachman, Gerald (2016). Showstoppers!: The Surprising Backstage Stories of Broadway's Most Remarkable Songs. Chicago Review Press. ISBN 978-1613731055.
- Shirley, Glenn (1989). Hello, Sucker! : The Story of Texas Guinan (1st ed.). Austin, TX: Eakin Press. ISBN 0-89015-690-5. OCLC 474889064.
- Sizer, Mona (2008). "Too Hot For Paris". Outrageous Texans: Tales of the Rich and Infamous. Lanham, Md.: Taylor Trade Pub. pp. 79–104. ISBN 978-1-58979-338-5. OCLC 182856979.
- Slide, Anthony (2012). The Encyclopedia of Vaudeville. Jackson: University Press of Mississippi. ISBN 978-1-61703-249-3. (Note: this is an ebook without page numbers)
- Slide, Anthony (2010). "James R. Quirk and Photoplay". Inside the Hollywood Fan Magazine: A History of Star Makers, Fabricators, and Gossip Mongers. University Press of Mississippi. ISBN 978-1-60473-414-0 – via ProjectMuse.(subscription required)
- Tucker, Kenneth (2011). Eliot Ness and the Untouchables: The Historical Reality and the Film and Television Depictions (2d ed.). McFarland. ISBN 978-0-7864-8877-3.
- Wallace, David (2012). Capital of the World: A Portrait of New York City in the Roaring Twenties. Rowman & Littlefield. ISBN 978-0762768196.
