= Paul Stahr =

American illustrator

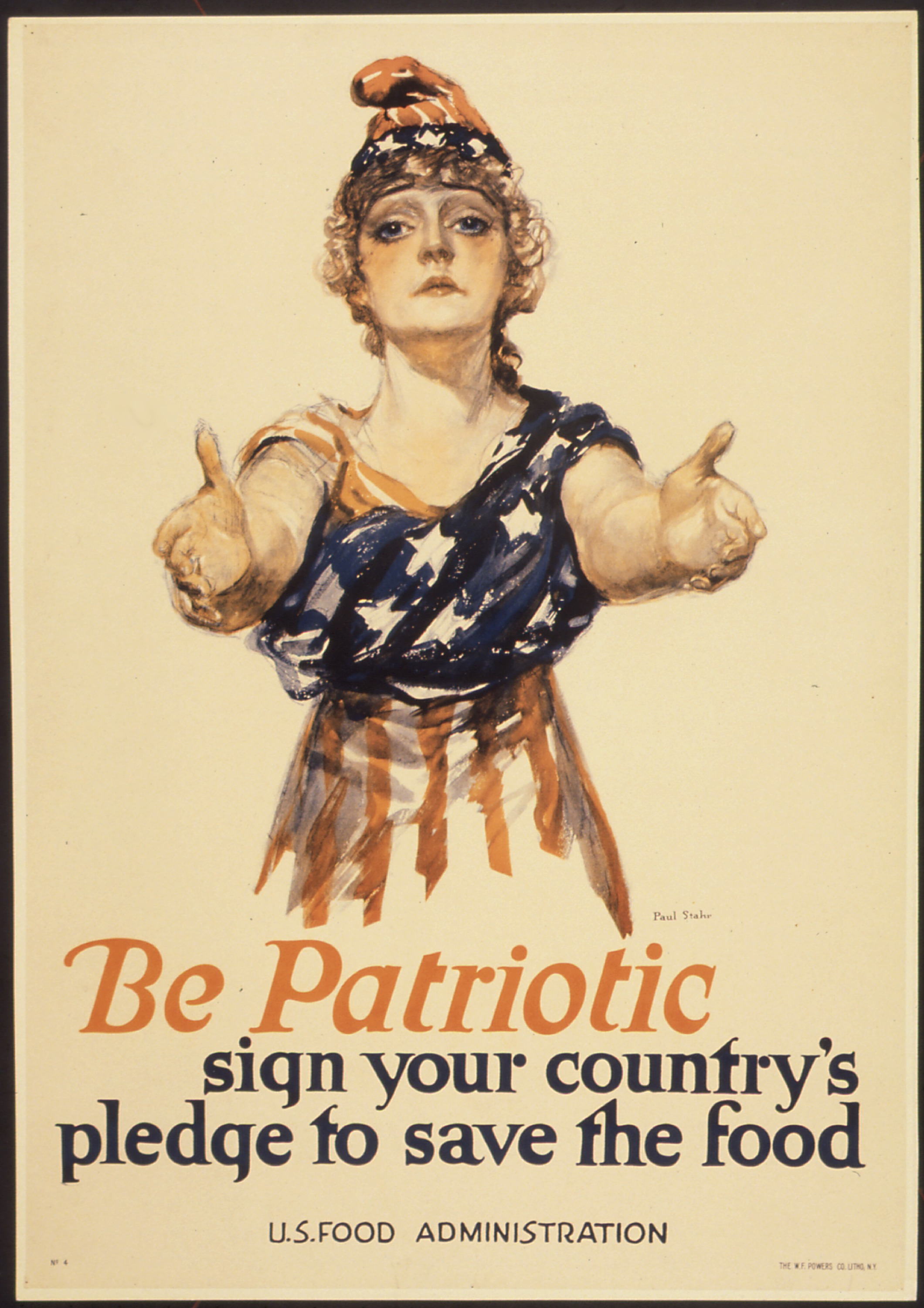
World War I Poster

Paul C. Stahr (1883–1953) was an American illustrator who created many posters, book and magazine covers, particularly for Pulps. Stahr illustrated numerous covers for Argosy magazine from 1923 to 1936.

Stahr was longtime resident of Long Beach, New York.
