= William L. Sherrill =

American film producer

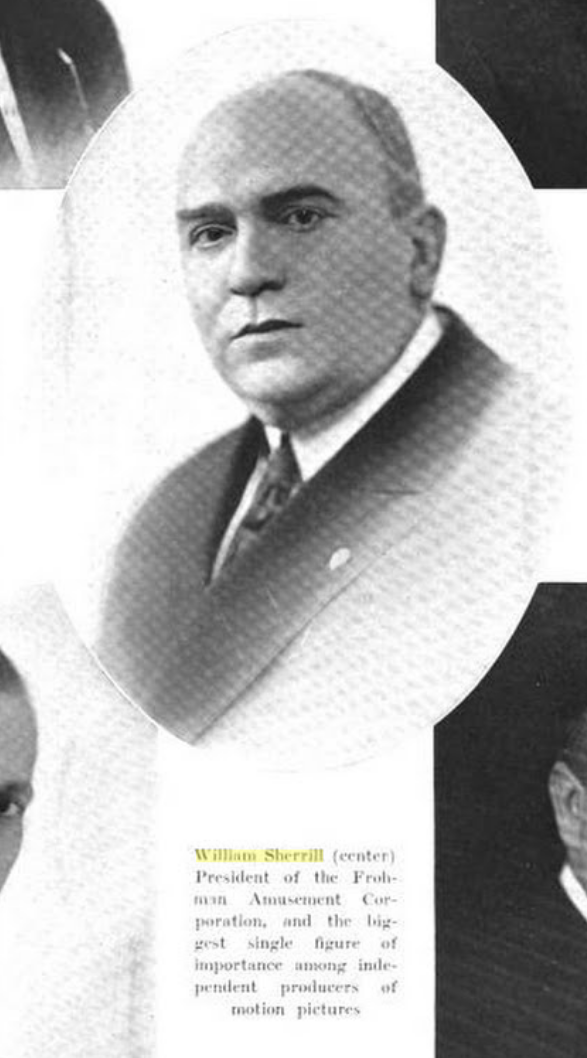

William L. Sherill was a producer in the early film industry of the United States. He served as president of the Frohman Amusement Company. A 1918 issue of Theatre Magazine reported he was the single most important figure among independent producers of motion pictures.

== Biography ==
Sherrill was president of the Frohman Amusement Corporation, formed in 1914 in Delaware and based in New York City, and several of its productions were advertised as being "presented" by him. He also became president of the Producers and Exhibitors Affiliated company.

Sherrill traveled to Frohman's studios in Tampa, Florida to check in on production of Birth of a Race.

The New York Times reported on a dispute involving allegations Mayor Mitchell used his position to influence coverage of an automobile accident in which Sherrill was one of those involved.

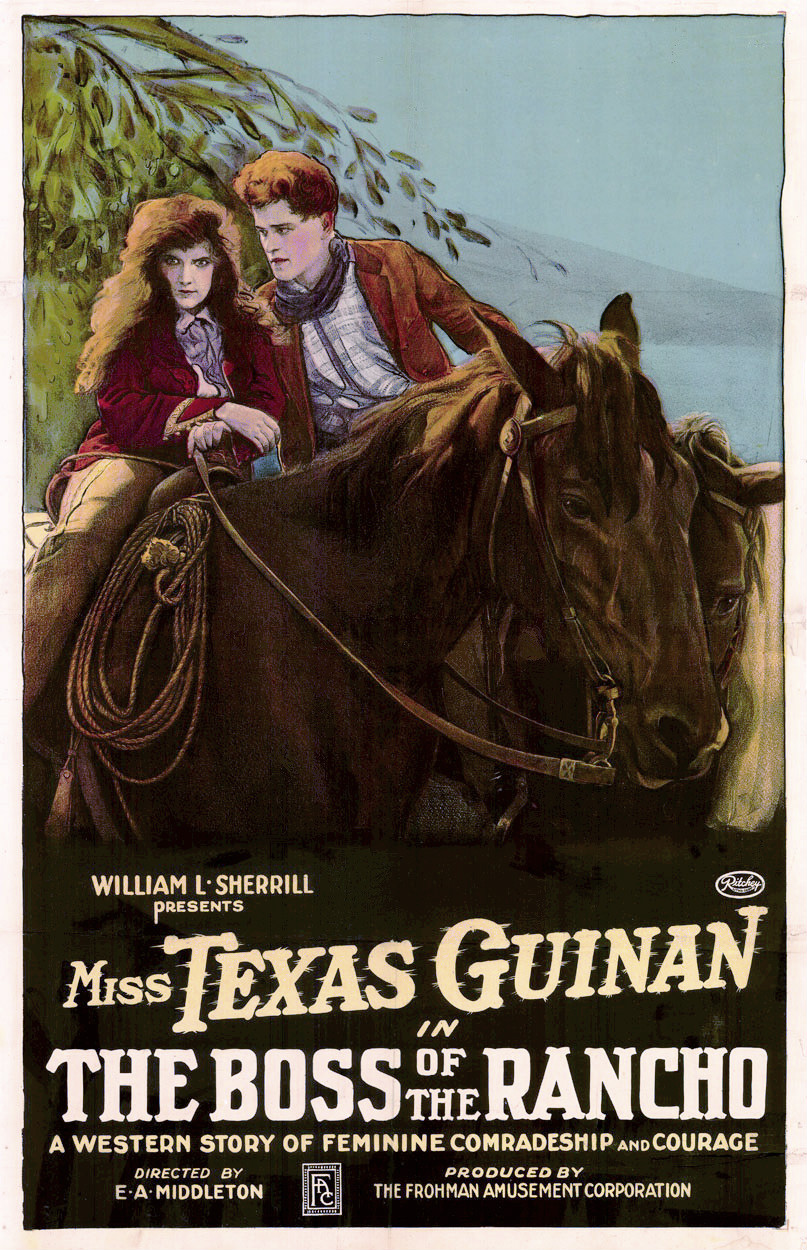
Poster advertisement noting "William L. Sherrill presents Miss Texas Guinan in The Boss of the Rancho"

In 1918 he presented a photoplay starring H. B. Warner in God's Man (1918 film). Texas Guinan was one of the stars featured in Sherrill's Frohman productions.

Sherrill was involved in film industry discussions about hiring extras directly rather than via agents. He was also at meetings of the National Association of the Motion Pictures Industry seeking to have presidential candidates address censorship issues. Sherrill volunteered to pay for an artificial limb for an individual at a Rotary Club meeting in Tampa.

His oldest son William L. Sherrill Jr. joined the U.S. Army in 1918. Film director (formerly a child actor with Frohman) Jack Sherrill and W. L. Sherrill Jr. were among those arrested in 1924 at Jr.'s Laurel Canyon home where a party with alcohol took place during the prohibition era.
