= A Pair of Sixes =

A Pair of Sixes may refer to:

- A Pair of Sixes (play), a 1914 farce by Edward Peple
- A Pair of Sixes (film), a 1918 American silent comedy film
