= The Martyrdom of Philip Strong =

1916 film by Richard Ridgely

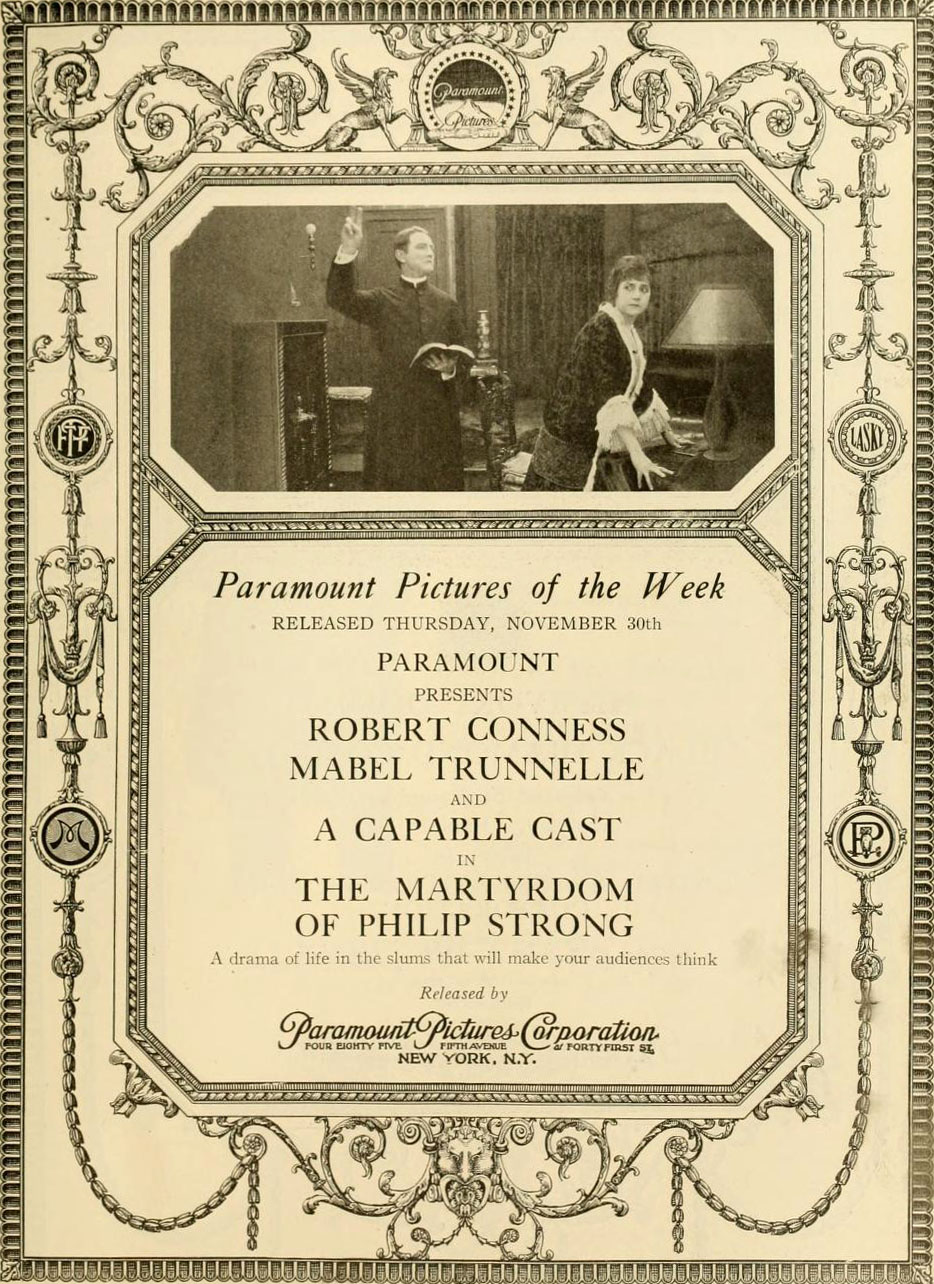
- Theatrical release poster
- Directed by: Richard Ridgely
- Screenplay by: Everett McNeil; Francis Neilson; Charles Sheldon
- Starring: Robert Conness; Mabel Trunnelle; Janet Dawley; Bigelow Cooper; Helen Strickland; Frank A. Lyons
- Cinematography: George W. Lane
- Production company: Edison Company
- Distributed by: Paramount Pictures
- Release date: November 30, 1916
- Running time: 50 minutes
- Country: United States
- Language: English

The Martyrdom of Philip Strong is a 1916 American drama silent film directed by Richard Ridgely and written by Everett McNeil, Francis Neilson and Charles Sheldon. The film stars Robert Conness, Mabel Trunnelle, Janet Dawley, Bigelow Cooper, Helen Strickland and Frank A. Lyons. The film was released on November 3, 1916, by Paramount Pictures.

== Cast ==
- Robert Conness as Philip Strong
- Mabel Trunnelle as Sarah Strong
- Janet Dawley as Irma Strong
- Bigelow Cooper as Brother Man
- Helen Strickland as Mrs. Alden
- Frank A. Lyons as William Winter
- William Wadsworth as Dunn
- Herbert Prior as Hikes
- Olive Wright as May Hikes
- Edith Wright as Loreen
- Brad Sutton as Hooks
