= Ranson's Folly =

Ranson's Folly may refer to:

- Ranson's Folly, a 1902 novel by Richard Harding Davis
- Ranson's Folly, a 1903 play by Richard Harding Davis, adapted from his novel.
- Ranson's Folly (1915 film), a lost 1915 silent film
- Ranson's Folly (1926 film), a 1926 silent film
