= Larry Evans (author) =

American novelist and playwright

Larry Edward Evans (died 1925) was an American novelist and playwright. Several of his stories were performed on stage and adapted for film. Some of his work was serialized in Metropolitan Magazine (New York City), where Teddy Roosevelt was an editor during World War I. Evans was listed along with other "Famous Contributors" in an ad for Metropolitan in Theatre Magazine in 1921.

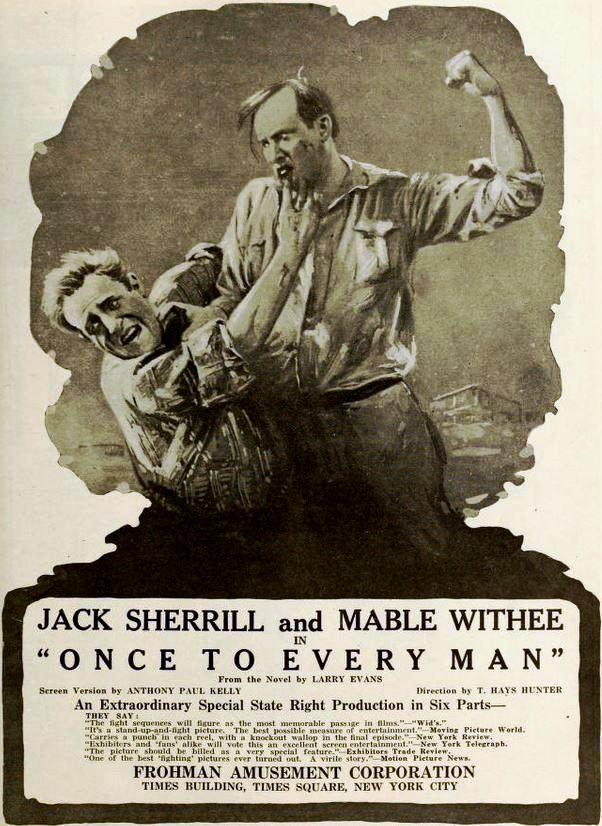
Advertisement for Once to Every Man film

Evans wrote the novels Then I'll Come Back to You and Once to Every Man. The latter was adapted to film as The Fighting Heart (1925 film).

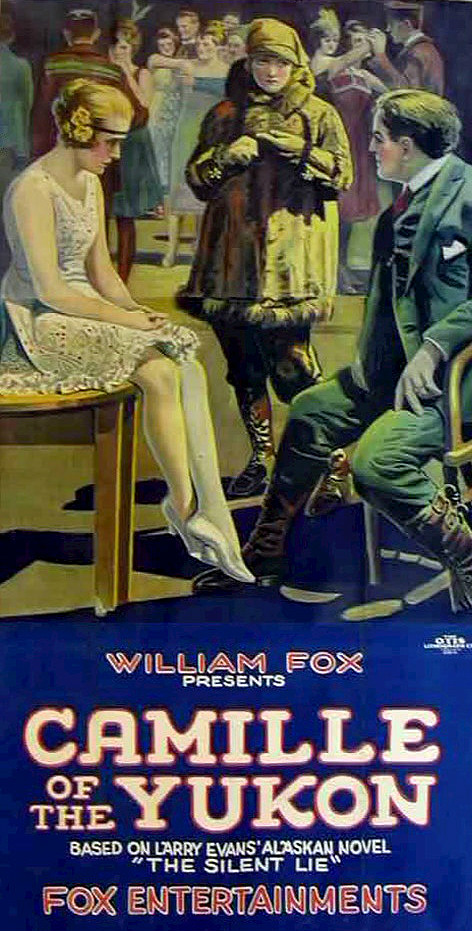
Poster for Camille of the Yukon

Several of his stories were also adapted to film. His story The Painted Lady was published in the Saturday Evening Post. It was adapted to film as When a Man Sees Red in 1917 and then as The Painted Lady (1925), and republished as in a photoplay edition illustrated with scenes from the movie by Grosset & Dunlap. It was made into film a third time as Pursued (1934 film). Evans story Conahan was adapted to film as The Silent Lie. The film was reissued several years later as Camille of the Yukon poster. The Federal Trade Commission examined the practice of redistributing films using new titles and advertising as if they were new.

Evans died of Tuberculosis in May 1925.

== Then I'll Come Back to You ==
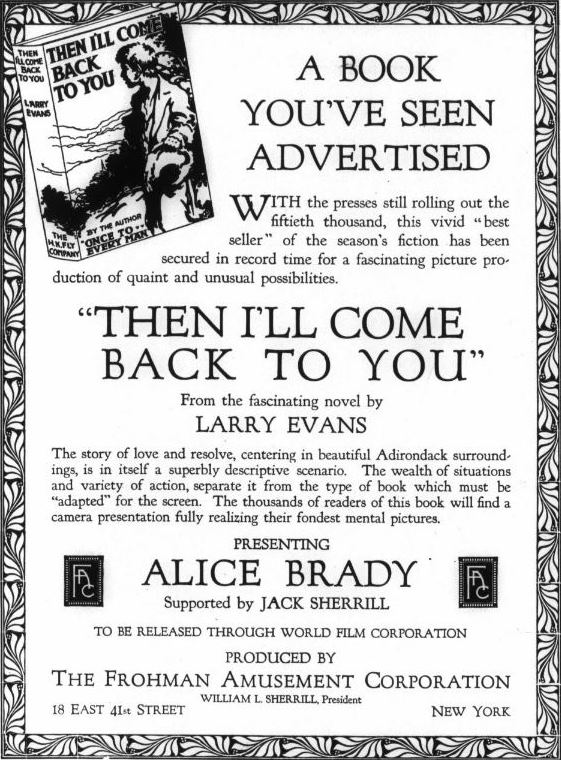
Advertisement for Frohman Amusement Corporation's silent film adaptation of Then I'll Come Back to You

Then I'll Come Back to You was a novel by Evans that was adapted into a Frohman Amusement Corporation film in 1916 starring Alice Brady with actor Jack Sherrill in a supporting role.

According to an advertisement for the film it is a love story set in the Adirondacks. The book was published by H. K. Fly.

George Irving directed the film version.

According to IMDb, the film was made in Asheville, North Carolina and Black Mountain, North Carolina. The site credits Frances Marion with the script.

== Some One in the House ==
Evans wrote the play Some One in the House. It was adapted for the film Someone in the House in 1919.

== Filmography ==
- Then I'll Come Back to You (1916)

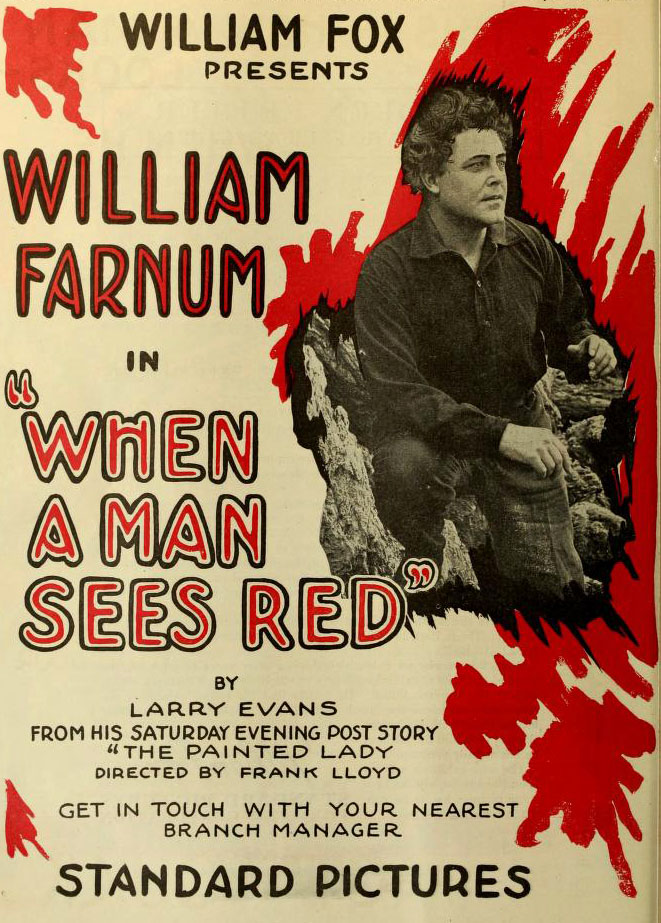
Advertisement for When a Man Sees Red, a 1917 film based on Evans story The Painted Lady

- The Painted Lady, a story published in the Saturday Evening Post was adapted to film as When a Man Sees Red in 1917

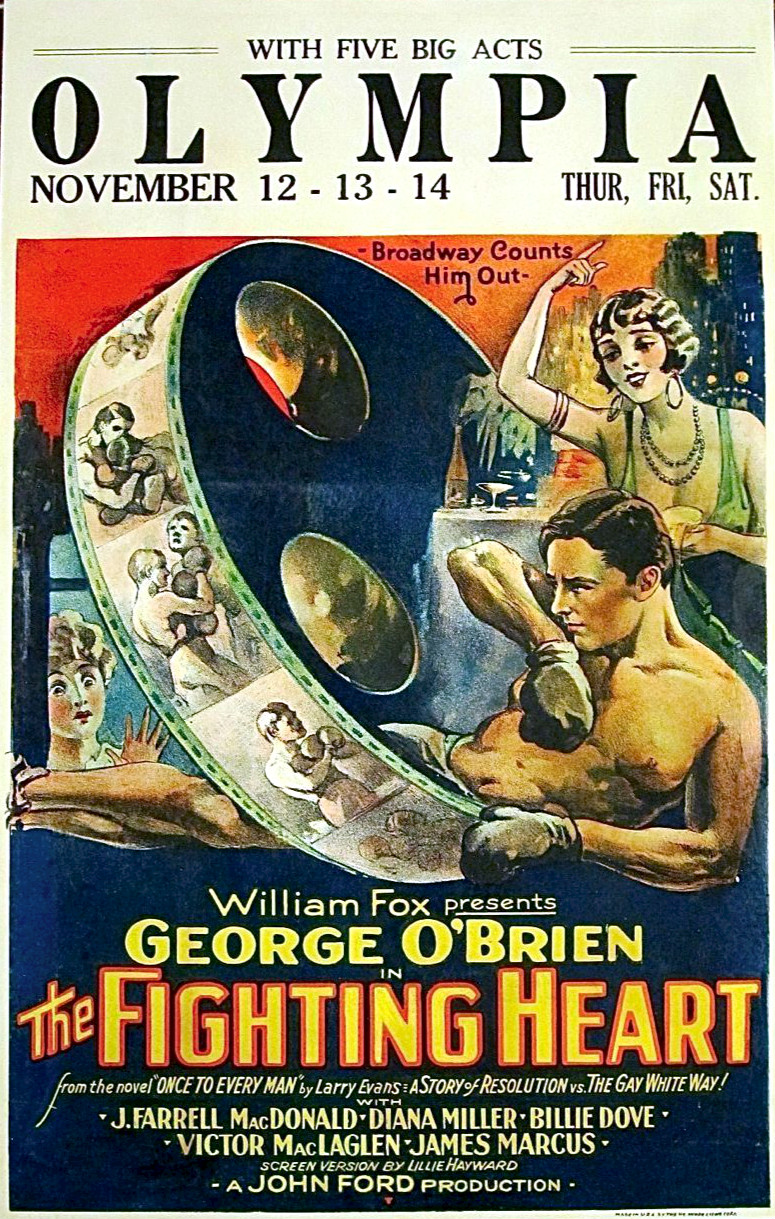
Poster for The Fighting Heart, a film based on Evans' novel Once to Every Man

- Evans wrote the story for the film His Own Home Town (1918)
- Some One in the House (1919)
- Money, Money, Money, a story Evans wrote that was adapted into a 1923 film of the same name.
- Once to Every Man, adapted to film as The Fighting Heart
- Winner Take All adapted into the film Winner Take All (1924 film)
