= Authors Film Company =

American film company

Author's Film Company was a film company in New York City from 1915 until 1918. An adaptation of Walt Mason's poem "The Dipper" was filmed in North Carolina. Addison J. Rothermel directed. In 1916, the firm released an Italian film retitled as Her Redemption about the sinking of the Lusitania. Plimpton Epic Film Company released through Author's Film Company.

Rothermel had stints at several film companies. His mother moved him and his brother Royale Valray Rothermel to a houseboat off Dyckman Street in New York City after her husband / their father died.

== Filmography ==
- The Gorgona (1915)
- Alsace (1916)
- Her Redemption (1916)
- Love's Sacrifice (1916)
- The Silent Witness (1917)
- Madame Sherry (1917)
- The Crucible of Life (1918), an adaptation of Bartley Campbell's Broadway show Fairfax.
