= The Invisible Ray =

The Invisible Ray may refer to:

- The Invisible Ray (1920 serial), film serial directed by Harry A. Pollard
- The Invisible Ray (1936 film), film starring Boris Karloff and Béla Lugosi
