= Leverington Cemetery =

Historic cemetery in Philadelphia, Pennsylvania USA

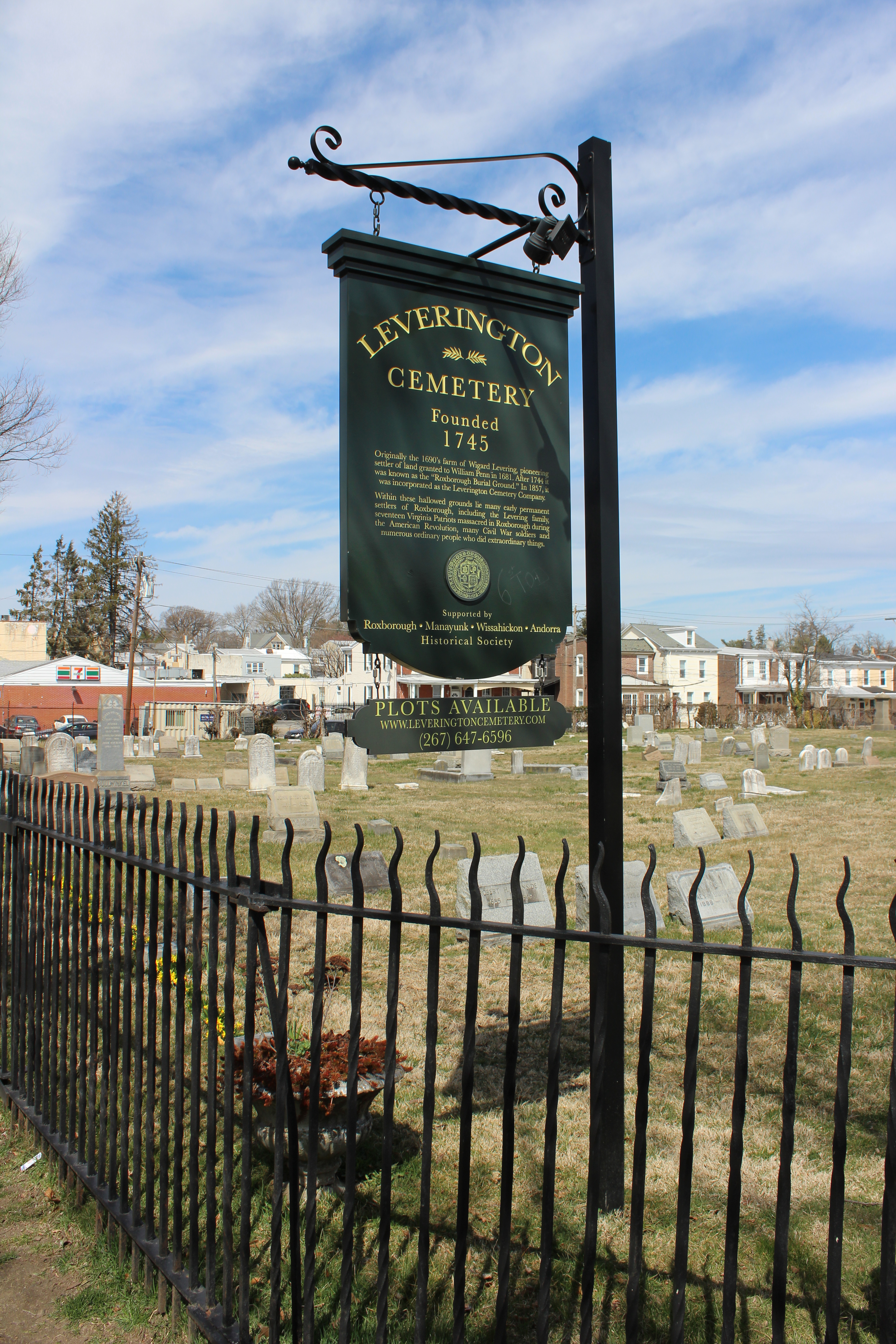
- Interactive map of Leverington Cemetery

Details
- Established: 1745; 281 years ago
- Location: 6075 Ridge Avenue, Philadelphia, Pennsylvania, U.S.
- Country: United States
- Coordinates: 40°02′02″N 75°12′47″W
- Type: Public
- Size: Nine acres
- Website: www.leveringtoncemetery.com
- Find a Grave: Leverington Cemetery

Leverington Cemetery is a historic non-denominational cemetery established in 1745 in the Roxborough neighborhood of Philadelphia, Pennsylvania, United States.

== Description ==
The cemetery is located at 6075 Ridge Avenue in the Roxborough neighborhood of Philadelphia, Pennsylvania, and covers nine acres.

The cemetery is open for new burials, but only had six between 2016 and 2019.

== History ==
The cemetery property was previously a farm owned by Wigand Levering in the 1690s. He was a settler on the land granted to William Penn in 1681. The cemetery started as a burial location on the farm for Levering and his family and after 1744, became known as the Roxborough Burial Ground. It became part of the Roxborough Baptist Church but ended its connection with the church and was incorporated as Leverington Cemetery Company in 1857.

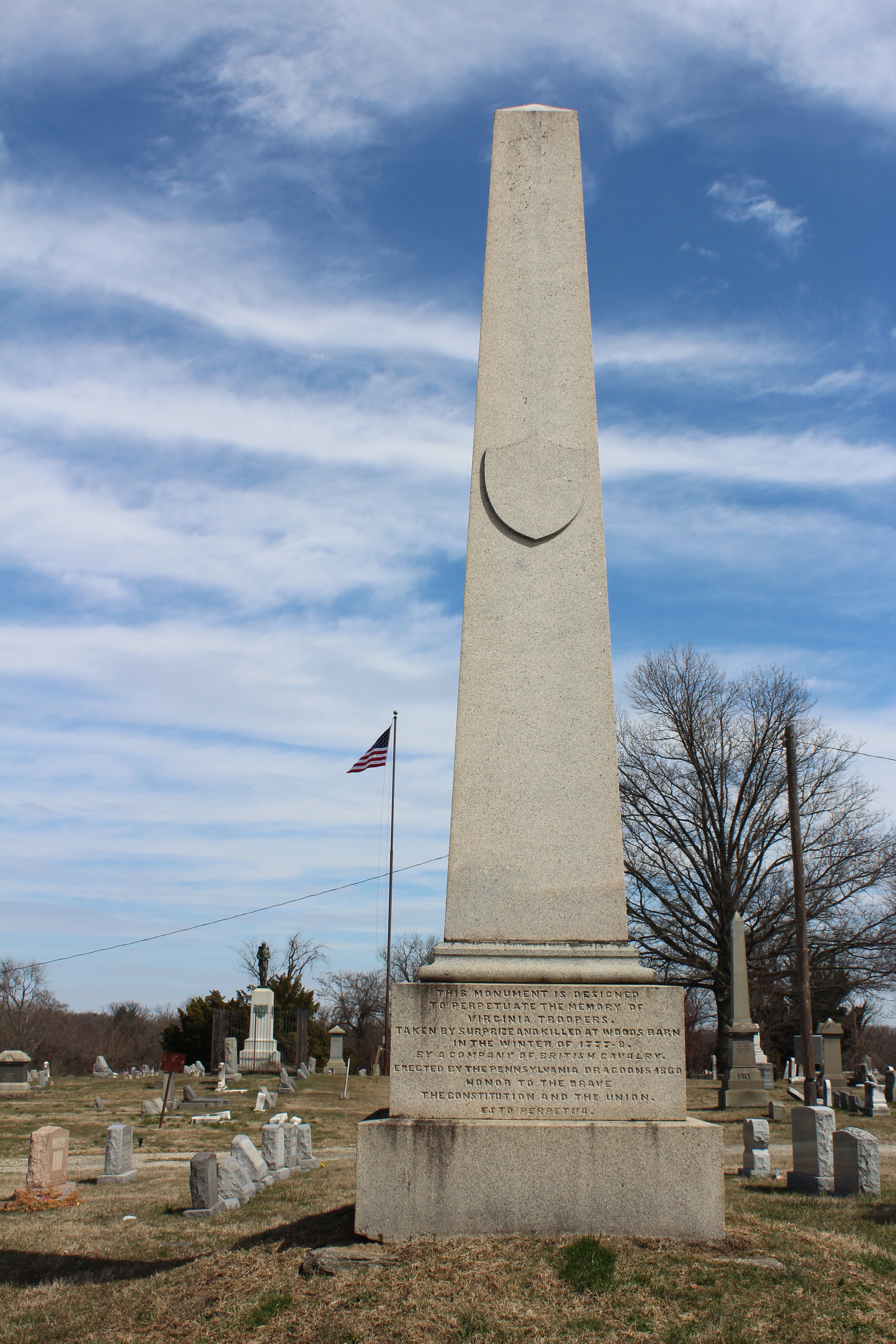
Monument for 17 American Revolutionary soldiers from Virginia buried in Leverington Cemetery

The cemetery contains the graves of 17 soldiers from Virginia killed by British troops in 1777 during the American Revolutionary War. The soldiers were trapped inside a barn set ablaze by British troops and shot as they tried to escape. An obelisk monument was built in the cemetery in their honor.

In 1872, a monument to the local soldiers who fought in the American Civil War was erected in Leverington Cemetery. The dedication ceremony was led by General George Meade.

By 1947, the cemetery was abandoned and had fallen into disrepair. The Philadelphia department store, Wannamaker's, wanted to purchase the land, relocate the bodies and use the property as a shopping center. Richard Lee Entwistle Jr. established the Leverington Cemetery Company and took control of the cemetery to prevent its destruction. The cemetery ownership has remained with the same family and is currently run by Entwistle's granddaughter, Randi Mautz.

Original burial records for the cemetery were lost in 1966 due to a fire. However, transcribed burial records are held by the Roxborough Manayunk Wissahickon Historical Society.

In 2013, WHYY-TV listed the cemetery as one of the top six haunted and eerie spots in Northwest Philadelphia since it was known as "one of the most actively documented locations for orbs and apparitions in Philadelphia".

== Notable burials ==
- Richard Harding Davis (1864–1916), journalist and writer
