= A Pair of Sixes (play) =

Play written by Edward Henry Peple

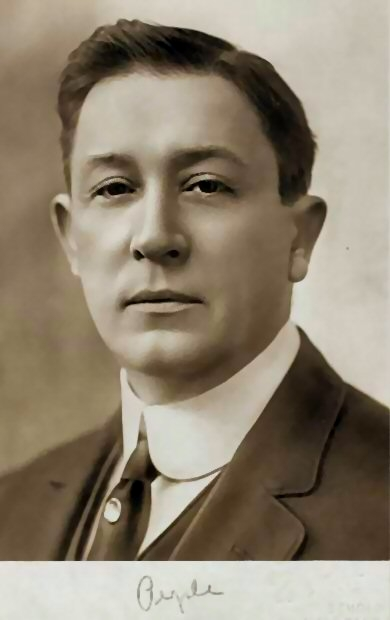
Edward Peple

A Pair of Sixes, originally titled The Party of the Second Part, is a farce in three acts by Edward Peple that made its Broadway debut at the Longacre Theatre on March 17, 1914. The piece was produced by Harry Frazee and achieved a run of two hundred and twenty-seven performances at the Longacre before closing in the third week of September 1914.

Over the following months A Pair of Sixes, reappeared at the Majestic Theatre in Brooklyn and Manhattan’s Standard Theatre. A national tour followed, as did runs at London’s Wyndham's Theatre and Her Majesty's Theatre, Melbourne. Peple's farce spawned a novel by Lilian Lauferty, a 1918 silent film A Pair of Sixes with Maude Eburne and Taylor Holmes and the 1926 hit Broadway musical comedy, Queen High, that in turn begat the 1930 Hollywood talkie Queen High starring Charles Ruggles, Frank Morgan and Ginger Rogers. In 1937 it was filmed as On Again-Off Again with the comedy team of Bert Wheeler and Robert Woolsey.

== Cast ==
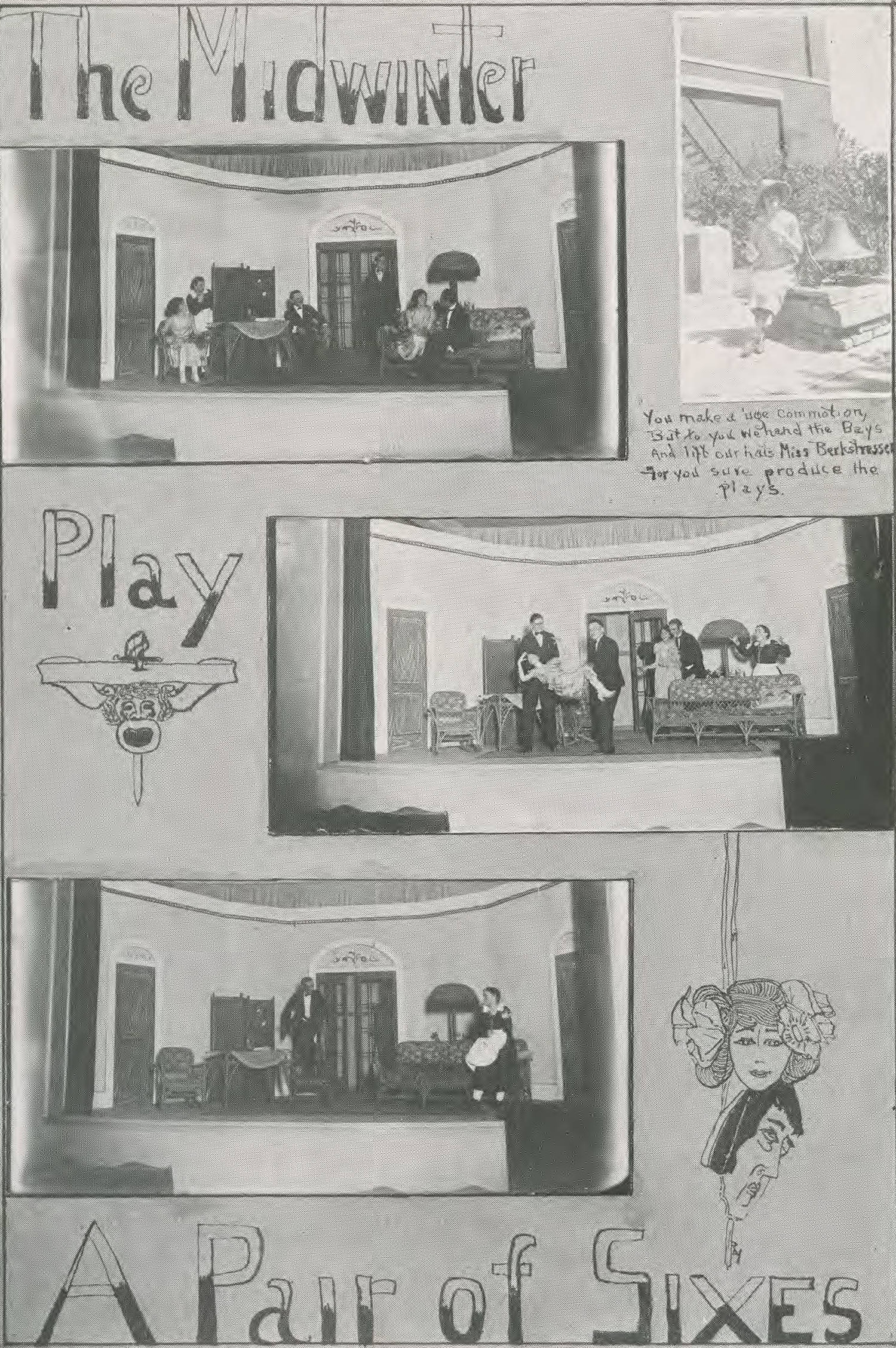
Scenes from the production of A Pair of Sixes at East Texas State Normal College in 1922

- Mr. Applegate ... Walter Allen
- Sally Parker (the stenographer) ... Carree Clark
- Tony Toler (salesman) ... Jack Devereaux
- Coddles (English maid) ... Maude Eburne
- Shipping Clerk ... Frank Gerbrach
- T. Boggs Johns ... Hale Hamilton
- Office Boy ... John Merritt
- Florence Cole ... Ann Murdock
- George B. Nettleton ... George Parsons
- Krome (book-keeper) ... Robert Smiley
- Mrs. George B. Nettleton ... Ivy Troutman
- Thomas J. Vanderholt (lawyer) ... Fritz Williams

Source: Theatre Magazine, May 1914

== Story ==
“A Pair of Sixes" is a farce comedy about two part owners of the Eureka Digestive Pill Company who rarely get along. Both claim the credit alone for the success of their popular purple pills. When their quarreling began to threaten the well being of the company, the firm’s lawyer suggests a rather odd solution. He would deal each partner a poker hand, with the understanding that the loser would serve as the other’s butler for an entire year. The outcome of the wager supplies the fodder for the farce.

== Reception ==
The new play by Edward Peple, which opened at Frazee's Longacre Theatre last week, has suffered perhaps from the enthusiastic encomiums of the daily press. It is an amusing farce, but it does not arouse the side-splitting merriment that we were led to expect by some of the critiques published after its premiere. The play cannot, however, be held responsible if it fails to match exactly the promise held out by critics who, after a succession of disastrous failures, were perhaps inclined to be over-indulgent in the presence of an undeniable success.

Mr. Peple has conceived of an excellent idea, the innate absurdity of which only commends it for farcical purposes. The two partners of a successful pill industry, failing to agree on any subject, call in the assistance of their lawyer. The partnership cannot be dissolved, for neither one will buy out the other; so the lawyer, in order that the farce may proceed to its appointed conclusion, hits on the device of deciding by a single hand of poker which partner shall continue to conduct the business for a year, and which shall serve the winner in a menial capacity during that period. A pair of sixes in the hand of George B. Nettleton gives him the advantage, and enables the author in the second act to present to us T. Boggs John in the capacity of his partner's butler.

The possibilities of the situation are obvious, and Mr. Peple has on the whole made good use of them. The play has one conspicuous merit in that the interest increases throughout and the last act is the best of the three. There are moments of dullness, notably in those scenes in which Nettleton‘s wife predominates, but there are a number of laughable situations and many good lines, and the climax, in which the subtle Boggs John, under the inspiration of his astute fiancée (well played by Miss Ann Murdock), delivers himself from servitude by his attentions to his master's wife, is ingenious. The play is well cast throughout, and George Parsons and Hale Hamilton are excellent as the two partners, while an individual success is made by Miss Maude Eburne as Coddles, the English maid-of-all-work. If we are prepared to grant that the natural destiny of our native farce is to be developed through a crescendo of noise, "A Pair of Sixes" thoroughly deserves the success that it promises to enjoy. We may, however, make the mental reservation that a certain amount of subtlety is not incompatible with the true spirit of farce. The Nation, 1914.

‘A Pair of Sixes’ is the kind of farce which has no nationality, except as its rapid-fire development, its breezy humor, and its care for a certain surface reality brand it as American. The same may, perhaps, be said of ‘Seven Keys to Baldpate.’ Mr. Craven's play, however, and ‘Potash and Perlmutter’ are both products of actual conditions in the life about us, and are for that reason much more significant. The Literary Digest 1914
