= The Silent Witness (1917 film) =

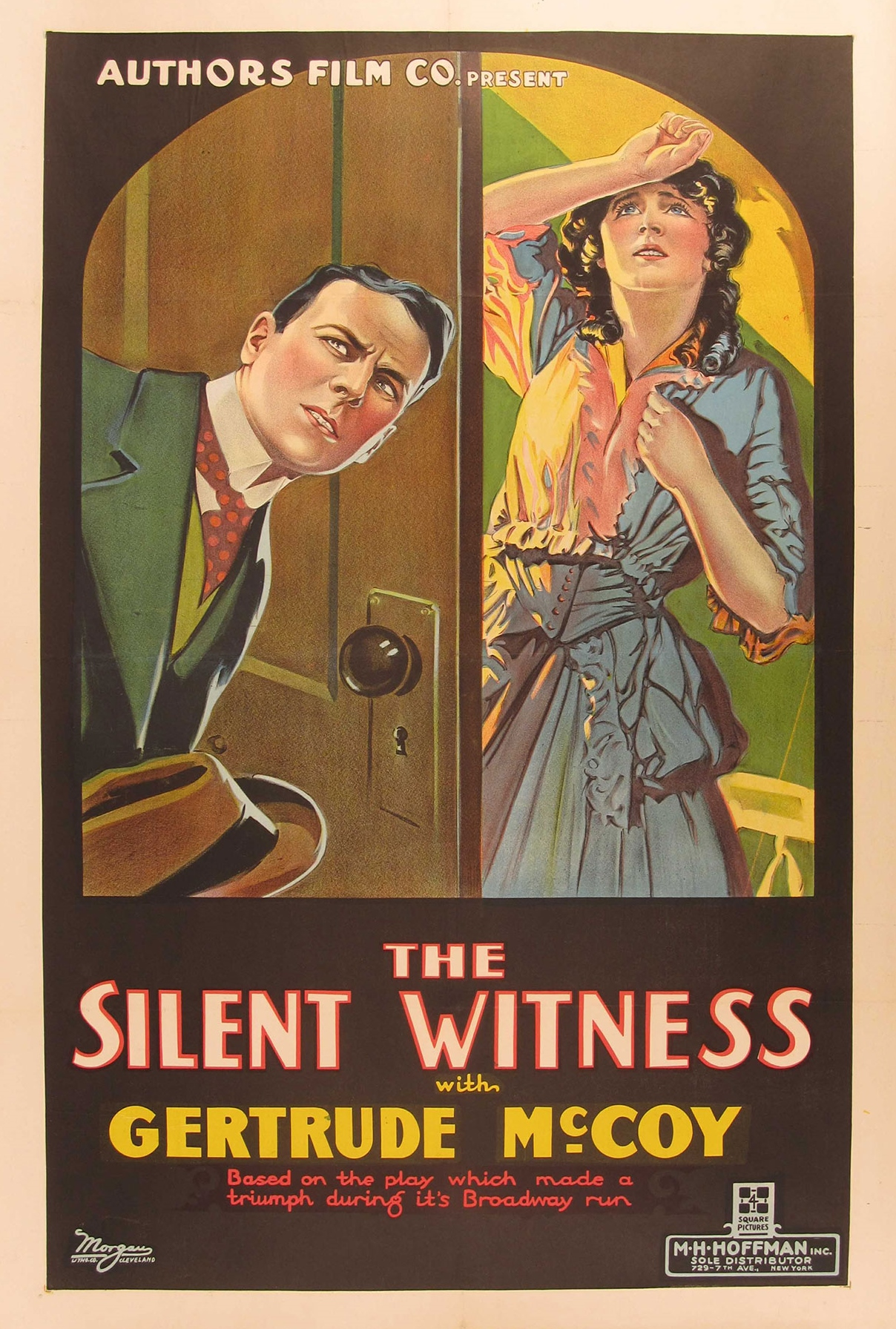
- Directed by: Harry Lambart
- Written by: Otto Hauerbach (play)
- Starring: Gertrude McCoy; Frank O'Connor; Jack Sherrill
- Production company: Authors Film Company
- Distributed by: M.H. Hoffman Distribution
- Release date: September 1, 1917
- Running time: 70 minutes
- Country: United States
- Languages: Silent; English intertitles

The Silent Witness is a 1917 American silent independent drama film directed by Harry Lambart and starring Gertrude McCoy, Frank O'Connor and Jack Sherrill. It was based on the 1916 Broadway play The Silent Witness by Otto Hauerbach.

== Cast ==
- Gertrude McCoy as Helen Hastings
- Frank O'Connor as Richard Morgan
- Edwin Forsberg as John Pellman
- Junius Matthews as Bud Morgan
- Alphie James as Sarah Blakely
- Helen May as Janet Rigsby
- Roulef E. Cotton as Wilbur Weldon
- Jack Sherrill as Travers
- A.J. Herbert as Norman Blakely
- Fred Graham as Rigsby
- Albert Phillips as Mr. Weldon

== Bibliography ==
- Curtis Marez. University Babylon: Film and Race Politics on Campus. Univ of California Press, 2019.
