= Pursued (1934 film) =

1934 film by Louis King

- Directed by: Louis King
- Written by: Stuart Anthony; Lester Cole
- Based on: The Painted Lady by Larry Evans
- Produced by: Sol Wurtzel
- Starring: Rosemary Ames; Victor Jory; Russell Hardie
- Cinematography: L. William O'Connell
- Edited by: Alfred DeGaetano
- Music by: David Buttolph; Hugo Friedhofer; Samuel Kaylin
- Production company: Fox Film Corporation
- Distributed by: Fox Film Corporation
- Release date: August 24, 1934
- Running time: 68 minutes
- Country: United States
- Language: English

Pursued is a 1934 American drama film directed by Louis King and starring Rosemary Ames, Victor Jory and Russell Hardie. Produced and distributed by Fox Film Corporation. It is based on a story from the Saturday Evening Post, The Painted Lady, by Larry Evans. It was previously filmed by Fox as a silent When a Man Sees Red in 1917.

== Plot ==
A San Francisco man inherits a plantation in British North Borneo from his uncle. He clashes with a neighbouring plantation owner who organizes an attack on him. He is nursed back health by Mona a nightclub singer.

== Cast ==
- Rosemary Ames as Mona
- Victor Jory as Beauregard
- Russell Hardie as David Landeen
- George Irving as Dr. Otto Steiner
- Chan Jim as Bird Seller
- Nora Cecil as Tourist Welfare Worker
- James Dime as Malays
- Miss Frieda as Dancer
- Douglas Gerrard as English Sailor
- John Gough as Mate
- Virginia Hills as Percentage Girl
- Pert Kelton as Gilda
- Elsie Larson as Percentage Girl
- Margaret Mann as Tourist
- Torben Meyer as Hansen
- Lucille Miller as Percentage Girl
- Stanley Price as Servant
- Constance Purdy as tourist Welfare Worker
- Tom Ricketts as Tourist
- John Rogers as Ship's Steward
- Betty Schofield as Dancer
- Allan Sears as Mate
- Harry Semels as Cafe Proprietor
- Ella Serrurier as Dancer
