= Guy McConnell =

American film director

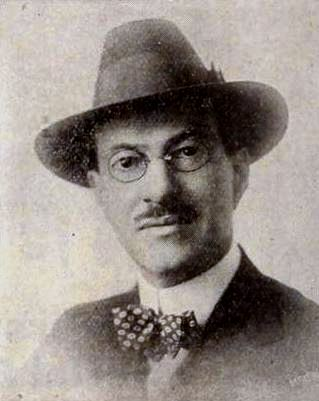
1917

Guy W. McConnell (1878 - February 4, 1948) was a film writer, director and producer, and was also the leader of the short-lived Wholesome Films company. Under McConnell's leadership, the company pledged to adapt stories true to original author's work.

He lived in Wrightstown, Pennsylvania.

== Filmography ==
- Cinderella and the Magic Slipper (1917), director
- The Penny Philanthropist (1917), director
- Pearl of the Army (1917), story
- The Invisible Ray (1920), a serial
- Tropical Love (1921)
