= Then I'll Come Back to You =

1916 silent film

- Directed by: George Irving
- Written by: Larry Evans (novel); Frances Marion
- Starring: Alice Brady; Jack Sherrill; Eric Blind
- Production company: Frohman Amusement Corporation
- Distributed by: World Film
- Release date: April 3, 1916
- Running time: 50 minutes
- Country: United States
- Languages: Silent; English intertitles

Then I'll Come Back to You is a lost 1916 American silent drama film directed by George Irving and starring Alice Brady, Jack Sherrill and Eric Blind. It is based on the novel of the same title by Larry Evans.

== Cast ==
- Alice Brady as Barbara Allison
- Jack Sherrill as Steve O'Mara
- Eric Blind as Caleb Hunter
- Leo Gordon as Archie Wickersham
- George Kline as Harrigan
- Marie Wells as Miriam
- Ted Dean as Little Stevie

== Plot ==
Young Steve O'Mara, after losing his father, is brought up by his foster father, old Tom, living in the Adirondack Mountains. After old Tom dies he is taken in by a well-to-do family. Steve, who loves to fight is attracted to Barbara, a young girl who is visiting the family, but she is repelled by his violent behaviour. He gets into a fight with another boy, Archie Wickersham, over her affections and beats him. Barbara sides with the beaten boy and scolds Steve over his violent ways. Rejected, Steve leaves and vows not to return until he has changed his ways and made good.

Ten years pass, during which Steve has become a railroad construction engineer with the East Coast Railroad Company. He is trying to complete a railroad being built through his home town, which must be completed by 1 May, to ship lumber for the lumber king Dexter Allison, Barbara's father. Barbara is now engaged to Archie Wickersham, who has grown up to become a financier. Dexter Allison has obtained a loan from Wickersham to finance the transport of lumber and the two plot to gain control of the railroad.

Wickersham tries by unscrupulous methods to prevent the railroad from being completed and hires a thug named Harrigan to sabotage the railroad by any means. Harrigan's attempts are unsuccessful and he attacks Steve but loses the fight. Barbara witnesses the fight, and is so horrified at the sight of blood that she runs off into the forest and becomes lost. A search party is formed, and Steve finds her. After caring for her during the night, he takes her to her father the next morning and returns to work. Barbara realizes that she really loves Steve and has come to despise Archie for his underhand methods.

She starts off on horseback to overtake Steve. As she reaches him, a shot rings out from the nearby bushes and Steve is wounded. As she goes to help him she hears Harrigan shout, "Now I will finish him." Barbara draws Steve's pistol, and with a lucky shot, shoots Harrigan. She then tells Steve that she can now love only him and the picture ends with the two in each other's arms.

== Preservation ==
With no holdings located in archives, Then I'll Come Back to You is considered a lost film.

== Bibliography ==
- Goble, Alan. The Complete Index to Literary Sources in Film. Walter de Gruyter, 1999.
