= Eugene Aram (1915 film) =

- Directed by: Richard Ridgely
- Written by: Edward Bulwer-Lytton (novel); Richard Ridgely
- Starring: Marc McDermott; Mabel Trunnelle; Gladys Hulette
- Production company: Edison Company
- Distributed by: General Film Company
- Release date: July 9, 1915
- Country: United States
- Languages: Silent; English intertitles

Eugene Aram is a 1915 American silent historical film directed by Richard Ridgely and starring Marc McDermott, Mabel Trunnelle and Gladys Hulette. It is an adaptation of the 1832 novel Eugene Aram by Edward Bulwer-Lytton.

== Plot ==
Eugene Aram is a down-on-his luck character, who is explained to be a distant relation of Richard Housman, who is a criminal just trying to get by. Housman is entertained by Eugene's problems. Eugene is trying to teach himself and devises his own curriculum, but fails.

Housman comes across a letter written by a man named Clark Lester to his son, Walter. The letter promises a reward of jewels and valuables to Walter, who has saved a man's life in India. The letter came from Grassdale, England. Housman decides that he should rob Clark of his jewels and valuables, and takes Eugene along with him.

In Grassdale, Housman attacks Clark, just as Eugene comes along to find the two. Eugene seizes Clark, and Clark is killed by Housman. Eaten with remorse, Eugene refuses to take anything from Housman.

Five years later, Eugene is a school teacher in Grassdale. Walter, the son of the dead Clark, lives in Grassdale and is in love with a woman named Madeline. Madeline does not care about Walter at all, but her sister, Eleanor, loves him.

Aram is struggling with the guilt of killing Clark. Everything seems to be conspiring to remind him that he killed a man. Even his pupils seem to put too much emphasis on certain words and sentences. Eugene meets Madeline and they fall in love. This, of course, enrages Walter. He warns Madeline that Eugene is no good.

Housman is now a professional thief. He and his gang force themselves into the Lester home and run into Eugene, who shoots Housman. Housman asks Eugene to meet him at the glen the next day. At the glen, Housman demands money to keep him quiet, or else he will inform Eugene's friends about Clark's murder. Eugene agrees, and travels to London to give Housman his money. Housman promises to leave the country.

Back in Grassdale, Walter keeps insulting Eugene to Madeline's face. Housman receives word that his daughter, Ann, is dying. He besieges Walter on his way to London and steals his horse, renowned for its speed. However, he is too late. Ann has already died. He finds Ann dead and stumbles off to the nearest inn, to get drunk.

At the inn, some strangers are discussing the unearthing of a skeleton. They believe it to be Clark's skeleton, who was said to have gone missing five years earlier. Walter enters the inn and is listening. Housman drunkenly gets up and says they are wrong, and he knows where Clark's body is. He takes them to St. Robert's cave, unearths the skeleton of Clark, and then tells Walter that Eugene committed the murder.

Eugene is arrested, tried, and condemned based on Housman's testimony. Walter asks Eugene to confess, and Eugene tells the whole story. However, this does not take away his sentence. Madeline hears of his sentence and dies on the spot. The movie ends with Eugene being hanged for his crime.

== Cast ==
- Marc McDermott as Eugene Aram
- Mabel Trunnelle as Madeline Lester
- Gladys Hulette as Eleanor Lester
- Herbert Prior as Richard Housman
- George A. Wright as Geoffrey Lester
- Edward Earle as Walter Lester
- Bigelow Cooper as Roland Lester

== Bibliography ==
- Goble, Alan. The Complete Index to Literary Sources in Film. Walter de Gruyter, 1999.
