= The Accomplice (1917 film) =

- Directed by: Ralph Dean
- Written by: Anthony Paul Kelly
- Produced by: William L. Sherrill
- Starring: Dorothy Bernard; Jack Sherrill; Jean Stuart
- Cinematography: William A. Reinhart
- Production company: William L. Sherrill Feature Corporation
- Distributed by: Art Dramas
- Release date: February 8, 1917
- Running time: 50 minutes
- Country: United States
- Languages: Silent; English intertitles

The Accomplice is a lost 1917 American silent drama film directed by Ralph Dean and starring Dorothy Bernard, Jack Sherrill and Jean Stuart.

== Plot ==
Spoiled and lonely daughter of a wealthy Wall Street entrepreneur, Katherine Harcourt, wanders into the Tango Tea Set and meets the charismatic Antonio, a professional dancer. Infatuated, Katherine follows Antonio to his hotel room but, at the last moment, rejects his advances and leaves at the point of a knife. Later that night, Pepita, Antonio's lover, is found murdered and Antonio is arrested.

As his alibi, Antonio claims that he was with Katherine. To save the Harcourt name from scandal, Miriam Collins, the sweetheart of Dick Harcourt, Katherine's brother, says that she, not Katherine, was in Antonio's room. Although Miriam's gesture is an attempt to improve her image with Dick's father, who thinks that she is too poor for his son, it soon backfires and Dick breaks off their engagement.

Guilt-ridden, Katherine finally confesses to knowing Antonio, clearing both her own and Miriam's name. With the blessing of Mr. Harcourt, Miriam and Dick reunite.

== Cast ==
- Dorothy Bernard as Katherine Harcourt
- Jack Sherrill as Dick Harcourt
- W.J. Brady as Honorable Nicholas Harcourt
- Joseph Granby as Antonio
- Jean Stuart as Pepita
- Florence Hamilton as Miriam Collins
- John A. Milton as Inspector
- Tom Ward as Jose

== Preservation ==
With no holdings located in archives, The Accomplice is considered a lost film.

== Bibliography ==
- Jay Robert Nash & Stanley Ralph Ross. The Motion Picture Guide, Volume 10. Cinebooks, 1985.
