= Where Love Is =

1917 film

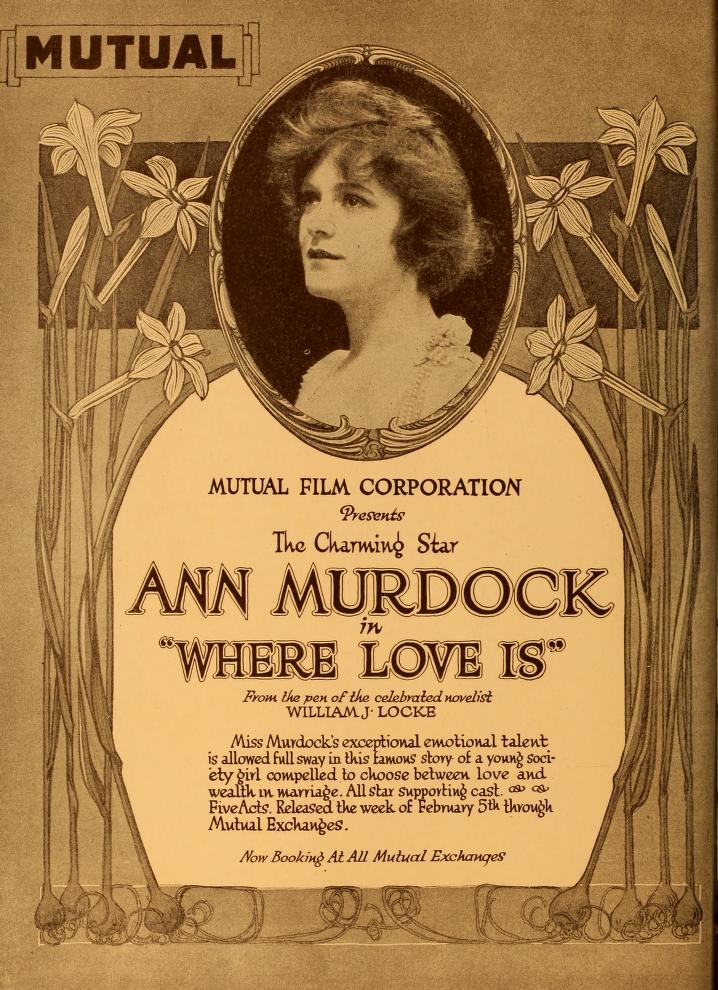
- Written by: William J. Locke
- Distributed by: Mutual Film Corporation
- Release date: February 5, 1917
- Running time: 5 reels
- Country: USA
- Language: Silent..English titles

Where Love Is is a 1917 silent film drama based on the 1903 novel by William J. Locke and starring Ann Murdock.

An incomplete copy is preserved at the Library of Congress.

== Cast ==
- Ann Murdock - Norma Hardacre
- Shirley Mason - Aline Marden
- Mabel Trunnelle - Mrs. Constance Deering
- Henry Stanford - Jimmie Padgate
- Bigelow Cooper - Morland King
- William Wadsworth - Theodore Weever
- Raymond McKee - Tony Merewether
- Helen Strickland - ?unknown role
- Edith Wright - ?unknown role
- Jessie Stevens - ?unknown role
