= Pride (1917 film) =

- Directed by: Richard Ridgely
- Starring: Holbrook Blinn; Shirley Mason; George Le Guere
- Cinematography: George W. Lane
- Production company: McClure Publishing
- Distributed by: Triangle Distributing
- Release date: February 5, 1917
- Country: United States
- Languages: Silent; English intertitles

Pride is a 1917 American silent drama film directed by Richard Ridgely and starring Holbrook Blinn, Shirley Mason and George Le Guere. It was part of a series featuring portrayals of the seven deadly sins.

== Cast ==
- Holbrook Blinn as Eugene D'Arcy
- Shirley Mason as Eve Leslie
- George Le Guere as Adam Moore
- Helen Strickland as Miss Nelson Blanchard
- Guido Colucci as Le Comte de Frais

== Bibliography ==
- Langman, Larry. American Film Cycles: The Silent Era. Greenwood Publishing, 1998.
