= The Fighting Heart (1925 film) =

1925 film directed by John Ford

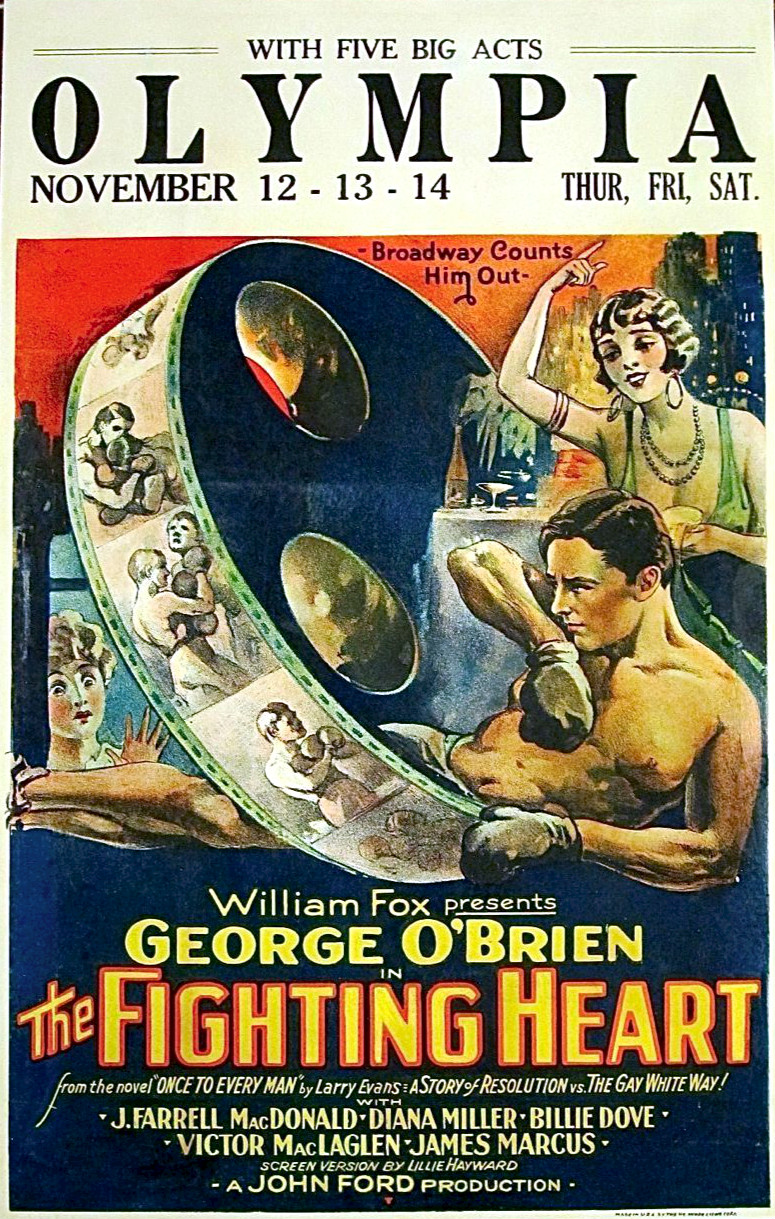
- Film poster
- Directed by: John Ford
- Written by: Lillie Hayward
- Based on: Once to Every Man by Larry Evans
- Starring: George O'Brien; Billie Dove
- Cinematography: Joseph H. August
- Distributed by: Fox Film Corporation
- Release date: October 18, 1925
- Running time: 70 minutes
- Country: United States
- Language: Silent (English intertitles)

The Fighting Heart is a lost 1925 American silent drama film directed by John Ford.

== Plot ==
As described in a film magazine review, a young man with an inheritance of alcoholism whips a prize fighter in a street fight but falls from his sweetheart’s graces. He goes to New York City and is beaten in a fight in the ring. Later, he whips the fighter again outside the ring and, having left off drinking, is now accepted by the young woman.

== Cast ==
- George O'Brien as Denny Bolton
- Billie Dove as Doris Anderson
- J. Farrell MacDonald as Jerry
- Victor McLaglen as Soapy Williams
- Diana Miller as Helen Van Allen
- Bert Woodruff as Grandfather
- Francis Powers as John Anderson
- Francis Ford as Town Fool
- Hazel Howell as Oklahoma Kate
- Edward Peil Sr. as Flash Fogarty (credited as Edward Piel)
- James A. Marcus as Judge Maynard (credited as James Marcus)
- Frank Baker
- Harvey Clark
- Lynn Cowan
- Hank Mann

== Censorship ==
Before The Fighting Heart could be exhibited in Kansas, the Kansas Board of Review required the removal of several scenes and one intertitle. The scenes eliminated included most of the drinking, close-ups of "Demijohn", and "suggestion with baby," and the intertitle removed said "Soapy Williams, who runs the hotel, is a wise bootlegger - he never drinks."

== Preservation ==
With no prints of The Fighting Heart located in any film archives, it is now considered to be a lost film.

== See also ==
- List of lost films
