= The Heart of the Hills (1916 film) =

1916 silent film

- Directed by: Richard Ridgely
- Written by: David Whitelaw
- Starring: Mabel Trunnelle; Conway Tearle; Raymond McKee
- Cinematography: George W. Lane
- Production company: Edison Studios
- Distributed by: K-E-S-E Service
- Release date: October 30, 1916
- Running time: 50 minutes
- Country: United States
- Languages: Silent; English intertitles

The Heart of the Hills is a 1916 American silent drama film directed by Richard Ridgely and starring Mabel Trunnelle, Conway Tearle and Raymond McKee.

== Cast ==
- Mabel Trunnelle as Hester
- Conway Tearle as Redgell
- Bigelow Cooper as Sir Christopher Madgwick
- Raymond McKee as Eric
- Marie La Corio as Edith
- Herbert Prior as Ali
- George A. Wright as Sani
- Robert Conness as Karaji
- Edith Strickland as Natali
- Crauford Kent as McInnes
- Charles Sutton as Dr. Pettigrew
- Henry Leone as Darton

== Bibliography ==
- John T. Soister, Henry Nicolella & Steve Joyce. American Silent Horror, Science Fiction and Fantasy Feature Films, 1913-1929. McFarland, 2014.
