= Robert Conness =

American actor

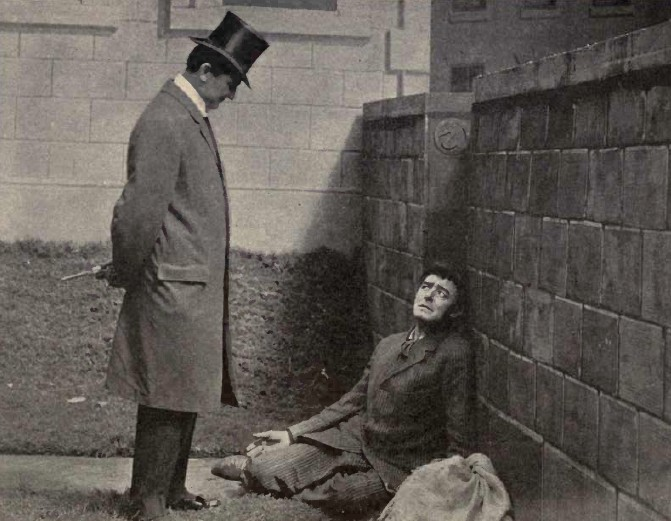
- Robert Conness and Marc McDermott in Van Bibber's Experiment (1911).
- Born: December 24, 1867; La Salle, Illinois
- Died: January 15, 1941 (aged 73); Portland, Maine
- Resting place: Moravian Cemetery New Dorp, New York (Richmond County)
- Occupation: actor
- Spouse: Helen Strickland

Robert Conness (1867/68 – 1941) was an American stage and film actor. Born in 1867 or 1868, he began in the theatre in 1894 and performed in vaudeville and on Broadway. He began in silent film in 1910 and made his last film appearance in 1918. He was married to actress Helen Strickland.

== Filmography ==
- Her First Appearance (1910 short)
- The Piece of Lace (1910 short)
- Bootles' Baby (1910 short)
- Monsieur (1911 short)
- How the Hungry Man Was Fed (1911 short)
- The Wager and the Wage Earners (1911 short)
- Van Bibber's Experiment (1911 short)
- His Misjudgment (1911 short)
- The Little Organist (1912 short)
- The Stolen Nickel (1912 short)
- His Daughter (1912 short)
- Children Who Labor (1912 short)
- Church and Country (1912 short)
- The Blue Coyote Cherry Crop (1914 short)
- The Long Way (1914 short)
- A Fragment of Ash (1914 short)
- The Case of the Vanished Bonds (1914 short)
- Bootle's Baby (1914 short) (possibly a rerelease or remake of 1910 short)
- Dickson's Diamonds (1914 short)
- The Last of the Hargroves (1914 short)
- The Colonel of the Red Hussars (1914 short)
- The Man Who Vanished (1914 short)
- Young Mrs. Winthrop (1915 short)
- The Banker's Double (1915 short)
- Her Husband's Son (1915 short)
- In Spite of All (1915 short)
- The Portrait in the Attic (1915 short)
- The Stoning (1915 short)
- The House of the Lost Court (1915 short)
- The Tragedies of the Crystal Globe (1915 short)
- On Dangerous Paths (1915)
- June Friday (1915)
- The Ploushshare (1915)
- Gladiola (1915)
- Children of Eve (1915)
- The Truth About Helen (1915)
- The Heart of the Hills (1916)
- The Martyrdom of Philip Strong (1916)
- The Witching Hour (1916)
- A Message to Garcia (1916)
- The Rainbow (1917)
- A Song of Sixpence (1917)
- The Ghost of Old Morro (1917)
- A Pair of Sixes (1918)
