= Tropical Love =

1921 film

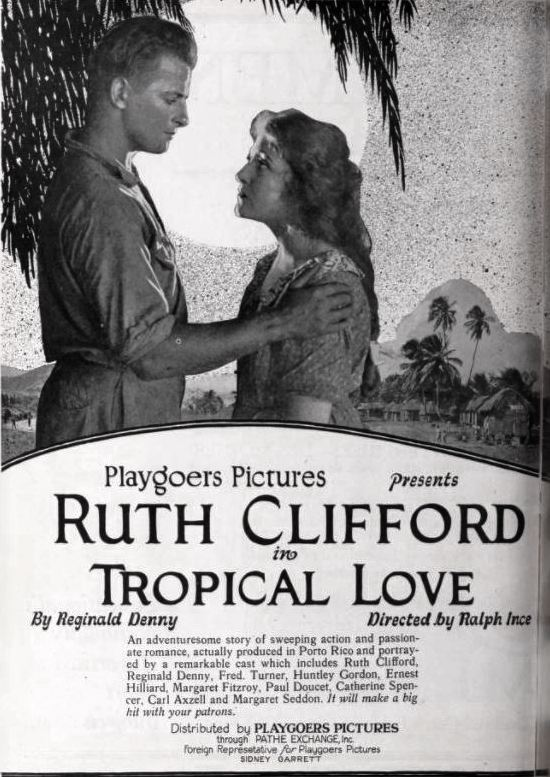
- Directed by: Ralph Ince
- Written by: Reginald Denny
- Based on: Peaks of Gold by Guy McConnell
- Starring: Ruth Clifford; Reginald Denny; Huntley Gordon
- Cinematography: William J. Black
- Production companies: Playgoers Pictures; Porto Rico Photoplays
- Distributed by: Associated Exhibitors
- Release date: October 23, 1921
- Running time: 50 minutes
- Country: United States
- Languages: Silent; English intertitles

Tropical Love is a 1921 American silent drama film directed by Ralph Ince and starring Ruth Clifford, Reginald Denny and Huntley Gordon. It was partly shot on location in Puerto Rico.

== Cast ==
- Ruth Clifford as Rosario
- F.A. Turner as The Seeker
- Reginald Denny as The Drifter
- Huntley Gordon as Clifford Fayne
- Ernest Hilliard as Carlos Blasco
- Carl Axzelle as Miguel
- Margaret Cullington as Mercedita
- Paul Doucet as Pedro

== Bibliography ==
- Munden, Kenneth White. The American Film Institute Catalog of Motion Pictures Produced in the United States, Part 1. University of California Press, 1997.
