= The Make-Believe Wife =

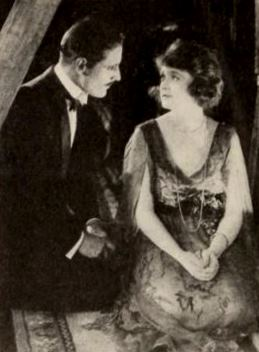
- Still with David Powell and Billie Burke
- Directed by: John S. Robertson
- Written by: Edward Childs Carpenter (screen story); Adrian Gil-Spear (scenario)
- Produced by: Adolph Zukor; Jesse Lasky
- Starring: Billie Burke
- Cinematography: William Marshall
- Distributed by: Paramount Pictures
- Release date: November 17, 1918
- Running time: 50 minutes
- Country: United States
- Language: Silent (English intertitles)

The Make-Believe Wife is a lost 1918 American silent comedy film starring Billie Burke and directed by John S. Robertson. Based on an original story for the screen, it was produced by Famous Players–Lasky and distributed by Paramount Pictures.

== Cast ==
- Billie Burke as Phyllis Ashbrook
- Alfred Hickman as Roger Mason
- Ida Darling as Mrs. Ashbrook
- David Powell as John Manning
- Wray Page as Anita Webb
- Isabel O'Madigan as Mrs. Harbury
- Frances Kaye as Eileen Harbury
- Bigelow Cooper as Mr. Ashbrook
- Howard Johnson as Donald Ashbrook
- F. Gatenbery Bell as Mr. Harbury

== Reception ==
Like many American films of the time, The Make-Believe Wife was subject to cuts by city and state film censorship boards. For example, the Chicago Board of Censors required a cut, in Reel 4, of the five intertitles "Marian?", "Ethel?", "Daisy?", "Louise, Mabel, Irene," etc., and "Oh, Geraldine", scene of man looking at picture and at woman's underwear and nodding head, and the two intertitles "I give you my word that I don't know who is in that room" and "I thought my past was dead".
