= Jean Stuart =

American actress (1906–1926)

Jean Stuart (July 13, 1906 – November 13, 1926) was an American actress from California who had a brief career in silent movies. Her real name was Margaret Leisenring.

== College student ==
She was a popular student at the University of California, Berkeley and was a member of the Alpha Delta Pi sorority. She was an officer of the senior class. Her father, Dr. L.M. Leisenring, was a physician of the San Francisco Bay District who was superintendent of a Vallejo, California sanitarium.

== Silent films ==
Stuart played in eight silent films, beginning with a role as Sonia Mercer in The Flash of an Emerald (1915). Later she appeared in The Scarlet Runner (1916), The Libertine (1916), Strife (1917), The Rainbow (1917), The Accomplice (1917), God's Man (1917), and Madame Sherry (1917).

She was chosen the winner of college girl contest when she was a senior in college. A committee then chose her to play a role in The Campus Flirt, which co-starred Charles Paddock. Her selection came after it was suggested by actress Bebe Daniels. Stuart played with Daniels in the film and left school to sign a contract with Universal Pictures.

== Death ==
On a Sunday afternoon in November 1926, Stuart was riding horseback with some friends from the Studio Club, 1215 Lodi Place, Beverly Hills, California, where she resided. Her horse slipped on wet pavement and threw her on her head. Her injuries were not considered serious at first, but she developed a cerebral hemorrhage and died at 6 a.m. the following day at Hollywood Hospital.

The Los Angeles Coroner's office decided that an inquest into her death was necessary. She was working on a series of collegiate films when she died. A newspaper account said "Death ended yesterday what promised to be a brilliant career in the silent drama."
