= The Rainbow (1917 film) =

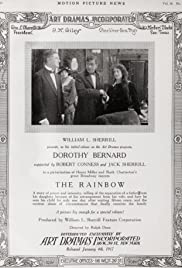
- Directed by: Ralph Dean
- Written by: A.E. Thomas (play); Thomas J. Kelly
- Produced by: William L. Sherrill
- Starring: Dorothy Bernard; Robert Conness; Jack Sherrill
- Cinematography: William A. Reinhart
- Production company: William L. Sherrill Feature Corporation
- Distributed by: Art Dramas
- Release date: January 4, 1917
- Running time: 60 minutes
- Country: United States
- Languages: Silent; English intertitles

The Rainbow is a 1917 American silent drama film directed by Ralph Dean and starring Dorothy Bernard, Robert Conness and Jack Sherrill.

== Cast ==
- Dorothy Bernard as Cynthia
- Robert Conness as Neil Sumner
- Jack Sherrill as Dick Harcourt
- Eleanor Gist as Ruth Sumner
- Jean Stuart as Betsy
- Marion Adams as Baby Cynthia
- Jean La Motte as Mrs. Palmer
- Jack Hopkins as Hollins
- H. Conway Wingfield as Fellowes

== Bibliography ==
- Robert B. Connelly. The Silents: Silent Feature Films, 1910-36, Volume 40, Issue 2. December Press, 1998.
