= When a Man Sees Red (1917 film) =

1917 film by Franck Lloyd

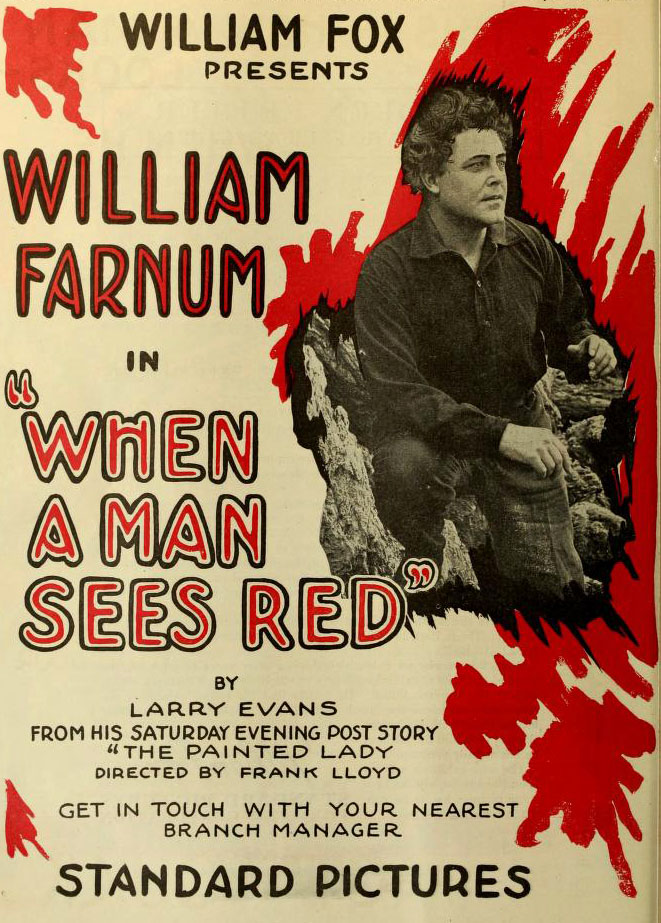
- Advertisement.
- Directed by: Frank Lloyd
- Written by: Larry Evans (story); Frank Lloyd (scenario)
- Produced by: William Fox
- Starring: William Farnum
- Cinematography: William C. Foster
- Distributed by: Fox Film Corporation
- Release date: October 28, 1917
- Running time: 5-7 reels
- Country: United States
- Language: Silent (English intertitles)

When a Man Sees Red is a 1917 American silent drama film produced and distributed by the Fox Film Corporation and directed by Frank Lloyd. William Farnum stars in this now lost film. It was remade in 1934 as Pursued.

This was the debut film of prolific character actor Frank Ellis.

== Plot ==
As described in a film magazine, after a long sea voyage, Larry Smith comes home to find his sister dead, the victim of some unknown person. Shortly after his mother dies of a broken heart, Smith sets sail with a determination to wreck vengeance upon the murderer. Unknowingly he has become a mate to Captain Sutton, the man who ruined his sister. At a South Sea port Smith meets Violet North, known as the Painted Lady. Smith falls in love with her and proposes, but she will not marry him because of her past, and the next day sails away with the rest of her party. Logan, one of the "dogs" on Sutton's vessel, was a witness to Sutton's attack on the Smith girl and for this reason Sutton sails away leaving Logan on shore alone. Logan meets Smith and tells his tale. Logan and Smith search the islands for a trace of Sutton. When a storm rises and Violet, aboard a yacht, is tossed onto the island occupied by Smith. Sutton also comes ashore on a boat. Thirst for revenge seizes Smith and he attacks Sutton, who dies in the fight. Violet nurses Sutton back to health and sanity.

== Cast ==
- William Farnum - Larry Smith
- Jewel Carmen - Violet North
- G. Raymond Nye - Captain Sutton
- Lulu May Bower - Larry's Sister
- Cora Drew - Larry's Mother
- Marc Robbins - Logan
- A. Burt Wesner - Lewis

unbilled

- Horace B. Carpenter
- Frank Ellis
- Bill Patton

== See also ==
- 1937 Fox vault fire
