= Silver Threads Among the Gold (1911 film) =

1911 film by Edwin S. Porter

Silver Threads Among the Gold is a 1911 film directed by Edwin S. Porter and adapted by Porter from a story by Pierce Kingsley. It is among the first early silent films about a song, where exhibitors would hire live musicians to accompany the film. The film centers on a performance of the popular song "Silver Threads Among the Gold".

== Cast ==
- Mabel Trunnelle
- Robert Brower
- William Bechtel
