= The Profiteer (1919 film) =

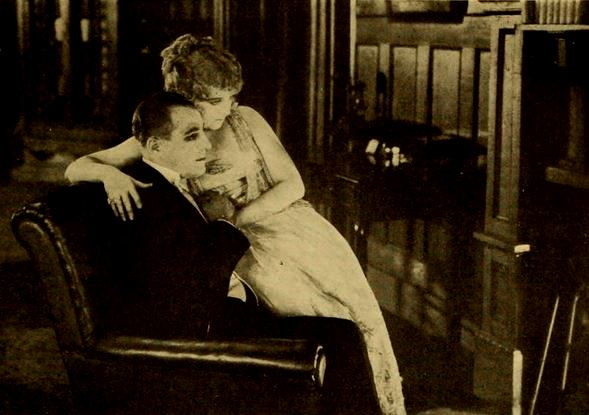
- Directed by: John K. Holbrook
- Starring: Jack Sherrill; Alma Hanlon; Robin H. Townley
- Edited by: Jesse J. Goldburg
- Production company: Arrow Film Corporation
- Distributed by: Arrow Film Corporation
- Release date: January 6, 1919
- Running time: 60 minutes
- Country: United States
- Languages: Silent; English intertitles

The Profiteer is a 1919 American silent war drama film directed by John K. Holbrook and starring Jack Sherrill, Alma Hanlon and Robin H. Townley.

== Cast ==
- Jack Sherrill as Tom Merritt
- Alma Hanlon
- Robin H. Townley
- Charles Bowell
- F.W. Stewart
- Dorothy Kingdon
- E.L. Howard
- Louise Hotaling

== Bibliography ==
- Robert B. Connelly. The Silents: Silent Feature Films, 1910-36, Volume 40, Issue 2. December Press, 1998.
