= Madame Sherry =

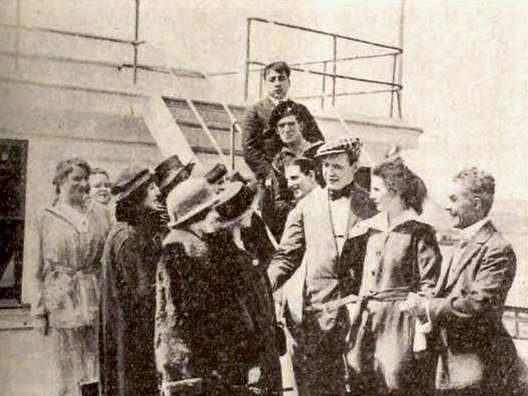
- Directed by: Ralph Dean
- Written by: Otto A. Harbach (play)
- Starring: Gertrude McCoy; Frank O'Connor; Jean Stuart
- Cinematography: David W. Gobbett
- Production company: Authors' Film Company
- Distributed by: M.H. Hoffman Distribution
- Release date: September 1, 1917
- Running time: 50 minutes
- Country: United States
- Languages: Silent; English intertitles

Madame Sherry is a 1917 American silent comedy film directed by Ralph Dean and starring Gertrude McCoy, Frank O'Connor and Jean Stuart. It is based on the 1910 musical play of the same title.

== Cast ==
- Gertrude McCoy as Yvonne Sherry
- Frank O'Connor as Edward Sherry
- H.J. Quealy as Theophilus Sherry
- Jean Stuart as Pepita
- Alphie James as Catherine Al
- Lucy Carter as Lulu
- Jack Mundy as Phillippe

== Bibliography ==
- Goble, Alan. The Complete Index to Literary Sources in Film. Walter de Gruyter, 1999.
