= Bigelow Cooper =

American actor

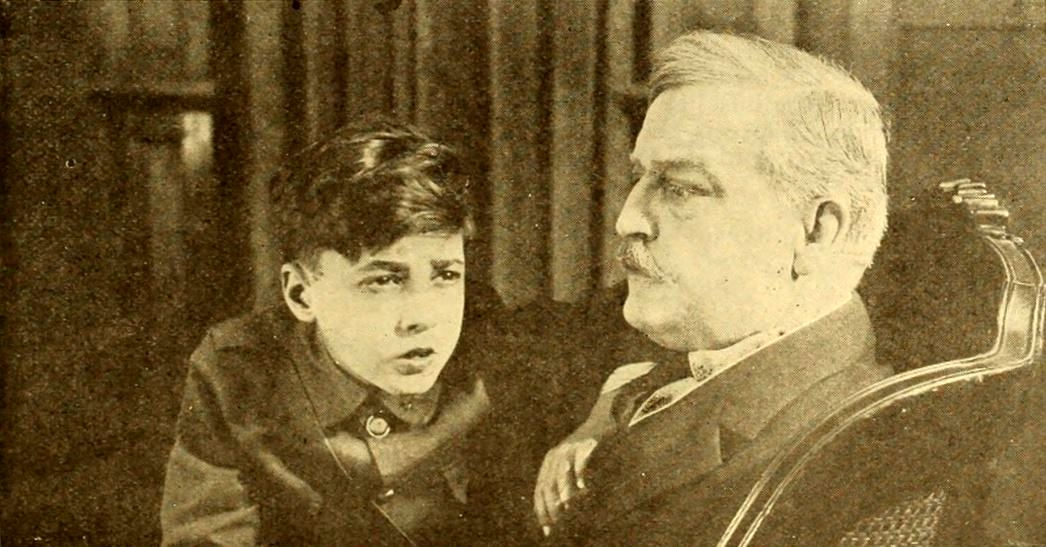
- Freddie Verdi and Cooper in Satan on Earth (1919)
- Born: Jackson Bigelow Cooper; December 21, 1867; Springfield, Ohio
- Died: 1953 (aged 85–86); Westchester County, New York, US
- Occupation: Actor
- Years active: 1904–1927

Jackson Bigelow Cooper (December 21, 1867 – 1953) was an American stage and screen character actor prominent in the silent film era.

== Biography ==
Born in Springfield, Ohio in 1867, Cooper's early acting experience came in stock theater, including acting with the first stock company at the Murray Hill Theater in New York City.

He began in films in 1911 and worked for such companies as Edison and Vitagraph.

In 1915 Cooper and a friend were nearly killed in a road accident when their car overturned trapping them underneath. They were evidently not seriously hurt.

== Selected filmography ==
- What Happened to Mary (1912)
- Helping John (1912)
- The Land Beyond the Sunset (1912)
- On the Broad Stairway (1914)
- Vanity Fair (1915)
- Eugene Aram (1915)
- When Love Is King (1916)
- The Heart of the Hills (1916)
- Where Love Is (1917)
- The Light in Darkness (1917)
- The Tell-Tale Step (1917)
- The Bottom of the Well (1917)
- Revelation (1918)
- Wild Primrose (1918)
- The Make-Believe Wife (1918)
- The Test of Honor (1919)
- The Country Cousin (1919)
- Shadows of Suspicion (1919)
- The Prophet's Paradise (1922)
- The Exciters (1923)
- Another Scandal (1924)
- Bad Company (1925)
- White Mice (1926)
- The Broadway Drifter (1927)
