= A Pair of Sixes (film) =

1918 film

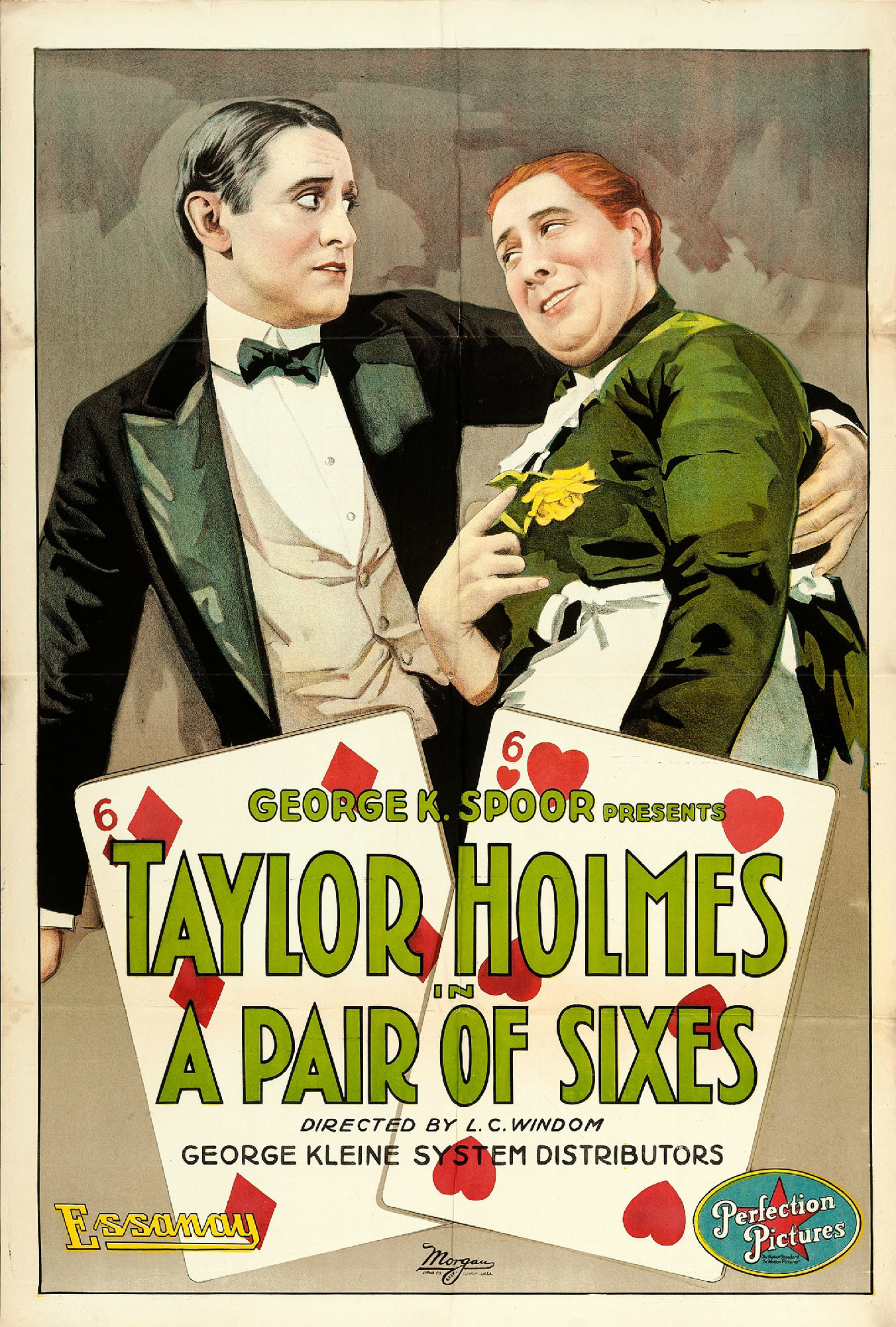
- Directed by: Lawrence C. Windom
- Written by: Charles J. McGuirk
- Based on: A Pair of Sixes by Edward Peple
- Produced by: George K. Spoor
- Starring: Taylor Holmes; Robert Conness; Alice Mann
- Cinematography: Arthur Reeves
- Production companies: Perfection Pictures; Essanay Studios
- Distributed by: George Kleine System
- Release date: April 1, 1918
- Running time: 60 minutes
- Country: United States
- Languages: Silent; English intertitles

A Pair of Sixes is a 1918 American silent comedy film directed by Lawrence C. Windom and starring Taylor Holmes, Robert Conness and Alice Mann.

== Cast ==
- Taylor Holmes as T. Boggs Johns
- Robert Conness as George B. Nettleton
- Alice Mann as Florence Cole
- Edna Phillips as Mrs. Nettleton
- Cecil Owen as Thomas J. Vanderholt
- Maude Eburne as Coddles
- C.E. Ashley as Krone
- John Cossar as Applegate
- Byron Aldenn as Tony Toler
- Virginia Bowker as Sally Parker
- Tommy Carey as Jimmie

== Bibliography ==
- Connelly, Robert B. The Silents: Silent Feature Films, 1910-36, Volume 40, Issue 2. December Press, 1998.
