= Richard Ridgely =

American actor

- Born: September 16, 1889; Cynthiana, Kentucky, United States
- Died: November 30, 1949 (aged 60); Long Island, New York, United States
- Occupations: Actor, director
- Years active: 1911–1917 (film)

Richard Ridgely (1869–1949) was an American actor and film director active during the silent era.

== Selected filmography ==
- Ranson's Folly (1915)
- Eugene Aram (1915)
- Olive's Greatest Opportunity (1915)
- The Martyrdom of Philip Strong (1916)
- The Heart of the Hills (1916)
- Pride (1917)

== Bibliography ==
- Leonhard Gmür. Rex Ingram: Hollywood's Rebel of the Silver Screen. 2013.
