= The Invisible Ray (1920 serial) =

1920 film

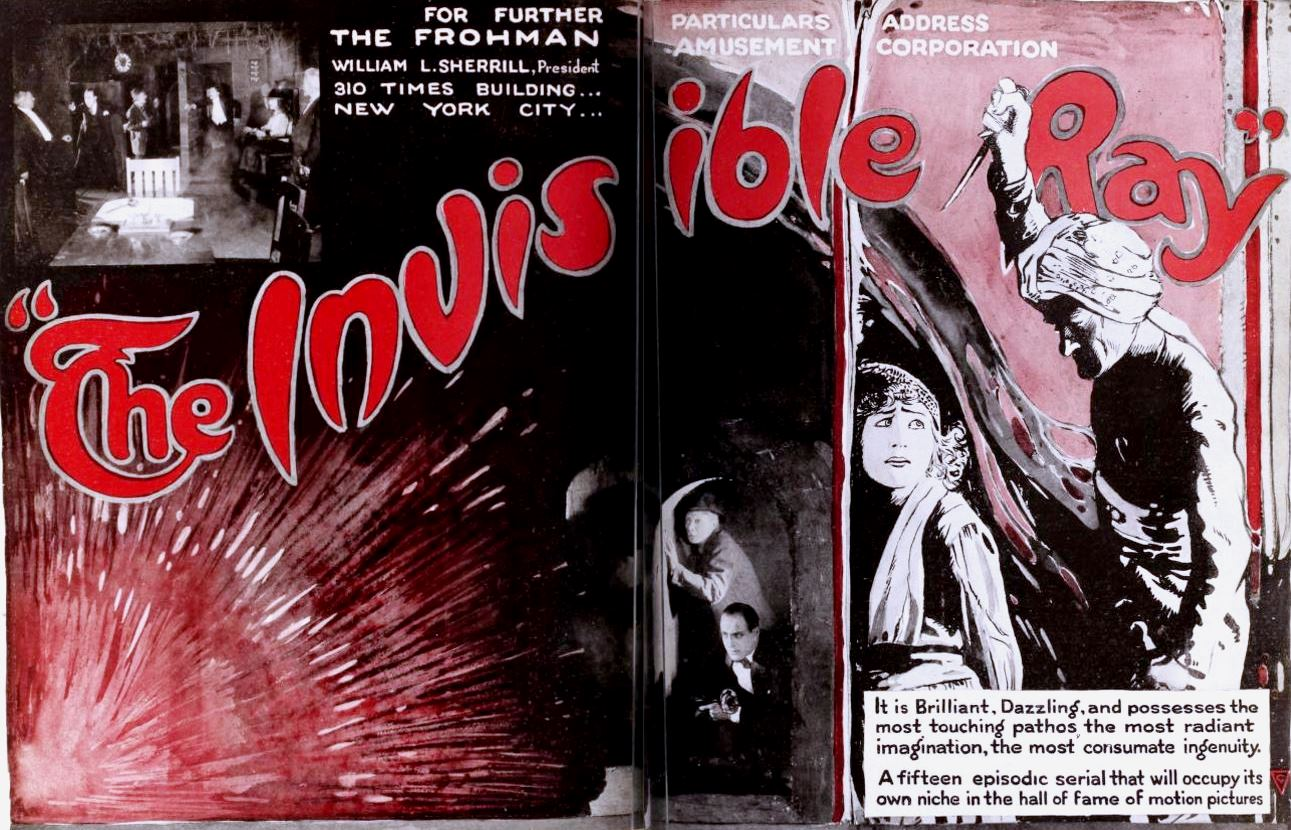
- Advertisement for film serial
- Directed by: Harry A. Pollard
- Written by: Guy McConnell
- Starring: Ruth Clifford; Jack Sherrill
- Production company: Frohman Amusement Company
- Distributed by: Joan Film Sales
- Release date: July 1, 1920
- Running time: 15 episodes
- Country: United States
- Language: Silent (English intertitles)

The Invisible Ray is a 1920 American science fiction film serial directed by Harry A. Pollard.

Early press accounts cited the "scientific foundation of the plot. In this respect the production differs from other serials. Fact and not fancy governs the action throughout. The plot is based on a scientific investigation made by the author of the serial, Guy McConnell, investigation for several research institutions and for the Chemical Division of the United States Department of the Interior."

The film was also lauded for its special effects. According to a report in The Moving Picture World, "Mighty buildings, rocks and forests are set afire and exploded. The expert application of clever photographic devices makes the picture appear strikingly realistic." The serial is now considered to be lost.

== Plot ==
After a mineralogist discovers a ray with extraordinary powers, a group of scientists seek to use it for a criminal scheme. The serial begins, as described in a film magazine, with the two keys to a box that contains the source of the rays which, if concentrated, are powerful enough to destroy the world. One of the keys is hung around the neck of Mystery (Clifford), a foundling girl who is the daughter of the mineralogist. The second key and the box are in unknown hands at the beginning of the serial. Jack Stone (Sherrill) loves her, but on the night of their planned elopement Mystery is kidnapped for the key she wears, which falls at the door of the minister. She is taken to an underground chamber where she is tortured in an attempt to force her to give up her key. Jack and a friend visit a Crystal Gazer who reveals the whereabouts of Mystery. In a thrilling chase through underground chambers the young woman is rescued, only then to fall back into the hands of her enemies. Mystery is swung from a derrick and falls into the water. Later serial chapters reveal Marianna, the Crystal Gazer (Uzzell), as the mother of Mystery, and her father turns out to be her pursuer, attempting to gain possession of the box and its key.

== Cast ==
- Ruth Clifford as Mystery
- Jack Sherrill as Jack Stone
- Sidney Bracey as Jean Deaux
- Edwards Davis as John Haldane (credited as Ed Davis)
- Corene Uzzell as Marianna, Crystal Gazer
- William H. Tooker as Gang member

== See also ==
- List of film serials
- List of film serials by studio
- List of lost films
