= Ranson's Folly (1915 film) =

1915 film

- Directed by: Richard Ridgely
- Written by: Richard Harding Davis (novel, play: Ranson's Folly)
- Produced by: Thomas A. Edison, Inc.
- Distributed by: General Film Company
- Release date: September 17, 1915
- Running time: 4 reels
- Country: United States
- Languages: Silent; English intertitles

Ranson's Folly is a lost 1915 silent feature western produced by Thomas A. Edison, Inc. Based on the Richard Harding Davis novel and Broadway play, this film is the second version of the story. An earlier short had been made in 1910. A later film appeared in 1926 Ranson's Folly.

== Cast ==
- Marc McDermott - Patrick Cahill
- Mabel Trunnelle - Mary Cahill
- Marjorie Ellison - A Dope Fiend
- Edward Earle - Lieutenant Ranson
- Joseph Bingham - Rev. John Spaulding
- Gladys Leslie - Miss Perry
- Jessie Stevens - Miss Violet Pebble
- James Harris - Sergeant Clancey
- George A. Wright - Major Caswell
