= Jack Sherrill =

American actor

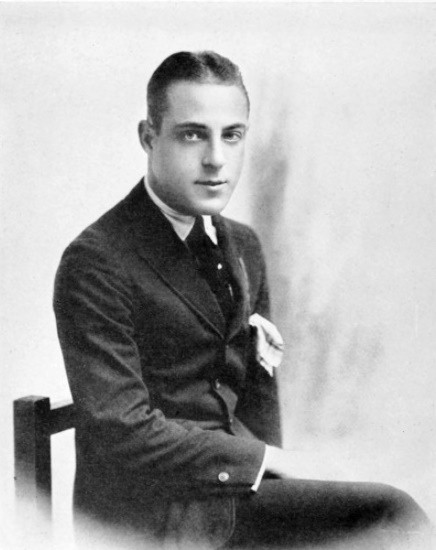
- Jack Sherrill c. 1920
- Born: April 14, 1898; Atlanta, Georgia, United States
- Died: November 26, 1973 (aged 75); Honolulu, Hawaii, United States
- Occupation: Actor
- Years active: 1915–1921 (film)

Jack Sherrill (April 14, 1898 – November 26, 1973) was an American film actor of the silent era. He was one of the leading players for the Frohman Amusement Company.

== Selected filmography ==
- The Conquest of Canaan (1916)
- The Woman in 47 (1916)
- Then I'll Come Back to You (1916)
- The Accomplice (1917)
- God's Man (1917)
- The Silent Witness (1917)
- The Rainbow (1917)
- The Profiteer (1919)
- The Invisible Ray (1920)

== Bibliography ==
- Goble, Alan. The Complete Index to Literary Sources in Film. Walter de Gruyter, 1999.
- Graham, Cooper C. & Irmscher, Christoph. Love and Loss in Hollywood: Florence Deshon, Max Eastman, and Charlie Chaplin. Indiana University Press, 2021.
- Fox, Charles Donald & Silver, Milton L. Who's Who on the Screen. Ross Publishing Company, 1920.
