= Mabel Trunnelle =

American actress

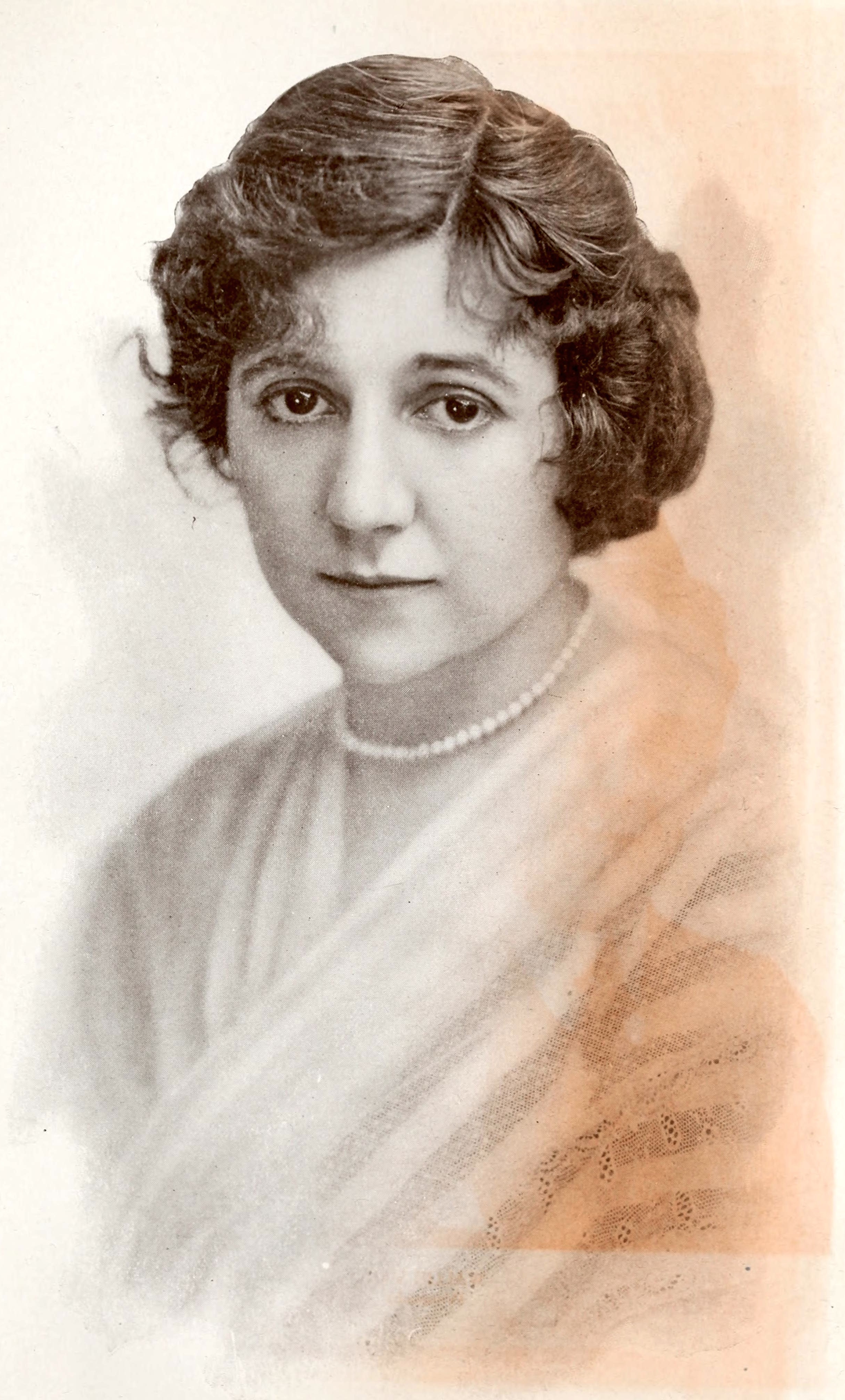
- Motion Picture Story Magazine, 1914
- Born: November 8, 1879; Dwight, Illinois, U.S.
- Died: April 20, 1981 (aged 101); Glendale, California, U.S.
- Occupation: Actress
- Spouse: Herbert Prior

Mabel Trunnelle (November 8, 1879 – April 20, 1981) was an American actress who appeared in 194 films between 1908 and 1923.

== Biography ==
Trunnelle was born in Dwight, Illinois, and died in Glendale, California.

Photoplay magazine argued that she was the merry-serious girl whose expressive eyes and face mirror emotions more effectively than a hundred voices. She was educated upon the stage for the five years she had spent in films, mostly before Edison cameras. Miss Trunnelle was a modest, cheerful, winsome young American wife whose husband was Herbert Prior.

She was a prominent star in early silent films of Edison Films, and frequently co-starred with Prior.

== Selected filmography ==
- A Woman's Way (1908) *short
- Nursing a Viper (1909) *short
- Silver Threads Among the Gold (1911) *short
- The Lighthouse by the Sea (1911) *short
- Ranson's Folly (1915)
- Eugene Aram (1915)
- The Heart of the Hills (1916)
- Where Love Is (1917)
- The Grell Mystery (1917)
- Singed Wings (1922)
- The Love Trap (1923)
