= Edward Peple =

American dramatist (1869–1924)

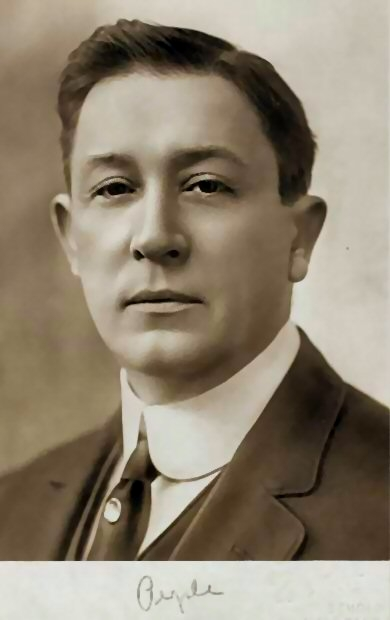
- Born: Edward Henry Peple; August 10, 1869; Richmond, Virginia, U.S.
- Died: July 28, 1924 (aged 54); New York City, U.S.
- Resting place: Hollywood Cemetery; Richmond, Virginia, U.S.
- Occupation: Playwright

Edward Henry Peple (August 10, 1869 – July 28, 1924) was an American playwright known for his comedies and farces. He was perhaps best remembered for the plays The Prince Chap, The Littlest Rebel and A Pair of Sixes.

== Biography ==
Born in Richmond, Virginia, Peple was educated John S. McGuire's academy in Richmond. He trained and worked as a lawyer, mainly with the American Bridge Company until 1912. In 1895, he moved to New Jersey. His first play was A Broken Rose. His play The Prince Chain opened in 1895 and ran for two seasons with Cyril Scott playing the lead.

Peple died on the morning of July 28, 1924, at his residence in the Hotel Royalton after suffering a heart attack the evening before. He was buried in Hollywood Cemetery in Richmond.

== Works ==
Plays

- A Broken Rosary
- The Prince Chap, New York : S. French 1904
- The Love Route
- The Silver Girl
- Semiramis, 1907
- The Littlest Rebel New York : S. French 1911
- A Pair of Sixes, 1914

Books

- A Night Out, 1909
- The Littlest Rebel New York, Moffat, Yard 1911
