= Rebecca of Sunnybrook Farm (disambiguation) =

Rebecca of Sunnybrook Farm is a classic American children's novel by Kate Douglas Wiggin.

Rebecca of Sunnybrook Farm may also refer to:

- Rebecca of Sunnybrook Farm (play), a 1909 American play based on the novel
- Rebecca of Sunnybrook Farm (1917 film), a silent comedy-drama film directed by Marshall Neilan
- Rebecca of Sunnybrook Farm (1932 film), a 1932 film directed by Alfred Santell
- Rebecca of Sunnybrook Farm (1938 film), a 1938 musical film directed by Allan Dwan and starring Shirley Temple
- Rebecca of Sunnybrook Farm (TV series), a 1978 British TV series
