= Rebecca of Sunnybrook Farm (play) =

Play by Kate Douglas Wiggin and Charlotte Thompson

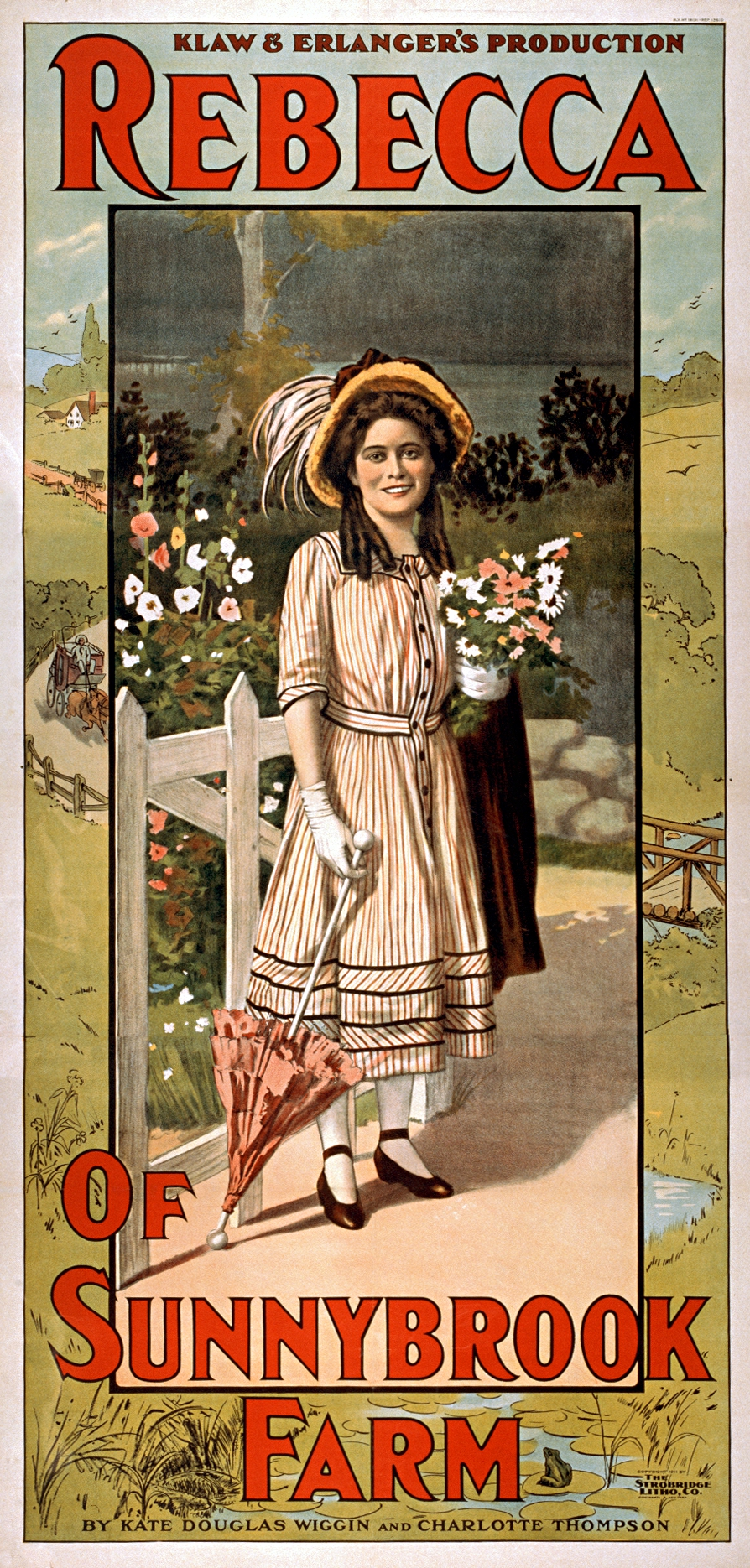
- Poster for the play
- Original language: English
- Written by: Kate Douglas Wiggin and Charlotte Thompson
- Genre: Comedy

Premiere
- Date: November 15, 1909
- Place: Court Square Theatre, Springfield, Massachusetts

Rebecca of Sunnybrook Farm is a play written by Kate Douglas Wiggin and Charlotte Thompson. It is an adaptation of Wiggin's novels about the character Rebecca Rowena Randall, including elements from the 1903 novel of the same name and the 1907 follow-up, New Chronicles of Rebecca. Producers Klaw and Erlanger debuted it at the Court Square Theatre in Springfield, Massachusetts on November 15, 1909. After touring New England for a season, it appeared on Broadway, opening at the Republic Theatre on October 3, 1910. The play received positive reviews and was used as the basis for subsequent movie adaptations.

== Plot ==
Orphan Rebecca Rowena Randall is sent to live with her dour aunts, Jane and Miranda Sawyer. She has trouble adjusting to her new home at first, and tries to run away. Eventually her light-hearted optimism wins over her aunts and attracts the interest of local boy Adam Ladd.

== History ==
Author Kate Douglas Wiggin's bestselling children's novel Rebecca of Sunnybrook Farm was first published in 1903. A sequel, New Chronicles of Rebecca, was published in 1907. In the summer of that year, Wiggin was approached by fellow author Charlotte Thompson about adapting the Rebecca stories for the stage. Wiggin was skeptical about the suggestion, but Thompson had previous experiencing adapting novels into plays, so Wiggin agreed to collaborate with her. The resulting adaptation used material from both novels. In the spring of 1908, they submitted the script to the production team of Marc Klaw and A. L. Erlanger, who accepted it and began work on the production that debuted in November 1909.

The first production of the play appeared at the Court Square Theatre in Springfield, Massachusetts, where it debuted on November 15, 1909. After it toured in New England during the 1909–10 season, Klaw and Erlanger took the pay to the Republic Theatre on Broadway for the 1910–11 season. It opened there on October 3, 1910, and continued for 216 performances. The production closed on April 8, 1911.

== Cast and characters ==
The characters and cast from the Broadway production are given below:

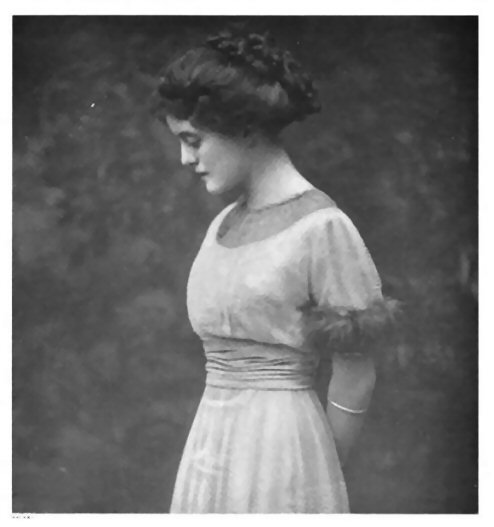
Edith Taliaferro played Rebecca in the Broadway production.

Cast of the Broadway production
Character	Broadway cast
Rebecca Rowena Randall	Edith Taliaferro
Jeremiah Cobb	Archie Boyd
Alice Robinson	Etta Bryan
Minnie Smellie	Kathryn Bryan
Abner Simpson	Samuel Coit
Miranda Sawyer	Marie L. Day
Mrs. Perkins	Ada Deaves
Mrs. Simpson	Viola Fortescue
Emma Jane Perkins	Lorraine Frost
Jane Sawyer	Eliza Glassford
Adam Ladd	Ralph Kellard
Clara Belle Simpson	Violet Mersereau
Abijah Flagg	Ernest Truex

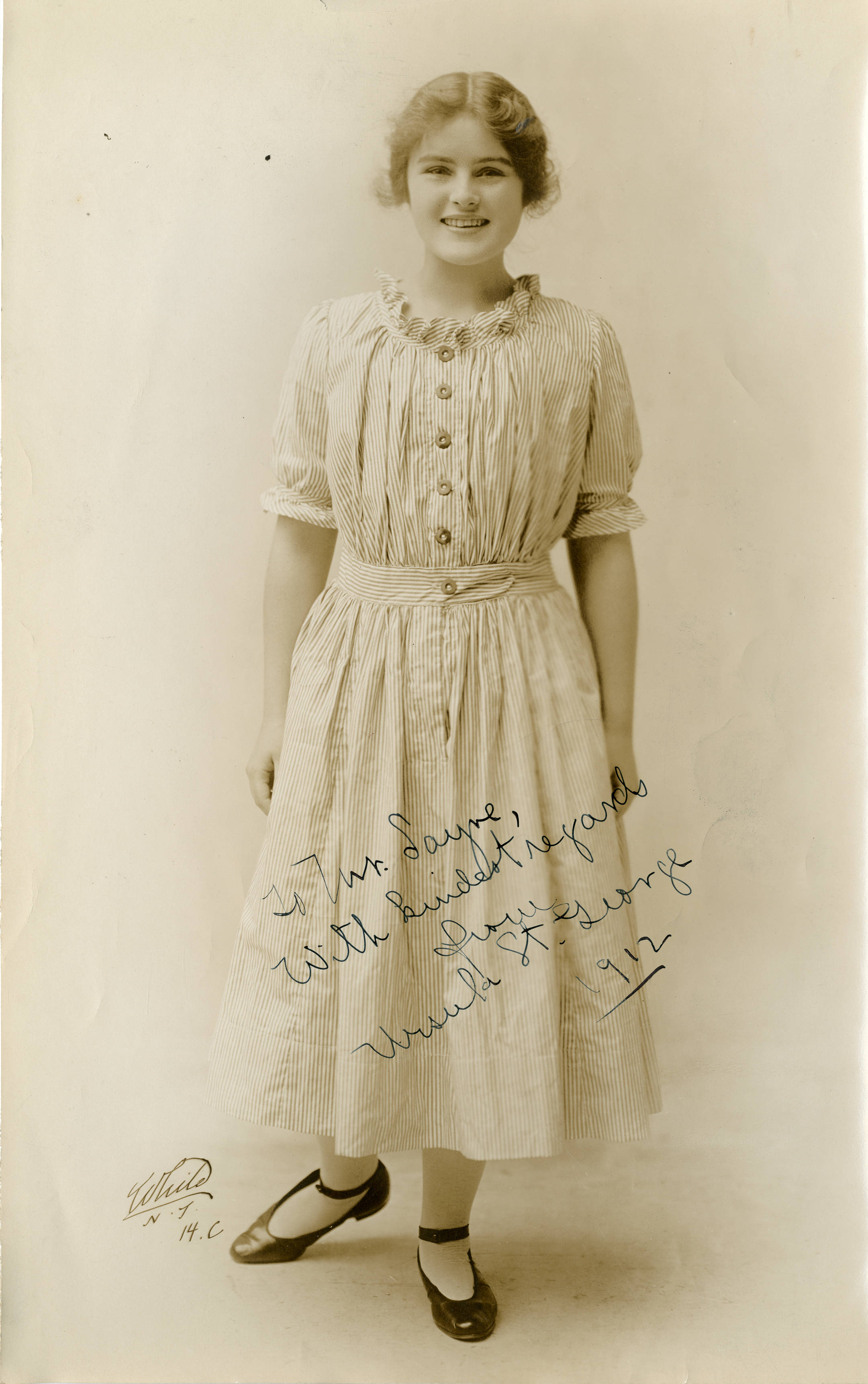
Ursula St. George played Rebecca in the Klaw & Erlanger touring company, 1911–1912.

== Reception ==
The play received positive reviews. The New York Times praised the story and acting, saying the play was enjoyable for adults and even better for children. The Theatre praised the acting and the lighthearted tone of play. The New-York Tribune called it "a constant delight from beginning to end".

== Adaptations ==
The play served as the basis for several movie adaptations, all using the title Rebecca of Sunnybrook Farm. A 1917 silent film adaptation starred Mary Pickford as Rebecca and was directed by Marshall Neilan. The first sound adaptation in 1932 starred Marian Nixon and was directed by Alfred Santell. A musical film adaptation in 1938 starred Shirley Temple and was directed by Allan Dwan.
