= Mother Carey's Chickens =

Mother Carey's Chickens may refer to:

- Mother Carey's chickens, an alternative name for storm petrels
- Mother Carey's Chickens (novel), a 1911 novel by Kate Douglas Wiggin
- Mother Carey's Chickens (film), a 1938 drama film adaptation of the novel

== See also ==
- Mother Carey, personification of a cruel sea in folklore
- Mother Carey's goose, an alternative name for a giant petrel
- Mother Carey's Chicken, an 1888 novel by George Manville Fenn
