= A Bit o' Heaven =

1917 American drama film

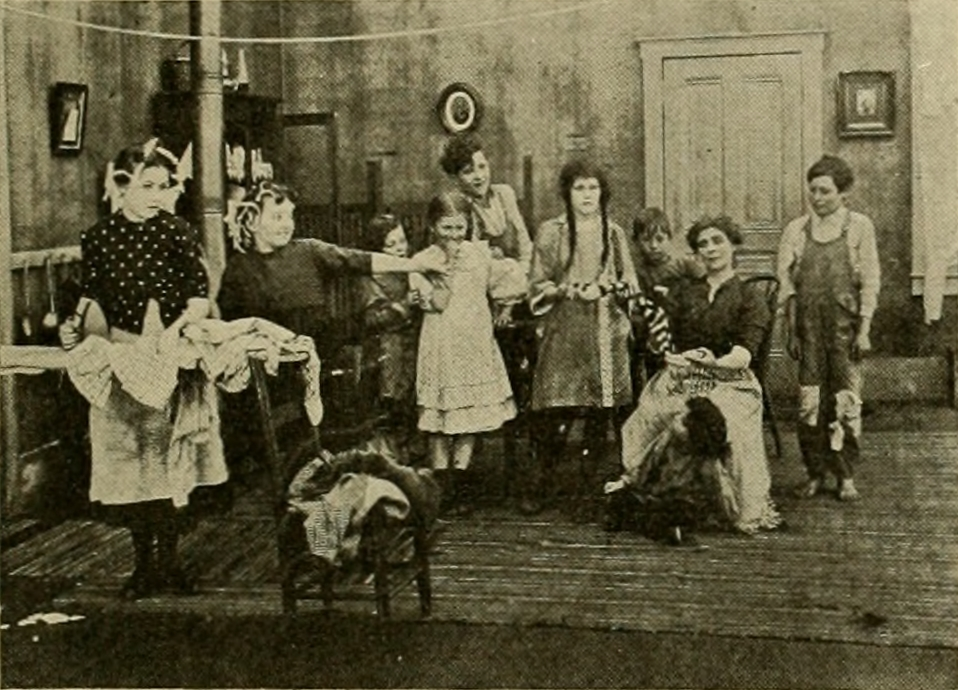
- A still from A Bit o' Heaven
- Directed by: Lule Warrenton
- Written by: Kate Douglas Wiggin
- Produced by: Lule Warrenton
- Starring: Mary Louise
- Cinematography: Gilbert Warrenton
- Distributed by: Frieder Film Corporation
- Release date: 1917
- Country: United States
- Language: English

A Bit o' Heaven is a 1917 American drama film directed by Lule Warrenton. The now-lost film was distributed by the Frieder Film Corporation in Chicago, whose California branch was headed by Warrenton. The film was based on the 1888 novel The Birds' Christmas Carol by the writer Kate Douglas Wiggin.

== Plot ==
A Bit o' Heaven reproduces the plot of the original novel without deviations.

Five-year-old Carol is the severely disabled child of wealthy parents. Their contacts are limited to their father, mother, the two brothers, their carer Elfrida, Uncle Jack, who is now traveling to distant countries, and the Ruggles' nine children who live in the back house. Occasional letters from Uncle Jack with a little surprise and the irregular visits from one of the Ruggles children are the only diversions in their monotonous life. Despite this, Carol is happy and loved by everyone.

Shortly before Christmas, Carol has the idea to invite the Ruggles children to the party. Her mother agrees, and so Carol writes a letter of invitation to Mrs. Ruggles, which is delivered to her by her eldest daughter Sarah Maude. Uncle Jack announces himself with a letter and asks if he can visit the Birds for the festival.

On Christmas morning, Mrs. Ruggles laments that her late husband will miss seeing their children "introduced into society." She borrows a pair of socks from a neighbor for Peary, who protestingly has to give half of her candy to the neighbor's son. Sarah Maude has to wash, comb and dress her siblings like never before. Mrs. Ruggles makes new clothes for Larry and she washes and mends Clem's "other shirt." Kitty's curls are de-matted and at the end of the hard day's work she looks proudly at her work: "I've never seen such a neat bunch of children in my entire life." Finally, the question arises as to what the children will wear on the way to the celebration. After some checking, it becomes clear that there are not enough hats for everyone. Sarah Maude is instructed to explain that they left their hats at home because of the nice weather and the short distance. However, Sarah messes everything up. Clem doesn't make it any easier by stating that it was nice not having enough hats for everyone.

At the Christmas table, Uncle Jack sits at the end of the table and Carol is wheeled into the dining room with her bed. After the celebration, the neighbors leave the Birds laden with gifts. When they are gone, Carol suffers a seizure and, dying, whispers to her mother that they celebrated Christ's birthday this year the way she would have wanted.

== Background ==
A Bit o' Heaven was distributed on five reels. The film is one of Warrenton's first directing works, who also produced the film and had previously appeared as an actress in more than 80 films. Warrenton had just separated from Universal Studios, where she had worked since 1912. After the short-lived Warrenton Children's Photoplay Company in Lankershim (now North Hollywood), she founded a branch of the Chicago, Illinois-based Frieder Film Company in the same location. The president of the Frieder Film Company, based in Chicago, Illinois, was Irene M. Frieder, and the general manager in California was Lule Warrenton. A Bit o' Heaven was Warrenton's first film distributed by the Frieder Film Company and one of its first to feature contemporary child stars. Warrenton soon had the reputation that no one was better than her when it came to working with children.

== Reception ==
The Moving Picture World called A Bit o' Heaven "a delightful diversion from the present run" of films being shown at the time. "Its cleanly humor, spontaneous and natural, and its steady appeal to the best and cleanest of human instincts is decidedly refreshing.”
