= Salmon Falls (West) Historic District =

Historic district in Maine, United States

- U.S. National Register of Historic Places
- U.S. Historic district
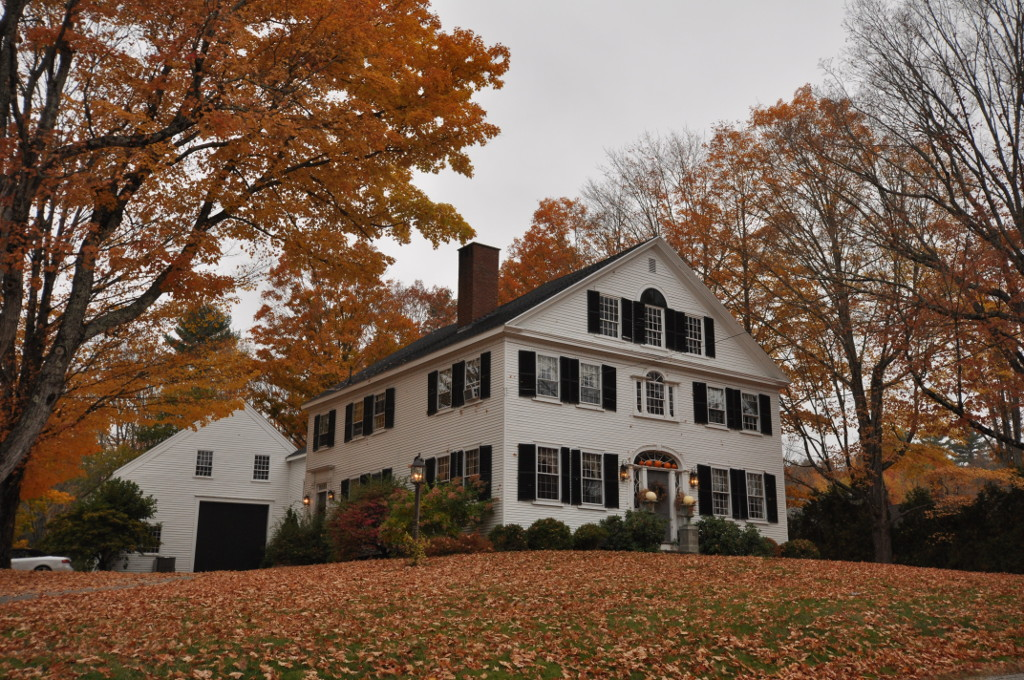

- Location within Maine Location within the United States
- Location: Salmon Falls Rd., Hollis, Maine
- Coordinates: 43°35′53″N 70°33′24″W
- Area: 13 acres (5.3 ha)
- Built: 1794
- Architectural style: Greek Revival, Federal
- NRHP reference No.: 87001858
- Added to NRHP: October 30, 1987

The Salmon Falls (West) Historic District encompasses a cluster of well-preserved buildings built before 1840, and located on the Hollis, Maine side of the rural village of Salmon Falls. In addition to its architectural significance, the area is also noted for its association with the author Kate Douglas Wiggin, whose home, Quillcote, is in the district, as is the Salmon Falls Library, established by her efforts in 1911. The district was listed on the National Register of Historic Places in 1987.

== Description and history ==
The Salmon Falls area, divided between Buxton and Hollis by the Saco River, developed beginning in the late 18th century as a modest agricultural area, and the falls on the river, for which it is named, were developed in the second quarter of the 19th century with small scale industrial operations. The road that is now Maine State Route 117 was the main road in the area leading north from the port of Saco, and became the focus for development on the Buxton side of the village. One of the first settlers on the west side of the river, Isaac Lane, paid to have a bridge built across the river (roughly now the location of United States Route 202) c. 1794. The area saw growth in the second quarter of the 19th century, but declined economically thereafter, limiting further development.

The historic district covers about 13 acres (5.3 ha), and extends along Salmon Falls Road north from its junction with US 202, including only the Salmon Falls Library on the south side of that road. The oldest houses in the district are those of Isaac Lane and Jabez Bradbury, both built in the 1790s. The former is a well-preserved Federal style wood-frame house, while the latter, now also known as the Kate Douglas Wiggin House or "Quillcote", has been significantly altered with the addition of a Greek Revival ell. Most of the remaining houses are 1-1/2 or 2 1/2-story wood-frame houses built in the 1820s, with Greek Revival styling. There is one brick house, the Moses Dunn House, built in the 1830s, which occupies a picturesque site overlooking the Saco River. The Salmon Falls Library is located in the district's only surviving non-residential building, built as a shop in the 1820s, and converted into a kindergarten and library by Kate Douglas Wiggin and her sister Nora Smith in 1911.

Kate Douglas Wiggin was a noted writer of children's books. First exposed to the Salmon Falls area as a child, she purchased the Jabez Bradbury House in 1905 (it was the ancestral home of her stepfather), which became her home for the rest of her life. The library she and her sister founded was given to the town upon their deaths.

Two of the ten buildings in the district are non-contributing, and both stand between Quillcote and the Isaac Lane House. One was built in the 1950s, while the house nearer to Quillcote was built in the 1970s.

== See also ==
- Salmon Falls (East) Historic District, across the Saco River in Buxton
- National Register of Historic Places listings in York County, Maine
