= Round House (Los Angeles) =

Coordinates: 34.0496566°N 118.2461499°W

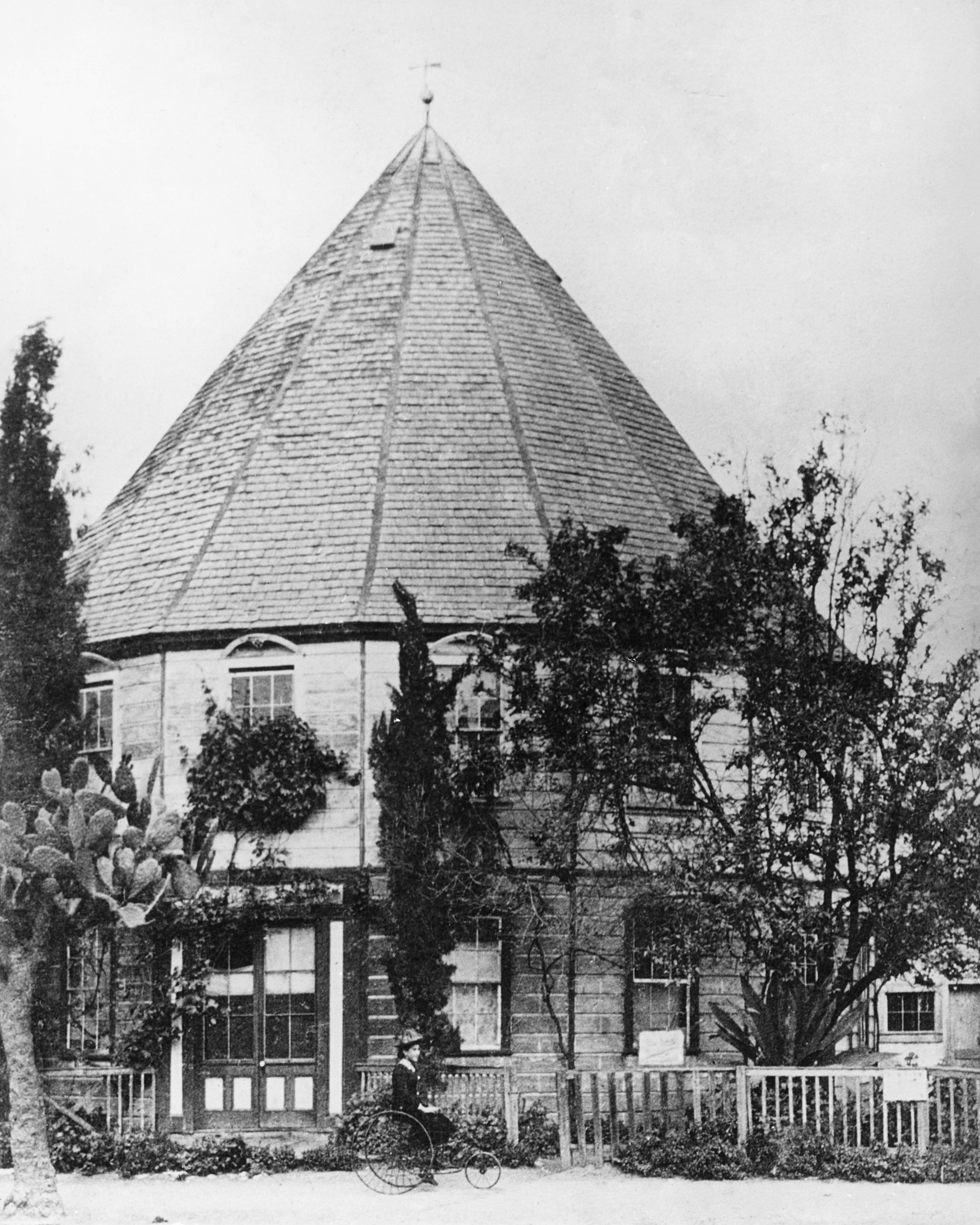
Round House circa 1880-1885

Round House (later, Garden of Paradise) was a landmark building on the west side of Main Street, below Third in downtown Los Angeles, California.

== History ==
The land comprising several lots situated on Main Street below Third Street was granted on August 31, 1847, by the Ayuntamiento of the pueblo of Los Angeles, to Juan Bouvette and Loreta Cota, his wife. On March 3, 1854, it was purchased by Remundo Alexander and Maria Valdez, his wife. Alexander was a native of France, and came to California as a sailor. In Africa, he had seen houses of stone built in cylindrical form. When he got married, this prompted him to vary the uniform style of building in Spanish-American countries by fashioning the adobe dwelling for his bride after the architecture of Africa. For a time they lived in the house.

On July 28, 1856, it was sold to George Lehman and his wife, Clara Snyder. Lehman was a native of Germany, familiarly known to his fellow-citizens as "Dutch George" or "Round House George". He was described as a good-natured, kind-hearted, well-meaning man, full of vagaries and fantastic notions. Lehman had a strange hallucination that he had found the Garden of Eden, and he set to work to make his grounds as nearly as possible his conception of the dwelling place of Adam and Eve. He fitted up the grounds for a pleasure resort, and the building for a saloon. The grounds were referred to then as the Garden of Eden and Lehman named the resort the Garden of Paradise. The public garden was frequented especially on Sundays. This garden became a thicket of foliage and bloom to which Lehman charged a small admission fee; and he sold beer and pretzels in the shade. A music band was stationed on the balcony of the Round House and played at intervals.

For more than twenty years, this garden was one of the resorts of the town, and was used on public occasions, notably the country's centennial celebration of July 4, 1876. Lehman contracted debts he could not pay and on March 6, 1879, it passed out of his possession, sold under foreclosure of mortgage. The cactus hedge was cut down in July, 1886, when the city ordered the laying of cement sidewalks. The building was used as a school house after Lehman left it. Founded by Emma Marwedel, it was home to Southern California’s first kindergarten, and its first teacher was Kate Douglas Wiggin. It was later a lodging house, and its last use was a dwelling for tramps. The Round House was torn down in 1889.

== Architecture ==
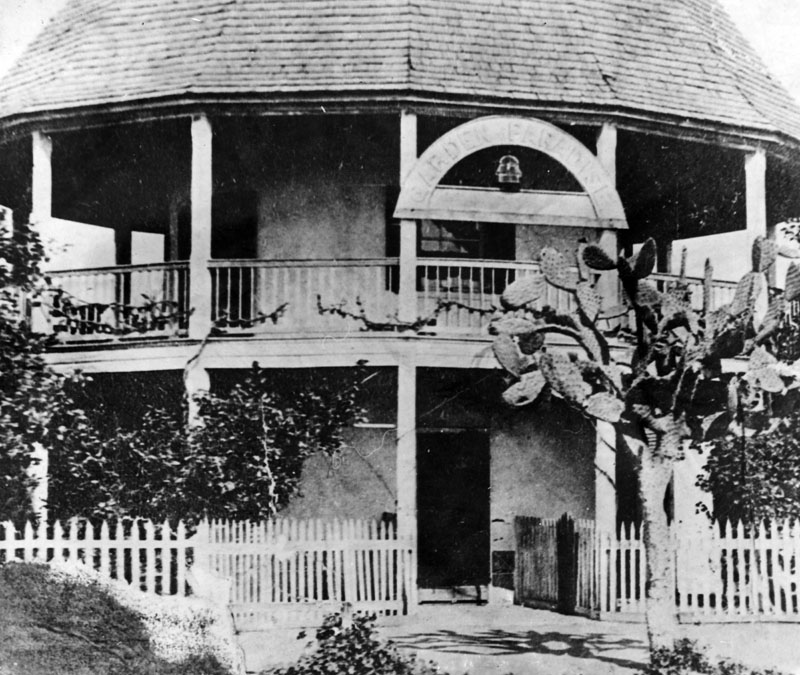
Main entrance

Alexander varied the uniform style of building in Spanish-American countries and fashioned the new adobe dwelling after the architecture of Africa. The building was two stories high, with an umbrella-shaped shingle roof. The walls were 1.5 feet (0.46 m) deep. Mrs. Alexander thought it cost, with the lawn, from US$15,000-$20,000. After Lehman came into possession of the Round House he enlarged it by enclosing it in a frame extension about 10 feet (3.0 m) deep, which on the exterior was an octagon, and in the interior divided into additional rooms. Over the windows, he painted the names of the thirteen original States, with that of California added.

== Grounds ==
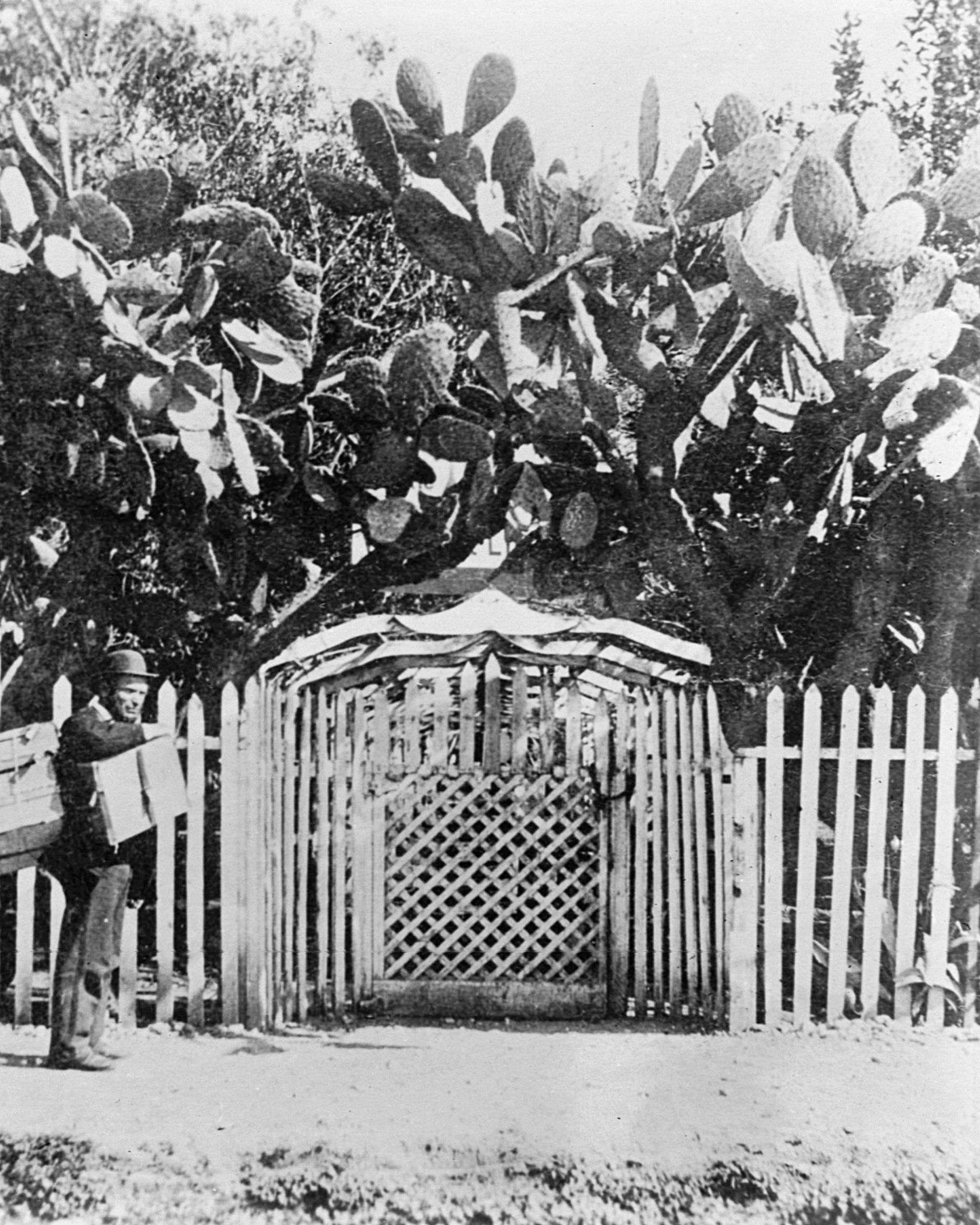
Entrance gate on Spring Street

The building stood on lots 311, 313, 315, and 317 fronting 120 feet (37 m) on Main Street and running through to Spring Street. Its exact location was 91.5 feet (27.9 m) south of Third Street. The Main Street front of the Garden was later occupied by the Pinney Block, the Pridham Block and Turnverein Hall. On the Spring Street front, lots 308, 310, 312, and 314, was a thick cactus hedge which barred entrance to the grounds from that street. The entrance to the garden was guarded by a row of tunas (Prickly-pear cacti), which extended across the Main and Spring streets sides that grew from 10–15 feet (3.0–4.6 m) high. Lehman planted shade-giving pepper trees, and built a labyrinth of arbors, which in time were hidden under a profusion of vines and roses. He planted fruit and ornamental trees, shrubbery and plants. There were statues of Adam and Eve, Cain and Abel, a serpent and golden apples, as well as a frame work for flying horses for the amusement of children. Scattered about under the trees were effigies in cement of the animals which passed in review before Adam to receive their names.
