= Salmon Falls (East) Historic District =

Historic district in Maine, United States

- U.S. National Register of Historic Places
- U.S. Historic district
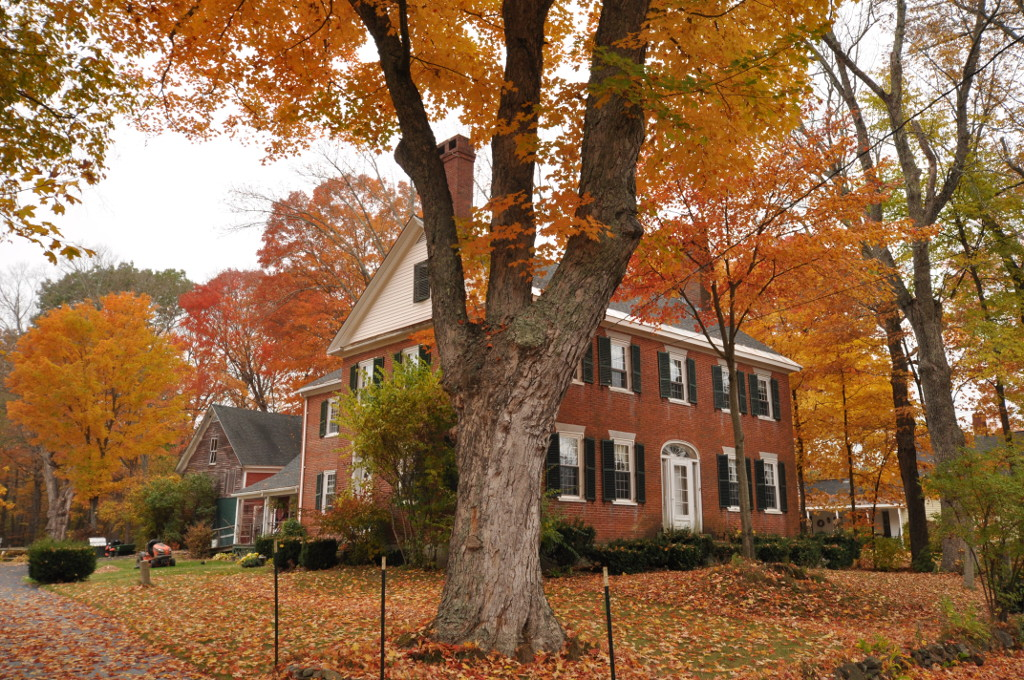

- Location within Maine Location within the United States
- Location: Portions of ME 117 and Simpson Rd., Buxton, Maine
- Coordinates: 43°35′34″N 70°33′4″W
- Area: 25 acres (10 ha)
- Architectural style: Greek Revival, Federal
- NRHP reference No.: 87001859
- Added to NRHP: October 15, 1987

The Salmon Falls (East) Historic District encompasses a node of rural development in western Buxton, Maine. It includes thirteen historic properties, mainly Greek Revival in character, extending north along Maine State Route 117, north of its junction with Simpson Road, and two on the latter street, that were all built between about 1800 and 1850. The district was listed on the National Register of Historic Places in 1987.

== Description and history ==
The Salmon Falls area, divided between Buxton and Hollis by the Saco River, developed beginning in the late 18th century as a modest agricultural area, and the falls on the river, for which it is named, were developed in the second quarter of the 19th century with small scale industrial operations. The road that is now Maine State Route 117 was the main road in the area leading north from the port of Saco, and became the focus for development on the Buxton side of the village. The area declined economically in the second half of the 19th century, and further growth was consequently quite limited.

The district is centered along a stretch of Route 117 extending south from a bend in the Saco River to the road's junction with Simpson and Elden Roads. Eleven properties line this piece of road, with another two on Simpson and Elden completing the district inventory. The oldest house, the Elden family homestead, stands on the south side of Elden Road, and is a fine Federal-style estimated to date to the 1790s. The Came-Marshall House, located just northwest of the junction, is probably the most impressive house in the district: it is a 2-1/2 story Federal-style brick structure, with an elaborate entry that has sidelight windows and a semi-circular fanlight. Most of the houses in the district, however, were built between 1825 and 1850, and are Greek Revival in character. Most are wood-frame structures 1-1/2 or 2-1/2 stories in height, although three are built out of brick. The latest building in the district is the c. 1868 Darrah Tavern, which anchors the district's northern end. Two buildings are non-contributing to the district. One, the Jabez Haley House, has been altered. It was built in 1862. The other house was moved to the corner of Elden Lane and Route 117 in 1936. The Hopkinson-Nichols House is a Cape Style house that was built c. 1800, but it was not a part of the neighborhood when the other houses were built.

== See also ==
- Salmon Falls (West) Historic District, across the Saco River in Hollis
- National Register of Historic Places listings in York County, Maine
