= Lule Warrenton =

American actress

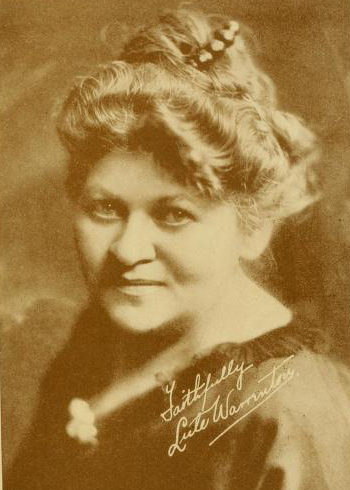
- Warrenton autographed photo, 1915
- Born: July 22, 1862; Flint, Michigan, U.S.
- Died: May 14, 1932 (aged 69); Laguna Beach, California, U.S.
- Occupation: Actress
- Years active: 1913-1922
- Children: Gilbert Warrenton

Lule Warrenton (June 22, 1862 – May 14, 1932) was an American actress, director, and producer during the silent film era. She appeared in more than 80 films between 1913 and 1922. She was born in Flint, Michigan and died in Laguna Beach, California and was the mother of cinematographer Gilbert Warrenton.

== Early life ==
Warrenton was born to a production manager father. Under the supervision of her uncle, Sheridan Corbyn, Warrenton had played child parts and had been and continued to be on stage and in motion pictures for most of her life.

Warrenton attended St. Rose's Convent and later studied at the University of Michigan. Following her time at Michigan, Warrenton began her stage career as an elocutionist at the University of Notre Dame. She later progressed into a Shakespearian reader, performing in her first show at Victoria Rifle's Armory in Montreal, Quebec, Canada.

== Actress ==
Warrenton appeared in a total of 81 films over the course of her career. Although she claimed a few lead roles, she generally played supporting roles more often. Warrenton more popularly appeared within the genres of comedy or westerns. She had the reputation of being a versatile actress and played an assortment of diverse roles, including as a black woman in The Queen of Jungleland and as a male Chinese Mandarin, complete with a mustache, under director Henry McRae.

In a review of one of her performances, the Pittsburgh Press said that "playing different parts, the more difficult the better, is the work and pastime of Lule Warrenton".

== Director ==
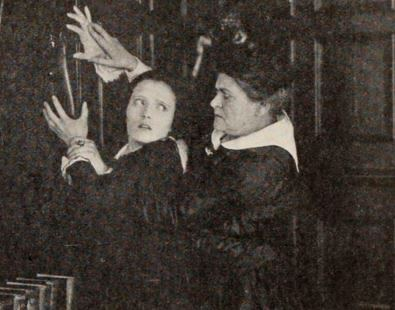
Pauline Starke and Lule Warrenton depicted in a review of Daughter Angele in Exhibitors Herald, 1918

Better known for her career as a director, Warrenton became the only woman director in the world at the time to have her own studio during her time at Universal. Warrenton did some of the writing for her films, but her assistant Allen Watt took responsibility for the majority of the writing. Warrenton's son, Gilbert Warrenton, was often in charge of photography in many of his mother's motion pictures.

Warrenton began her directing career primarily by filming comedies, but later made the previously unprecedented move to making films specifically designed for children, which she called "Film for Little Ones". Calling Linda was her first Film for Little Ones in 1916. Warrenton directed and produced A Bit o'Heaven in 1917, which featured four-year-old child acting prodigy Mary Louise; this film was an adaptation of Kate Douglas Wiggin's novel The Birds' Christmas Carol that sold over 1.5 million copies. Warrenton and Louise did multiple films together.

Due to her reputation as a great handler of "child players," Warrenton became known in Hollywood circles as "mother," and it was said at the time that she had "no peers in the handling of child players."

== Social influence ==
Warrenton was somewhat of a pioneer for the progression of womanhood and the inclusion of females in the workplace, especially within Hollywood.

In addition to running her own studio, Warrenton's private home was a social center for women in Hollywood. She was a key contributor to the movement within the Hollywood Film Company to establish a permanent home for the many women working as extras in Hollywood.

Warrenton also was one of four founders of the Hollywood Studio Club, an organization for which any woman connected to a motion picture studio in any capacity is eligible to join. This drama club originated in the basement of the Hollywood Public Library. Eventually the Y.W.C.A. got involved and the group flourished, growing in size to 175 members by 1917.

== Post Universal Studios career ==
Warrenton began her career at Universal Studios in 1912, but severed ties with the film giant in 1917 and continued to produce juvenile films independently.

Following the split with Universal, Warrenton eventually left Hollywood and joined the San Diego Conservatory of Music while simultaneously becoming the head of an all-women film company, also located in San Diego.

== Personal life ==
Warrenton had two children, although most people only know about her son Gilbert. She also had a daughter, Mrs. Virginia Zimmerman, who married a doctor in Los Angeles.

While still during her time at Universal, Warrenton contracted pneumonia in 1915, causing her to be bedridden for six weeks and unable to work. Upon her return to work, she was back in bed a day later, causing her to miss more time and opportunities.

Warrenton stood at a height of five feet, six inches tall, weighed 150 pounds, and had long brown hair with blue eyes. She died in 1932 at Laguna Hospital.

== Partial filmography ==
- The Werewolf (1913)
- Samson (1914)
- Bound on the Wheel (1915)
- Jewel (1915)
- The College Orphan (1915)
- Secret Love (1916)
- Her Bitter Cup (1916)
- The Gilded Spider (1916)
- Bobbie of the Ballet (1916)
- It Happened in Honolulu (1916)
- The Secret of the Swamp (1916)
- Princess Virtue (1917)
- The Silent Lady (1917)
- More Trouble (1918)
- Daughter Angele (1918)
- Heart of the Sunset (1918)
- The Wilderness Trail (1919)
- Molly of the Follies (1919)
- A Fugitive from Matrimony (1919)
- When a Man Rides Alone (1919)
- The Sin That Was His (1920)
- Blind Hearts (1921)
- The Jolt (1921)
- The Dangerous Moment (1921)
- Ladies Must Live (1921)
- Shirley of the Circus (1922)
- Calvert's Valley (1922)
- Strength of the Pines (1922)
