= The Dangerous Moment =

1921 film

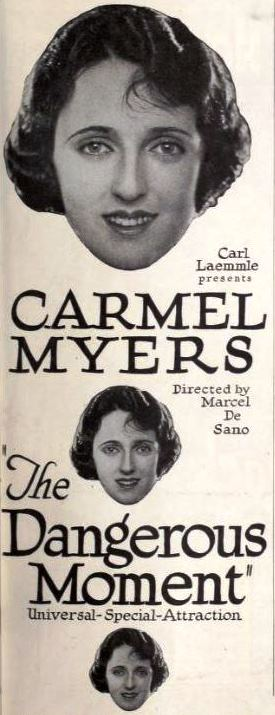
- Directed by: Marcel De Sano
- Written by: Douglas Z. Doty; William Clifton
- Produced by: Carl Laemmle
- Starring: Carmel Myers; Lule Warrenton; George Regas
- Cinematography: Bert Glennon
- Production company: Universal Pictures
- Distributed by: Universal Pictures
- Release date: March 29, 1921
- Running time: 50 minutes
- Country: United States
- Languages: Silent; English intertitles

The Dangerous Moment is a 1921 American silent drama film directed by Marcel De Sano and starring Carmel Myers, Lule Warrenton and George Regas.

== Cast ==
- Carmel Myers as Sylvia Palprini
- Lule Warrenton as Mrs. Tarkides
- George Regas as Movros Tarkides
- W.T. Fellows as Jack Reeve
- Billy Fay as Collins
- Bonnie Hill as Marjory Blake
- Herbert Heyes as George Duray
- Fred Becker as Henry Trent
- Marian Skinner as Aunt Cynthia Grey
- Bowditch M. Turner as Trotsky

== Bibliography ==
- Munden, Kenneth White. The American Film Institute Catalog of Motion Pictures Produced in the United States, Part 1. University of California Press, 1997.
