= Strength of the Pines =

1922 film

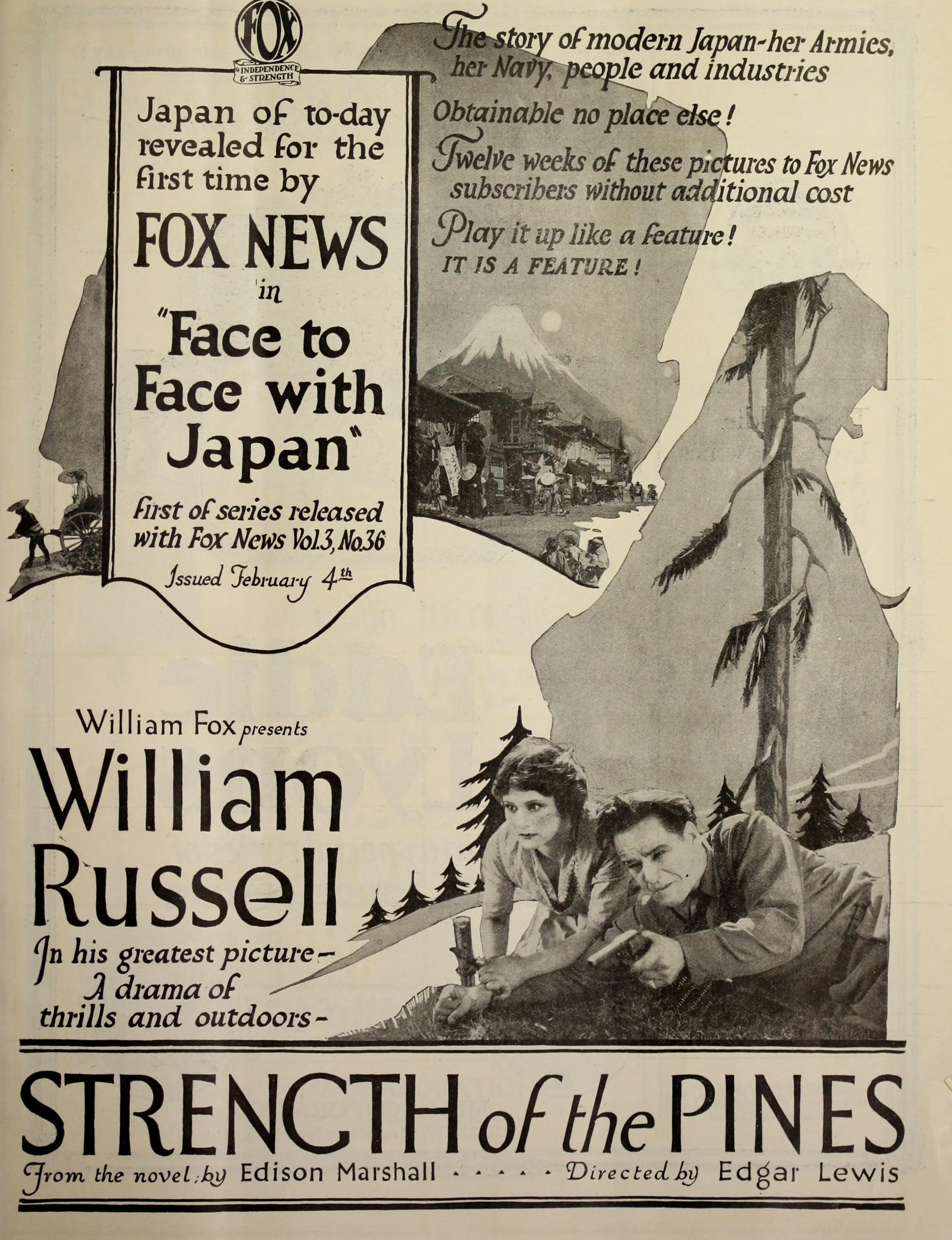
- Directed by: Edgar Lewis
- Written by: Louise Lewis
- Based on: The Strength of the Pines by Edison Marshall
- Produced by: William Fox
- Starring: William Russell; Irene Rich; Lule Warrenton
- Cinematography: Sol Polito; Don Short
- Production company: Fox Film
- Distributed by: Fox Film
- Release date: February 5, 1922
- Running time: 50 minutes
- Country: United States
- Languages: Silent; English intertitles

Strength of the Pines is 1922 American silent drama film directed by Edgar Lewis and starring William Russell, Irene Rich and Lule Warrenton. The film is sometimes referred to by the slightly altered title The Strength of the Pines.

== Cast ==
- William Russell as Bruce Duncan
- Irene Rich as Linda
- Lule Warrenton as Elmira Ross
- Arthur Morrison as Bill Turner
- Les Bates as Simon Turner

== Preservation ==
The film is currently lost.

== Bibliography ==
- Connelly, Robert B. The Silents: Silent Feature Films, 1910–36, Volume 40, Issue 2. December Press, 1998.
- Munden, Kenneth White. The American Film Institute Catalog of Motion Pictures Produced in the United States, Part 1. University of California Press, 1997.
