= Kate Douglas Wiggin House =

Historic house in Maine, United States

- U.S. National Register of Historic Places
- U.S. Historic district – Contributing property
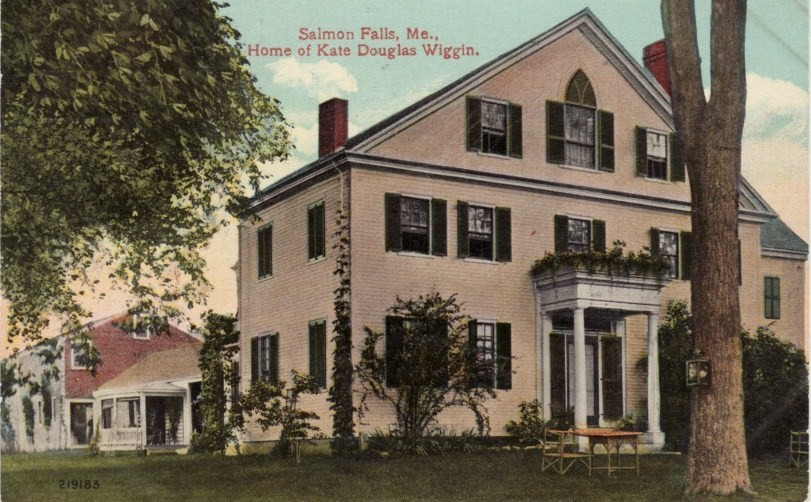
- Postcard view of Quillcote, 1916

- Location within Maine Location within the United States
- Location: Salmon Falls Rd., Hollis, Maine
- Coordinates: 43°35′50″N 70°33′20″W
- Area: 1 acre (0.40 ha)
- Built: 1797
- Architectural style: Greek Revival
- Part of: Salmon Falls (West) Historic District (ID87001858)
- NRHP reference No.: 77000142

Significant dates
- Added to NRHP: September 16, 1977
- Designated CP: October 30, 1987

The Kate Douglas Wiggin House, also known as Quillcote, is a historic house on Salmon Falls Road in Hollis, Maine. Built in 1797, the house is significant as the home of the writer Kate Douglas Wiggin from 1905 until her death in 1923, and as a fine example of adaptive architectural change over time. One room of the house features wall murals attributed to Rufus Porter. The house was listed on the National Register of Historic Places in 1977.

== Description and history ==
Quillcote is set on the west side of Salmon Falls Road in the Hollis side of Salmon Falls village, on the banks of the Saco River in southeastern Hollis. It is a 2 1/2-story wood-frame structure, five bays wide and two deep, with a front-facing gable roof and clapboard siding. This section has modest Greek Revival styling, including a fully pedimented gable that has three windows, the central one topped by a lancet-arched louver. The main entrance is centered on this facade, sheltered by a porch with Federal style Doric columns. To the rear of this block extends the oldest part of the house, a two-story wood-frame structure, with another extending to the right. Further ells extend further behind the house, connecting it to a barn.

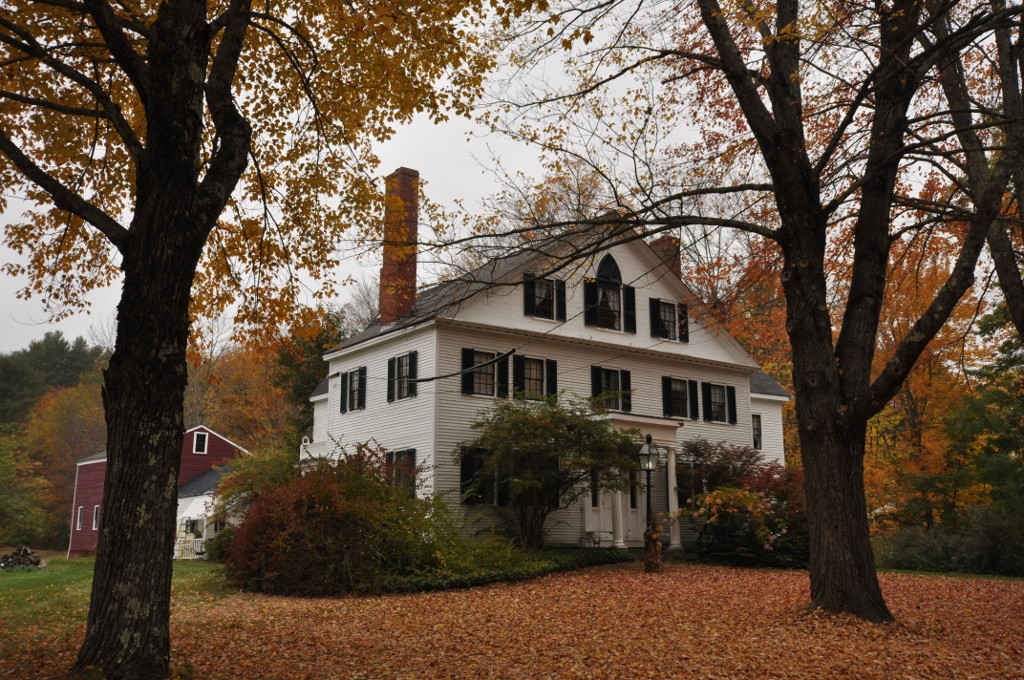
Quillcote, 2016

The interior is arranged with public spaces in the front of the house, and a sitting room, kitchen, and pantry space in the rear, with bedrooms on the second floor. One bedroom in the older part of the house has a curved ceiling, suggesting it may have served as a ballroom at one time. A balcony was added to this room in 1905, standing above a bay window projecting from the sitting room below. The interior's most intriguing room is completely painted in murals, with a golden frieze border running around the top. This work is estimated to date to about 1820, and may be the work of Rufus Porter, who was then an itinerant painter producing stylistically similar works.

The house's oldest portion was, according to local lore, built about 1797 by Jabez Bradbury. He and neighbor Thomas Carll exchanged houses in the early 19th century, and the Carll family is credited with bringing the house to most of its present appearance. Kate Douglas Wiggin, by then already a well-known author of children's books, acquired this house in 1905, having spent some years of her childhood in Salmon Falls. Her mother had, after her father's death, remarried to Albion Bradbury, whose house stands nearby. Widowed at the time, she named the house "Quillcote" (house of the pen), and lived there with her sister until both died.

== See also ==
- National Register of Historic Places listings in York County, Maine
