= Daughter Angele =

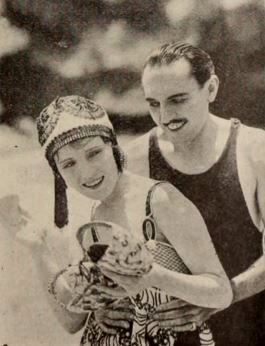
- Directed by: William C. Dowlan
- Cinematography: Elgin Lessley
- Distributed by: Triangle Film Corporation
- Release date: August 25, 1918
- Running time: 50 minutes
- Country: United States
- Languages: Silent; English intertitles

Daughter Angele is a 1918 American silent comedy-drama film, directed by William C. Dowlan.

== Cast ==
- Pauline Starke as Angele
- Walt Whitman as Anthony Brenton
- Eugene Burr as Frank Chumnige (as Gene Burr)
- Myrtle Rishell
- Philo McCullough
- Lule Warrenton
- Harold Holland
- Julia Mackley
