= First Congregational Church of Buxton =

Historic church in Maine, United States

- U.S. National Register of Historic Places
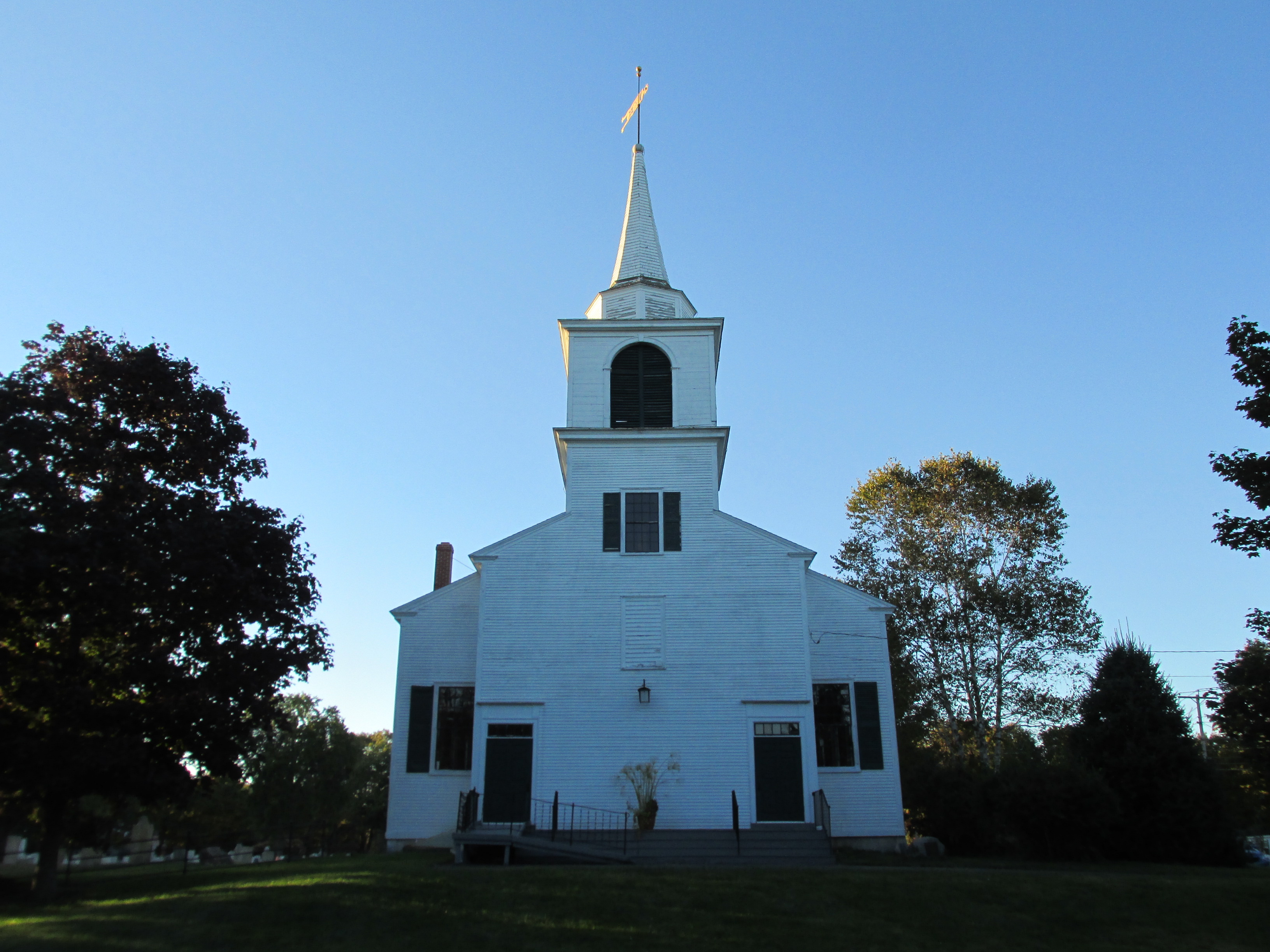
- First Congregational Church of Buxton

- Location within Maine Location within the United States
- Location: ME 112, Buxton, Maine
- Coordinates: 43°36′23″N 70°32′14″W
- Area: 1 acre (0.40 ha)
- Built: 1822
- Architectural style: Federal
- NRHP reference No.: 80000259
- Added to NRHP: June 22, 1980

The First Congregational Church of Buxton, also known locally as the Tory Hill Meetinghouse, is a historic church on ME 112 in Buxton, Maine. Built in 1822, it is an example of Federal period architecture, having had only modest alterations since its construction.

It is also notable for its association with the local author Kate Douglas Wiggin, serving as her inspiration for The Old Peabody Pew, a play that is now regularly performed at the church.

The building was listed on the National Register of Historic Places in 1980.

The congregation is associated with the United Church of Christ; its current pastor is Allison Flaherty.

== Description and history ==
The church is located at the northwest corner of Woodman Road and River Road (Maine State Route 112), just north of River Road's junction with United States Route 202. Oriented to face the southeast, it is a single-story wood-frame structure, with a gabled roof, clapboard siding, and a granite foundation. A square tower with belfry, projecting slightly at the center of the main facade, rises to an octagonal steeple and weathervane. The projecting section widens below the roof line, and encompasses two entrances near its outer corners. The side walls are six bays long, with tall square-sash windows. The interior is relatively plain, with bench pews and wainscoted walls.

The town of Buxton was incorporated in 1772, having been settled for some time. Land for this church property was granted in 1761, and the congregation was ministered by Paul Coffin from 1762 until his death 60 years later in 1821. In the following year, this church was built to replace the old meetinghouse. At an unknown date the original box pews were removed and replaced by the present bench pews; the original high pulpit remains, although it has been altered. The church is known as the "Tory Hill Meetinghouse" for the village, which became known as "Tory Hill" because local residents who opposed the War of 1812 refused to muster for militia service.

The building is noted for its literary association with the author Kate Douglas Wiggin, who lived nearby in Hollis in the late 19th century. She was instrumental in the founding of a community organization known as the Dorcas Society, for which she wrote The Old Peabody Pew. She also actively supported the church and other local groups, giving readings at the church for their benefit. The play is performed annually at the church each December.

== See also ==
- National Register of Historic Places listings in York County, Maine
