= Mother Carey's Chickens (film) =

1938 film by Rowland V. Lee

- Directed by: Rowland V. Lee
- Written by: S.K. Lauren; Gertrude Purcell
- Based on: Mother Carey's Chickens; 1911 novel by Kate Douglas Wiggin
- Produced by: Pandro S. Berman
- Starring: Anne Shirley; Ruby Keeler; Walter Brennan
- Cinematography: J. Roy Hunt
- Edited by: George Hively
- Music by: Roy Webb
- Production company: RKO Radio Pictures
- Distributed by: RKO Radio Pictures
- Release date: July 29, 1938
- Running time: 82 minutes
- Country: United States
- Language: English
- Budget: $358,000
- Box office: $703,000

Mother Carey's Chickens is a 1938 American drama film starring Anne Shirley and Ruby Keeler. The film was directed by Rowland V. Lee and based upon a 1917 play by Kate Douglas Wiggin and Rachel Crothers, which in turn was adapted from Wiggin's Mother Carey's Chickens.

At a low point in her career, Katharine Hepburn was offered the lead role, but she turned it down and instead bought out her RKO contract for $75,000 to become an independent actress.

In 1963, Walt Disney released Summer Magic, a loose remake of this film, with Hayley Mills as Nancy Carey.

== Plot ==
Mr. Carey, a captain in the United States Navy, dies during the Spanish–American War. His wife Margaret, daughters Nancy and Kitty and sons Gilbert and Peter are left behind. They are now on their own with only Capt. Carey's pension for income. The family moves into a series of ever-smaller rented houses while Mrs. Carey works in a textile mill. When she is injured, they lease a broken down mansion for a year at a nominal fee, and invest the captain's small life insurance payment to fix it up into a boarding house. Both daughters fall in love, Kitty with a local teacher and Nancy with Tom Hamilton, the son of the absentee owner.

When the Hamiltons put the house up for sale, the family is given an eviction order by Tom Hamilton, a doctor who wants the money from the sale to study in Europe. However, fate intervenes and Tom is called to save Peter from a serious illness, then falls in love with Nancy. The new owners, the Fullers, move in to force the family to vacate. The Careys and their beaus then try to scare off the Fullers by telling them the house is haunted, and making assorted spooky noises at night, hoping they will leave.

== Cast ==
- Anne Shirley as Nancy Carey
- Ruby Keeler as Katherine 'Kitty' Carey
- James Ellison as Ralph Thurston
- Fay Bainter as Mrs. Margaret Carey
- Walter Brennan as Mr. Ossian Popham
- Donnie Dunagan as Peter Carey
- Frank Albertson as Tom Hamilton Jr.
- Alma Kruger as Aunt Bertha
- Jackie Moran as Gilbert Carey
- Margaret Hamilton as Mrs. Pauline Fuller
- Virginia Weidler as Lally Joy Popham
- Ralph Morgan as Captain John Carey
- Phyllis Kennedy as Annabelle
- Harvey Clark as Mr. Clarence Fuller
- Lucille Ward as Mrs. Martha Popham
- George Irving as Mr. Thomas Hamilton Sr.
- Lew Kelly as Paperhanger (uncredited)

== Reception ==
The film earned a profit of $110,000.
