= Phyllis Kennedy =

American actress (1910–1998)

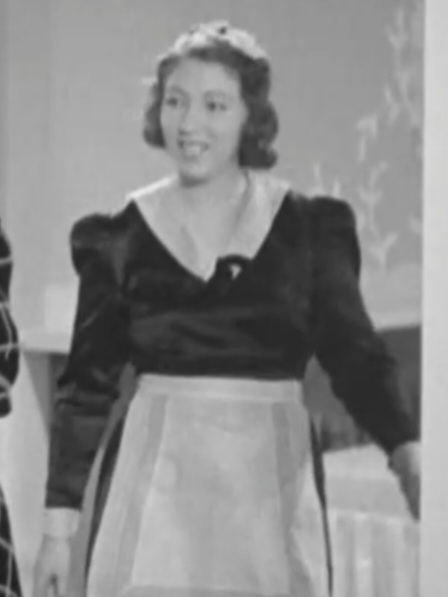
- Kennedy in Love Affair (1939)
- Born: June 16, 1914; Detroit, Michigan, U.S.
- Died: December 29, 1998 (aged 84); Los Angeles, California, U.S.
- Resting place: Westwood Village Memorial Park Cemetery
- Occupation: Actress
- Years active: 1932–1968
- Political party: Republican
- Spouse: Paul Card Howell (m. 1944; died 1994)
- Children: 2

Phyllis Kennedy (June 16, 1914 – December 29, 1998) was an American film actress.

== Early life ==
She was born on June 16, 1914, in Detroit, Michigan. Following her high school graduation in 1932, she got employment as a clothes model in a local department store. During her modeling period, one of her friends recommended that she try her hand at acting. She began her acting career on the New York stage in a small role in a 1935 production of Jane Eyre. Soon, she decided to try her hand in the film industry. Around 1935, she broke her back while dancing in a show in Denver and was told she would never dance again. Two years later, she was able to dance again.

== Hollywood years ==
Kennedy was noticed by Ginger Rogers when she performed as a chorus girl in Shall We Dance? She did some comedy dances for Rogers offstage, which impressed the other actress. This relationship led to her being cast as a maid in Stage Door with Rogers and Katharine Hepburn. She was eventually signed onto RKO Radio. She then began getting parts in films playing dimwitted servants; most notably in such films as Vivacious Lady (1938), Mother Carey's Chickens (1938), Love Affair (1939), East Side of Heaven (1939), and Anne of Windy Poplars (1940).

Well into the 1940s Kennedy made over twenty film appearances although a lot of her film roles were uncredited. In later years she made appearances on shows like the Lucy-Desi Comedy Hour, The Missourians, and The Lone Ranger. She also appeared as an uncredited Cockney in the film My Fair Lady (1964). Her last screen appearance was in Finian's Rainbow in 1968 in an uncredited role.

== Later years and personal life ==
Kennedy's cremains were scattered into the Garden of Roses at Westwood Village Memorial Park Cemetery.

== Partial filmography ==
- Stage Door (1937) - Maid
- Vivacious Lady (1938)
- Mother Carey's Chickens (1938) - Annabelle
- Love Affair (1939)
- East Side of Heaven (1939)
- Laugh Your Blues Away (1942) - Patricia Conklin
- Yankee Doodle Dandy (1942) - (uncredited)
- An American Romance (1944) - Receptionist
- The Heavenly Body (1944) - Ethel (the maid)
- Faithful in My Fashion (1946) - Secretary
- Chicago Deadline (1949) - Maid
- A Dangerous Profession (1949) - Maid
