= The Birds' Christmas Carol =

Book by Kate Douglas Wiggin

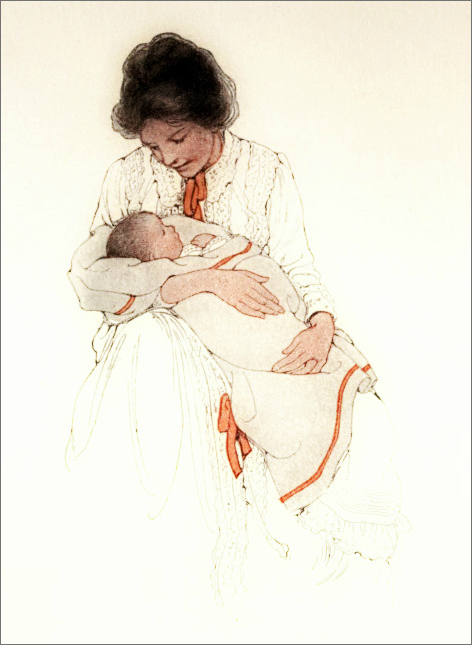
- Illustration by Katharine R. Wireman from The Birds' Christmas by Kate Douglas Wiggin
- Author: Kate Douglas Wiggin
- Illustrator: Katharine R. Wireman
- Publication date: 1888

The Birds' Christmas Carol is a novel by American writer Kate Douglas Wiggin, printed privately in 1886 and published in 1888 with illustrations by Katharine R. Wireman. Wiggin published the book to help fund the Silver Street Free Kindergarten in San Francisco, which she founded in 1878.

== Overview ==
The story is about Carol Bird, a Christmas-born child, a young girl who is unusually loving and generous, having a positive effect on everyone with whom she comes into contact. She is the youngest member of her family and has several devoted older brothers. At about the age of 5, Carol contracts an unspecified illness (possibly tuberculosis), and by the time she is 10, she is bedridden; physicians say that she does not have long to live. Most of the brief novel's plot involves Carol making plans for a Christmas celebration for the nine Ruggles children, a poor, working-class family living near the Birds.

Wiggin's story is primarily a moral tale about a loving and generous child. However, unlike the children often featured in similar stories of the period, Carol is refreshingly intelligent and cheerful instead of pious. The story is also enlivened by many humorous touches, particularly in the scenes of the Ruggles family's home life.

In 1917, the story was adapted as the silent movie "A Bit o' Heaven" starring Mary Louise as Carol, Donald Watson and Ella Gilbert as Mr. and Mrs. Bird and Mary Talbot as Mrs. Ruggles.
