= Summer Magic (film) =

1963 film by James Neilson

- Official theatrical poster
- Directed by: James Neilson
- Written by: Sally Benson
- Based on: Mother Carey's Chickens by Kate Douglas Wiggin
- Produced by: Walt Disney; Ron Miller
- Starring: Hayley Mills; Burl Ives; Dorothy McGuire; Deborah Walley; Eddie Hodges; Jimmy Mathers; Michael J. Pollard; Wendy Turner; Una Merkel
- Cinematography: William Snyder
- Edited by: Robert Stafford
- Music by: Songs: Richard M. Sherman; Robert B. Sherman; Score: Buddy Baker
- Production company: Walt Disney Productions
- Distributed by: Buena Vista Distribution
- Release date: July 7, 1963
- Running time: 110 minutes
- Country: United States
- Language: English
- Box office: $4,350,000 (US/ Canada rentals)

Summer Magic is a 1963 American musical film directed by James Neilson, and starring Hayley Mills, Burl Ives, and Dorothy McGuire in a story about an early 1900s Boston widow and her children taking up residence in a small town in Maine. The film was based on the novel Mother Carey's Chickens by Kate Douglas Wiggin. It was the fourth of six films that Mills appeared in for Disney, and the young actress received a Golden Globe nomination for her work. While reviews of the film were mostly positive, Mills herself later criticized it as "the worst".

== Plot ==
In the early 20th-century, financial problems force young Boston widow Margaret Carey and her 3 children to move out of their home. Nancy, the dramatic but kind-hearted eldest child, remembers a large yellow house that the Careys had admired when they visited the small town of Beulah, Maine, and makes an inquiry about it. Upon the sale of the family's treasured piano ("Flitterin'"), Nancy reveals that the house is vacant and the family decides to relocate to the country ("Beautiful Beulah").

When the Careys arrive in Beulah they realize they're slightly out-of-place although the town welcomes them. Overall, the Careys find that moving to the country was the best decision for them and they're content in their new home ("Summer Magic"). The house however is in a shameful state of neglect, and caretaker Osh Popham, against his wife's wishes, offers cheap labor to make the house livable, as well as offering free products from his hardware store. He also steers young Peter in the right direction, trading him a pair of overalls for his "Buster Brown suit" in which he now feels too citified, and offering him haircut money and carpentry lessons.

Just when the Careys are settled in and things are going better, they find out that orphaned Cousin Julia's adoptive parents have run into their own financial problems and want to send her to the Careys. They reluctantly agree, and while they get ready for her, Gilly and Nancy entertain Peter with jokes about her appearance and snobby, snotty personality ("Pink of Perfection"). When Julia arrives, she's even worse than her cousins remembered. Part of her welcome seems to include being jumped on by Peter's large dog Sam in the middle of the night. Aghast at Beulah's primitive ways, she forces Osh's daughter Lally Joy to help her bathe in the kitchen rather than lug kettles of hot water up the stairs.

While Nancy and Lally Joy cope with Julia, Peter enjoys working on the house with Osh, who entertains him with stories of bugs the like of which Peter hadn't dealt with in the city ("Ugly Bug Ball"). When Margaret informs Osh of their still-failing finances, Osh, hoping to keep them in town, makes up a request from the house's owner, Tom Hamilton, in exchange for no rent. He pretends that Mr. Hamilton has answered in the affirmative, only requesting that on Halloween the Careys must have a ceremony for his dead mother and find a decent place for her picture. The Careys accept and Osh chooses a fake picture for the ceremony, but Osh's wife Mariah, who has been on to his lies from the beginning, visits the yellow house to tell the Careys that Mr. Hamilton has no idea that they are there. Before she can spill the news, Osh fakes a fall from the second story, claims an injured leg, and insist that his wife help him get home.

After church the next Sunday, Nancy and Julia spot a handsome man, Charles Bryant, who has moved to Beulah to be the new schoolteacher. They invite him to a lawn party at the yellow house, where both try to win his affections, Nancy with her smarts and Julia with her looks. Julia wins, leaving Nancy too jealous to enjoy the quiet evening after the party ("On the Front Porch"). In their bedroom, her jealousy and anger drive her to reveal that Julia's adoptive parents "dumped" her on the Careys after gambling away their money. Julia flees to Aunt Margaret for assurance that her parents truly loved her, and Margaret reveals that her parents' situation is looking good enough that they are about ready for her to come home. This makes Nancy realize that she has grown to love Julia despite her many flaws (and her having "won" Charles), and she begs her to stay. Julia accepts, and prepares to move in permanently with the Careys.

As Halloween approaches, everyone gets ready for the big party. Lally Joy, who harbors a big crush on Gilly, displays her ugly dress to Nancy and Julia, fretting embarrassment at the party. Nancy and Julia promise to redesign the dress as they give her pointers on how to act around boys ("Femininity"). On the day of the party, a handsome young man appears at the yellow house and meets Nancy. She informs him that they'd been living in the house and tells him about the party for Mr. Hamilton's mother. The stranger quickly heads for Osh's store, where it is revealed that he is Tom Hamilton. Osh comes clean about renting the house to the Careys, inspired by Nancy's good-heartedness. Indignant, Tom leaves the store.

Reluctant to escort Lally Joy to the party, Gilly becomes more willing as she makes her appearance in her beautiful redesigned dress. Seeing them together and Charles and Julia together, Nancy realizes that she's the only one without a partner; after talking it over with her mother, she decides to attend on her own. As she descends the stairs she runs into Tom Hamilton, who accompanies her to the party. Nancy presents the picture Osh had produced, but it is a frighteningly ugly woman and Tom feels insulted and angry at Osh. He reveals his true identity to the thoroughly-embarrassed Nancy, and as he has taken a fancy to her, he asks her to dance. As the party gets going, Osh exclaims that things always work out in the end.

== Cast ==
- Hayley Mills as Nancy Carey
- Burl Ives as Osh Popham
- Dorothy McGuire as Margaret Carey
- Una Merkel as Mariah Popham
- Deborah Walley as Julia Carey
- James Stacy as Charles Bryant
- Eddie Hodges as Gilly Carey
- Jimmy Mathers as Peter Carey
- Michael J. Pollard as Digby Popham
- Wendy Turner as Lallie Joy Popham
- Peter Brown as Tom Hamilton
- O.Z. Whitehead as Mr. Perkins
- Hilda Plowright as Mary
- Marcy McGuire as Ellen
- Harry Holcombe as Henry
- Ina Kent as Opal

== Songs ==
1. "Flitterin'"
2. "Beautiful Beulah"
3. "Summer Magic"
4. "Pink of Perfection"
5. "The Ugly Bug Ball"
6. "On the Front Porch"
7. "Femininity"

== Production ==
The screenplay was adapted by Sally Benson, author of the semi-autobiographical short stories that were the basis of M-G-M's similarly themed early 1900s era Meet Me in St. Louis (1944), starring Judy Garland and Margaret O'Brien.

At first, Walt Disney did not care for "Ugly Bug Ball", but songwriter Robert Sherman explained "that to bugs, other bugs were not ugly even if they looked ugly to us, beauty being in the eye of the beholder". Disney liked the idea and the song went on to become one of the popular songs of the year. It was sung by Burl Ives. "On the Front Porch" is songwriter Robert Sherman's personal favorite song from his own work.

It was the second of two films Deborah Walley made for Disney, the other being Bon Voyage!.

== Release ==
The film poster and other associated advertising art were illustrated by artist Paul Wenzel.

== Reception ==
Variety called the film "an easy-to-take entertainment that promises to be of particular delight to the younger element. The Disney trademark shows through all the way, meaning devotees of Tennessee Williams had better not be invited." John L. Scott of the Los Angeles Times wrote: "School vacationers, and their parents, will find that Walt Disney's 'Summer Magic' lives up to its title admirably ... The plot of 'Summer Magic' is slim but producer Disney and director James Neilson have worked sentimentality and humor into a nice blend." Richard L. Coe of The Washington Post stated, "'Summer Magic' was a pleasure to the small fry who packed the Metropolitan yesterday, but this Walt Disney gift, which includes Hayley Mills and Burl Ives, will charm oldsters as well." The pseudonymous "Mae Tinee" of the Chicago Tribune wrote that "I was disappointed in this one. It is a perfectly clean, wholesome story which seems to aim at the amusing nostalgia of a 'Meet Me in St. Louis' but never achieves it. The plot is both calculated and obvious and all the characters are drawn with a heavy hand." The Monthly Film Bulletin commented that the ingredients of the film "could mean a sticky confection, but thanks to the intelligent, and at times very funny script, and a well integrated cast, the result is a delicious soufflé."

In the 21st century, Filmink called the film "a bit bland" and said Maguire "looks like she's going to fall asleep".

Mills herself later said that [Summer Magic] was "the worst of the films she made for Disney".

== Bibliography ==
- Sherman, Robert B. Walt's Time: From Before to Beyond. Santa Clarita: Camphor Tree Publishers, 1998.
