= Emma Jacobina Christiana Marwedel =

- Born: February 27, 1818; Hann. Münden, Germany
- Died: November 17, 1893 (aged 75)

Emma Jacobina Christiana Marwedel, also known as Emma Marwedel (February 27, 1818 – November 17, 1893), was a German-American educator, known for her establishment of schools based upon Friedrich Fröbel's ideas.

== Early life ==
Marwedel was born on February 27, 1818, in Hann. Münden.

== Educator ==
Marwedel was a teacher in Germany. In 1867, she became the first director of the Girls' Industrial School in Hamburg. Leveraging Friedrich Fröbel's ideas, she also operated a kindergarten.

Elizabeth Peabody visited Marwedel in Germany and was impressed by her. After being invited by Peabody and Caroline Severance to come to the United States, Marwedel founded the first private kindergarten in Washington, D.C. by 1872. She developed a kindergarten teacher-training program and established additional schools near Long Island, Los Angeles, and Brentwood.

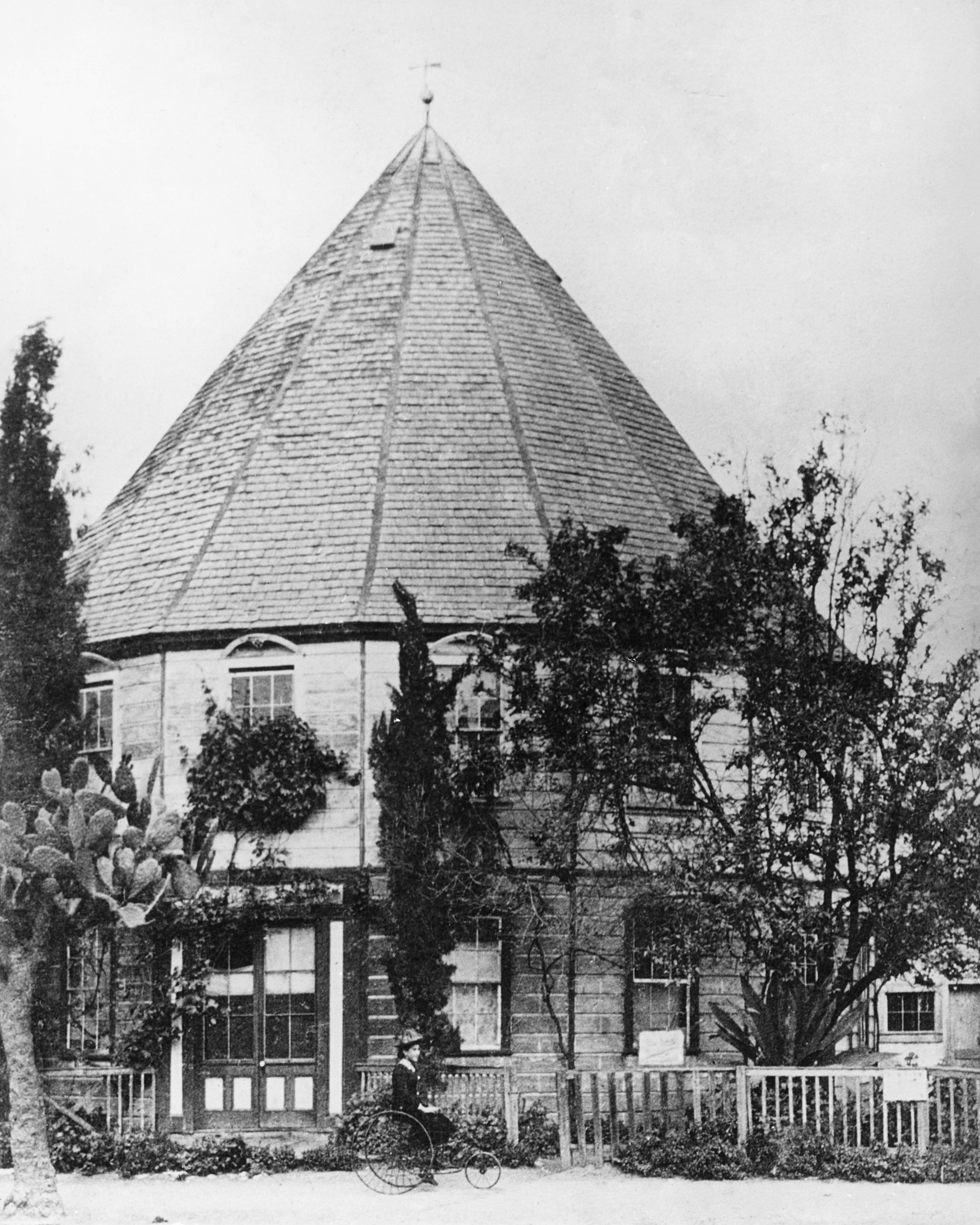
Round House for the Pacific Kindergarten Normal School, circa 1880-1885

In 1880, she opened her model kindergarten, Pacific Kindergarten Normal School, which she operated for six years. She retired in 1886.

== Later years and death ==
Marwedel died on November 17, 1893, in San Francisco in a German hospital.

== Publications ==
- Conscious Motherhood: or the Earliest Unfolding of the Child in the Cradle, Nursery and Kindergarten (1887)
- The Connecting Link, to Continue the Three-Fold Development of the Child from the Cradle to the Manual-Labor School (1891)
- Undated pamphlets such as An Appeal for Justice to Childhood, Games and Studies in Live Forms and Colors of Nature for Home and School.
