= Rebecca of Sunnybrook Farm (1917 film) =

1917 film by Marshall Neilan

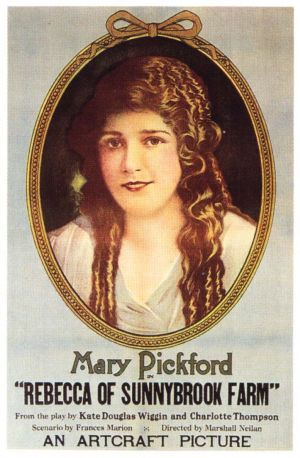
- Theatrical poster
- Directed by: Marshall Neilan
- Written by: Frances Marion
- Based on: Rebecca of Sunnybrook Farm; 1903 novel by Kate Douglas Wiggin; 1910 play by Charlotte Thompson
- Starring: Mary Pickford; Eugene O'Brien
- Cinematography: Walter Stradling
- Production company: Mary Pickford Company
- Distributed by: Artcraft Pictures Corporation
- Release date: September 22, 1917
- Running time: 70 minutes
- Country: United States
- Language: Silent (English intertitles)

Rebecca of Sunnybrook Farm

Rebecca of Sunnybrook Farm is a 1917 American silent comedy-drama film directed by Marshall Neilan based upon the 1903 novel of the same name by Kate Douglas Wiggin. This version is notable for having been adapted by famed female screenwriter Frances Marion. The film was made by the "Mary Pickford Company" and was an acclaimed box office hit. When the play premiered on Broadway in the 1910 theater season the part of Rebecca was played by Edith Taliaferro.

== Plot ==
As described in a film magazine, Rebecca Randall is taken into the home of her aunt Hannah, a strict New England woman. Rebecca meets Adam Ladd, a young man of the village, and they become great friends. One day Rebecca promises to marry Adam when she becomes of age. Unable to withstand her pranks any longer, her aunt sends her away to a boarding school. She graduates a beautiful young lady. Shortly thereafter, Adam demands a fulfillment of her promise.

== Cast ==
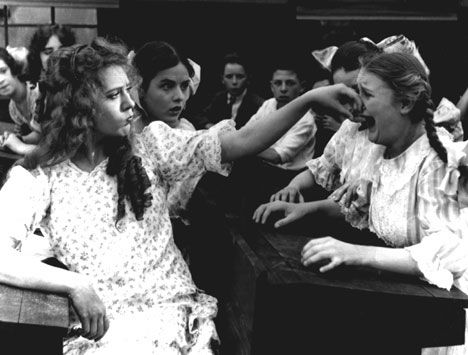
Scene from the film

- Mary Pickford as Rebecca Randall
- Eugene O'Brien as Adam Ladd
- Helen Jerome Eddy as Hannah Randall
- Charles Stanton Ogle as Mr. Cobb
- Marjorie Daw as Emma Jane Perkins
- Mayme Kelso as Jane Sawyer
- Jane Wolfe as Mrs. Randall
- Josephine Crowell as Miranda Sawyer
- Jack McDonald as Reverend Jonathan Smellie
- Violet Wilkey as Minnie Smellie
- F. A. Turner as Mr. Simpson
- Kate Toncray as Mrs. Simpson
- Emma Gordes as Clara Belle Simpson
- Wesley Barry as School Boy/Ringmaster (uncredited)
- Milton Berle in a bit part (uncredited)

== Production ==
Rebecca of Sunnybrook Farm was filmed in Pleasanton, California. Additional scenes were also filmed at the Hunsucker Ranch in Scotts Valley, California, which was chosen for its New England-style farm setting.

The Hunsucker Ranch was a popular filming location during the silent film era and was later used for the 1931 film Way Back Home, starring Seth Parker, and the 1934 MGM film Hide-Out, starring Robert Montgomery and Maureen O’Sullivan.

== Reception ==
Like many American films of the time, Rebecca of Sunnybrook Farm was subject to cuts by city and state film censorship boards. The Chicago Board of Censors required a cut of the intertitle "I have just learned the Simpsons are not married."

== Critical Assessment ==
Acknowledging that Rebecca was a “huge hit.”, biographer Jeanine Basinger observes that “Today, when an excerpt is chosen as a typical Mary Pickford scene, it’s often one from this film.” Basinger continues:

It’s unfortunate...because actually it presents one of Pickford’s more heavy-handed performances. More than one film historian has suggested that Rebecca is the main source of misunderstanding of Pickford’s image...Its certainly true that Mary never lets up for a minute in Rebecca—winking, stomping, prancing, too cute for words...[but] her actions lack the spontaneity she displays in her best roles...

Basinger adds that, by 1917, moviegoers favored the then 25-year-old Pickford “when she pretended to be a little girl” in her character portrayals.

== See also ==
- Rebecca of Sunnybrook Farm, 1909 play
- Rebecca of Sunnybrook Farm, 1932 film
- Rebecca of Sunnybrook Farm, 1938 film starring Shirley Temple

== Sources ==
- Basinger, Jeanine. 1999. Silent Stars. Alfred A. Knopf, New York. ISBN 0-679-43840-8
