= Mother Carey's Chickens (novel) =

Novel by Kate Douglas Wiggin

- Author: Kate Douglas Wiggin
- Language: English
- Genre: Young adult, classics, historical fiction
- Publisher: Houghton Mifflin
- Publication date: 1911
- Media type: Print

Mother Carey's Chickens is a novel by Kate Douglas Wiggin published in 1911 by Houghton Mifflin.

== Plot summary ==
The book tells the story of a poor-but-happy family of four children who, in spite of being fatherless, make the lives of others better. Their home life becomes complicated when Julia, a snobbish cousin, comes to live with them. The Carey children suffer many disappointments (Gilbert must forgo college, for example), but Julia is transformed when she realizes happiness has little to do with wealth.

== Adaptations ==
The story was dramatized in 1917, and later adapted to film. The 1938 RKO film version stars Anne Shirley and Fay Bainter as Nancy and Mother Carey respectively, and the 1963 Disney musical version (Summer Magic) stars Hayley Mills and Dorothy McGuire.
