= Rebecca of Sunnybrook Farm (1932 film) =

1932 film

- Directed by: Alfred Santell
- Written by: S.N. Behrman (screenplay); Guy Bolton; Sonya Levien
- Based on: Rebecca of Sunnybrook Farm; 1903 novel by Kate Douglas Wiggin; 1910 play by Charlotte Thompson
- Starring: Marian Nixon; Ralph Bellamy
- Cinematography: Glen MacWilliams
- Edited by: Ralph Dietrich
- Music by: Hugo Friedhofer; Arthur Lange
- Distributed by: Fox Film Corporation
- Release date: July 3, 1932
- Running time: 75 minutes
- Country: United States
- Language: English

Rebecca of Sunnybrook Farm is a 1932 American pre-Code film based on the 1903 children's novel by Kate Douglas Wiggin.

It was filmed by Fox Film Corporation and directed by Alfred Santell. The film starred Marian Nixon as Rebecca and co-starred Ralph Bellamy.

== Plot ==
A young girl from Sunnybrook goes to live with her wealthy relatives and falls in love with a doctor.

== Cast ==
- Marian Nixon as Rebecca
- Ralph Bellamy as Dr. Ladd
- Mae Marsh as Aunt Jane
- Louise Closser Hale as Aunt Miranda
- Alan Hale as Mr. Simpson
- Sarah Padden as Mrs. Cobb
- Alphonse Ethier as Mr. Cobb
- Eula Guy as Mrs. Simpson
- Ronald Harris as Jack o' Lantern
- Willis Marks as Jacob

== Other adaptations ==
- Rebecca of Sunnybrook Farm, 1909 play
- Rebecca of Sunnybrook Farm, 1917 film
- Rebecca of Sunnybrook Farm, 1938 film starring Shirley Temple
