= Rebecca of Sunnybrook Farm =

1903 novel by Kate Douglas Wiggin

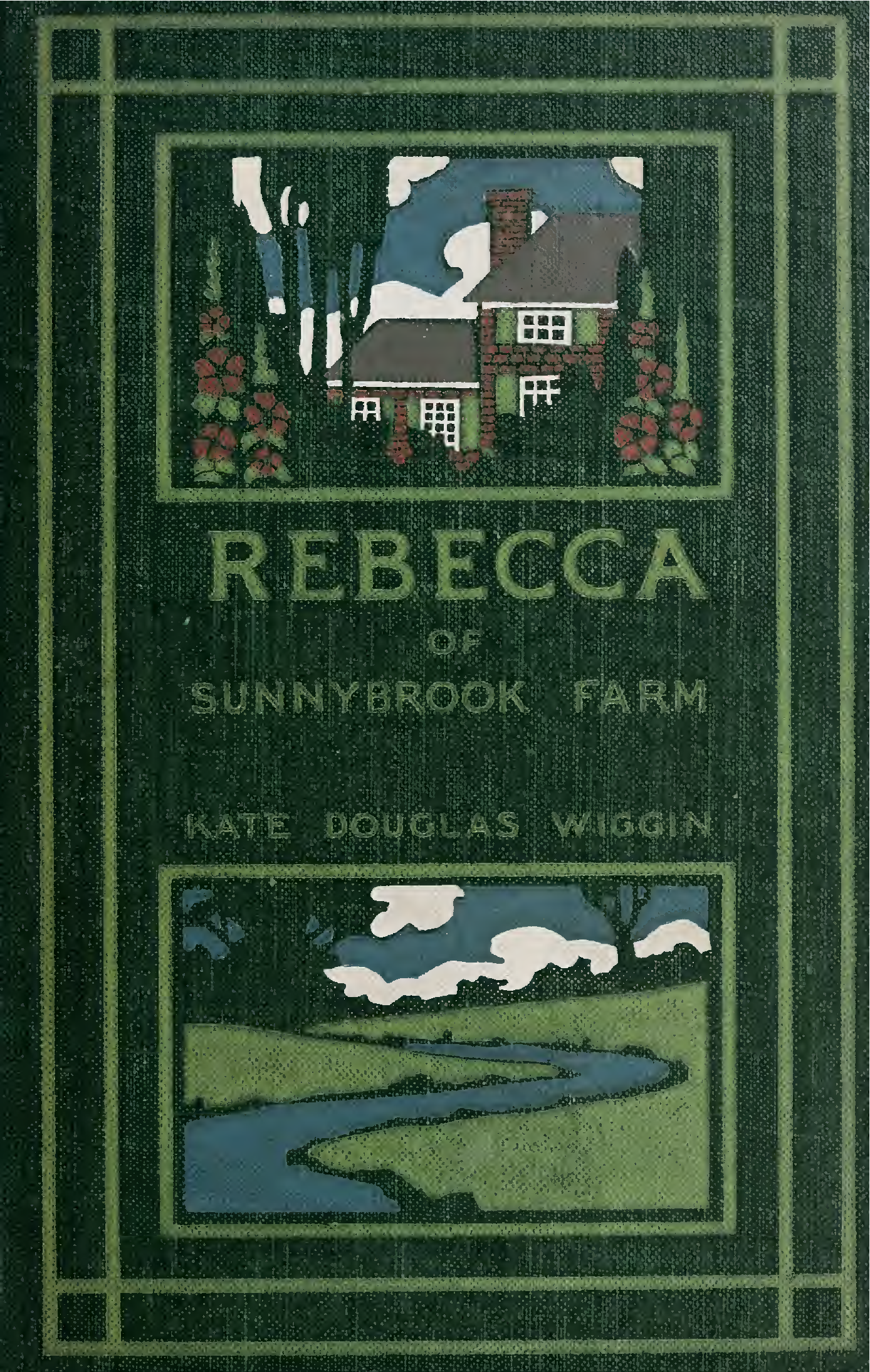
- Author: Kate Douglas Wiggin
- Language: English
- Genre: Children's novel
- Publisher: Houghton Mifflin
- Publication date: 1903
- Publication place: United States
- Media type: Print (Hardback)
- OCLC: 4738229

Rebecca of Sunnybrook Farm is a children's novel by American writer Kate Douglas Wiggin. Published in 1903, it tells the story of Rebecca Rowena Randall and her aunts, one stern and one kind, in the fictional village of Riverboro, Maine. Rebecca's joy for life inspires her aunts, but she faces many trials in her young life, gaining wisdom and understanding. Wiggin wrote a sequel, New Chronicles of Rebecca. Eric Wiggin, a grand-nephew of the author, wrote updated versions of several Rebecca books, including a concluding story. The story was adapted for the theatrical stage and filmed three times, once with Shirley Temple in the title role.

== Synopsis ==
The novel opens with Rebecca's journey from her family's farm to live with her two aunts, her mother's older sisters Miranda and Jane Sawyer, in their brick house in Riverboro. Rebecca, named after both the heroines in Ivanhoe, is the second-oldest of seven children. The family is barely scraping by three years after Rebecca's father's death. Miranda and Jane had wanted Hannah, the eldest sister, because of her household skills and pragmatic nature, but her mother needs her at home for the same reasons and sends Rebecca instead.

Despite her impoverished background, Rebecca is imaginative and charming. She often composes little poems and songs to express her feelings or to amuse her siblings. It is she who named their farm "Sunnybrook". Rebecca quickly wins over Jeremiah Cobb, the stagecoach driver, but fails to impress Miranda, who calls her the image of her shiftless father and determines to train Rebecca to be a proper young lady who won't shame the Sawyer name. Jane becomes Rebecca's protector and acts as a buffer between her and Miranda. Jane teaches Rebecca to sew, cook, and manage a household. Rebecca's liveliness and curiosity brighten Jane's life and refresh her spirit.

While at Riverboro, Rebecca meets and befriends Emma Jane Perkins at school, and the two become best friends. She does well at school, but she struggles to live up to Miranda's rigid standards, as Miranda views her as "all Randall and no Sawyer." After a successful school exhibition in which Rebecca performed with irrepressible enthusiasm, Miranda criticizes her instead for a variety of errors in the house. Unhappily, Rebecca decides to return to Sunnybrook, but is talked out of it by Jeremiah Cobb. Rebecca resolves to stay and try harder to please Miranda.

Rebecca becomes involved with the Simpsons at school, a large and poor family similar to her own. Two of the older Simpsons children, Clara Belle and Susan Simpson, begin a business venture selling soap for the Excelsior Soap Company, which earns them a commission per sale. The sisters enlist Rebecca's and Emma Jane's help, and the girls respond enthusiastically. While selling the soap, Rebecca encounters a young businessman. Learning that the girls are working for the sake of others and impressed by Rebecca's winning ways, the businessman buys all of their soap. Rebecca dubs him Mr. Aladdin, because the Simpsons use the commissions to buy a lamp. Thenceforth Mr. Aladdin (real name Adam Ladd) takes a special interest in Rebecca. He offers to help fund Rebecca's education, but Miranda refuses his charity.

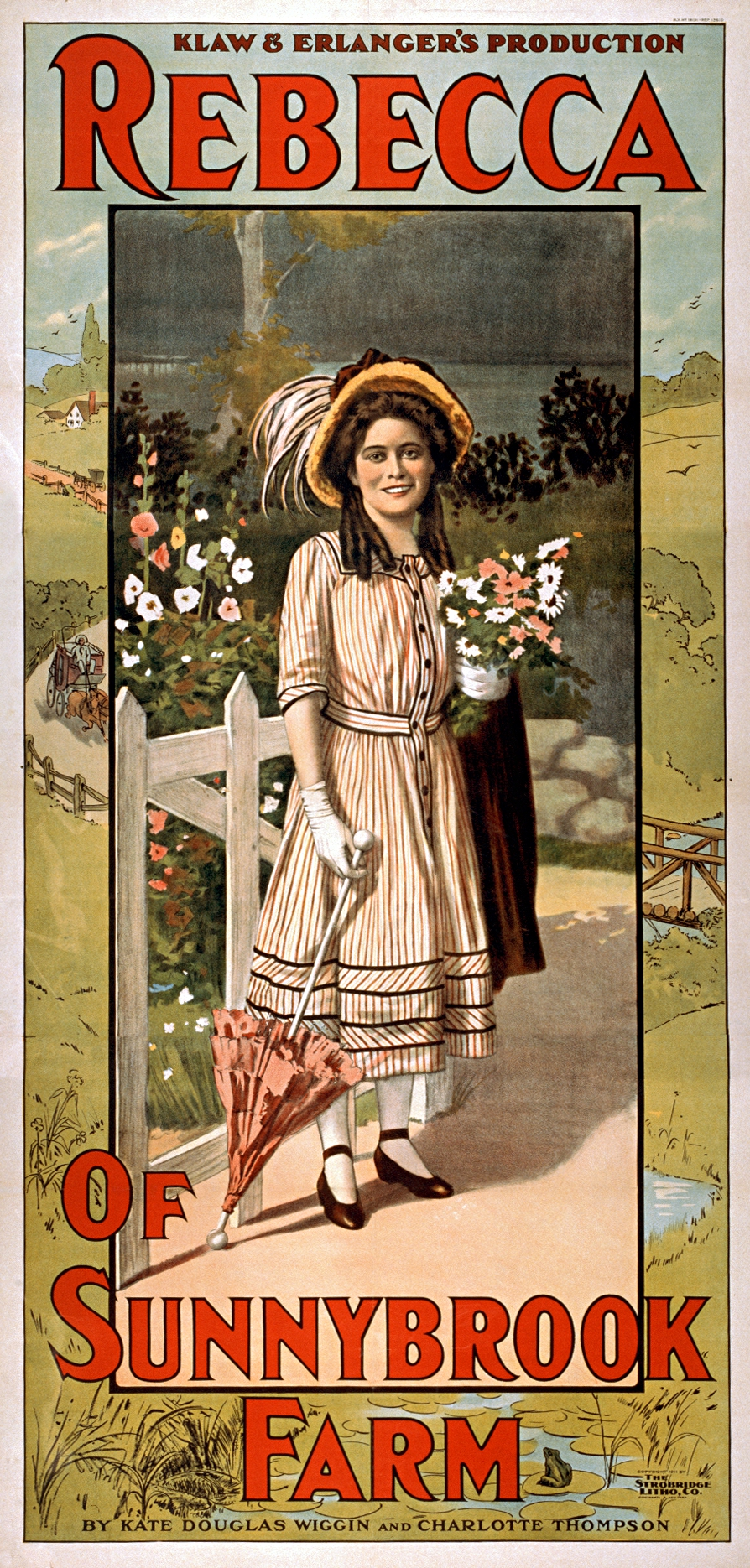
Poster for the stage adaptation of Rebecca of Sunnybrook Farm starring Edith Taliaferro produced by Klaw & Erlanger, 1910

Rebecca proves to be a good student, especially in English, and goes on to attend high school in Wareham. Here she meets a new teacher, Miss Emily Maxwell, who becomes Rebecca's bosom friend and mentor. Adam is also a trustee at Wareham, and he funds an English composition competition at the school. Rebecca wins the top prize with Miss Emily's help, which she uses to help pay Sunnybrook's mortgage. Under Miss Emily's and Adam's guidance, Rebecca flourishes at school, becoming a young lady with the same high spirit and a talent for writing. She applies for a teaching job in Augusta upon graduation, but her mother has an accident and Rebecca must go home to look after her and the farm. While she's away, Miranda dies and leaves the Sawyer house and land to Rebecca. A railway company will buy Sunnybrook Farm for construction purposes, which will give the Randall family sufficient to live on, while Miranda's will provides Rebecca enough money to become an independent woman who can help her siblings. The novel ends with her exclaiming, "God bless Aunt Miranda! God bless the brick house that was! God bless the brick house that is to be!"

== Adaptations ==
=== Play ===
Rebecca of Sunnybrook Farm was dramatized for the theater in 1909. Wiggin co-wrote the play with Charlotte Thompson. It was produced for Broadway by Klaw & Erlanger in 1909. Before opening on Broadway, it toured Boston and New England where it was warmly received.

=== Film ===
The story was filmed three times. Shirley Temple played Rebecca in the more freely interpreted adaptation of 1938.

- Rebecca of Sunnybrook Farm (1917 film)
- Rebecca of Sunnybrook Farm (1932 film)
- Rebecca of Sunnybrook Farm (1938 film)

=== Animation ===
An anime short film was made in 2020.
