= Kate Douglas Wiggin =

American writer (1856–1923)

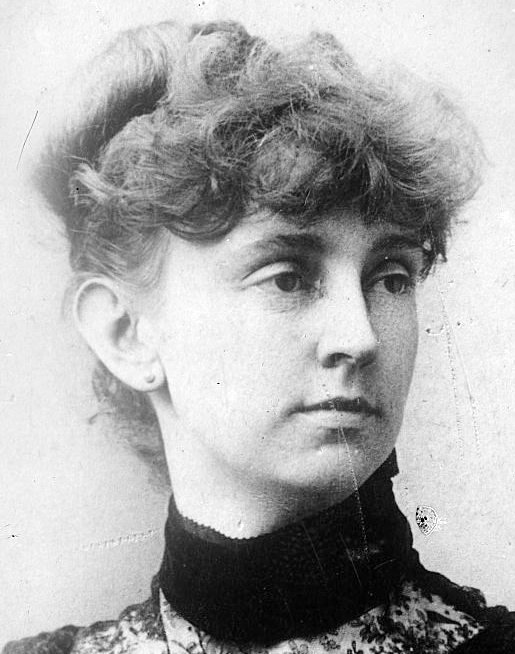
- Wiggin depicted in "A Woman of the Century"
- Born: Kate Douglas Smith; September 28, 1856; Philadelphia, Pennsylvania, U.S.
- Died: August 24, 1923 (aged 66); Harrow, Middlesex, England
- Education: Gorham Female Seminary; Morison Academy (Baltimore)
- Occupation: Author
- Spouses: Bradley Wiggin; George Christopher Riggs

Signature
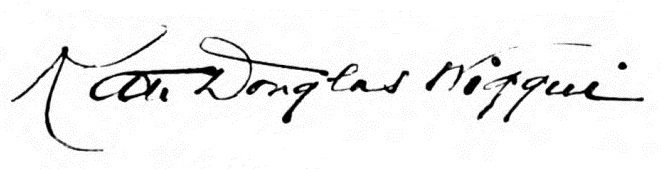

Kate Douglas Wiggin (September 28, 1856 – August 24, 1923) was an American educator, author and composer. She wrote children's stories, most notably the classic children's novel Rebecca of Sunnybrook Farm, and composed collections of children's songs. She started the first free kindergarten in San Francisco, the Silver Street Free Kindergarten, in 1878. With her sister Nora during the 1880s, she also established a training school for kindergarten teachers. Wiggin devoted her adult life to the welfare of children in an era when children were commonly thought of as cheap labor.

Wiggin went to California to study kindergarten methods. She began to teach in San Francisco with her sister assisting her, and the two were instrumental in the establishment of over 60 kindergartens for the poor in San Francisco and Oakland. When she later moved from California to New York, without kindergarten work on hand, she devoted herself to literature. She sent The Story of Patsy and The Bird's Christmas Carol to Houghton, Mifflin & Co., who accepted them at once.

Besides her talent for storytelling, she was also a musician, sang well, and composed settings for her poems. She was also an excellent elocutionist.

After the death of her husband in 1889, she returned to California to resume her kindergarten work, serving as the head of a kindergarten normal school. Some of her other works included Cathedral Courtship, A Summer in a Canon, Timothy's Quest, The Story Hour, Kindergarten Chimes, Polly Oliver's Problem, and Children's Rights.

== Early life ==
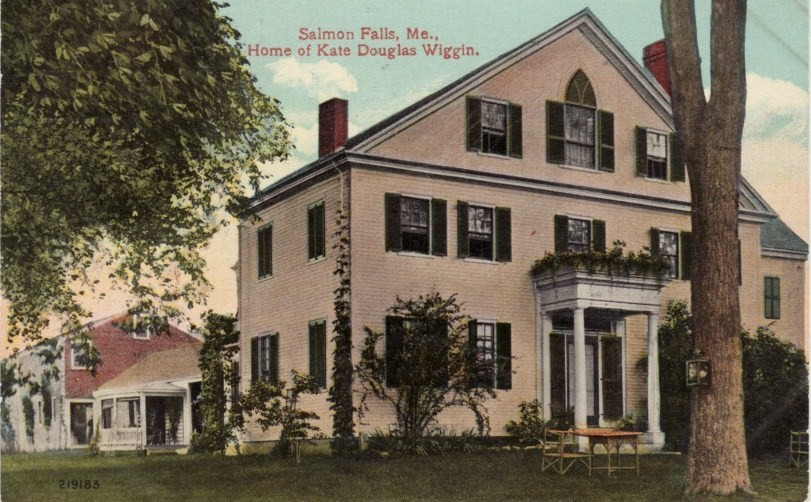
Kate Douglas Wiggin House in the Salmon Falls section of Hollis, Maine

Kate Douglas Smith Wiggin was born in Philadelphia, the daughter of lawyer Robert N. Smith, and of Welsh descent. Wiggin experienced a happy childhood, even though it was colored by the American Civil War and her father's death. She and her sister Nora were still quite young when their widowed mother moved her little family from Philadelphia to Portland, Maine, then, three years later, upon her remarriage, to the little village of Hollis. There she matured in rural surroundings, with her sister and her new baby brother Philip.

Notably, she once met the novelist Charles Dickens. Her mother and another relative had gone to hear Dickens read in Portland, but Wiggin, aged 11, was thought to be too young to warrant an expensive ticket. The following day, she found herself on the same train as Dickens and engaged him in a lively conversation for the course of the journey, an experience which she later detailed in a short memoir titled A Child's Journey with Dickens (1912).

Her education was spotty, consisting of a short stint at a dame school; some home schooling under the "capable, slightly impatient, somewhat sporadic" instruction of Albion Bradbury (her stepfather); a brief spell at the district school; a year as a boarder at the Gorham Female Seminary, a winter term at Morison Academy in Baltimore, Maryland; and a few months' stay at Abbot Academy in Andover, Massachusetts, where she graduated with the class of 1873. Although rather casual, this was more education than most women received at the time.

== Early career ==
In 1873, hoping to ease Albion Bradbury's lung disease, Wiggin's family moved to Santa Barbara, California, where her stepfather died three years later. A kindergarten training class was opening in Los Angeles under Emma Marwedel (1818–1893), and Wiggin enrolled. After graduation, in 1878, she headed the first free kindergarten in California, on Silver Street in the slums of San Francisco. The children were "street Arabs of the wildest type", but she had a loving personality and dramatic flair. By 1880 she was forming a teacher-training school in conjunction with the Silver Street kindergarten.

In 1881, she married (Samuel) Bradley Wiggin, a San Francisco lawyer. According to the customs of the time, she was required to resign her teaching job. Still devoted to her school, she began to raise money for it through writing, first The Story of Patsy (1883), then The Birds' Christmas Carol (1887). Both privately printed books were issued commercially by Houghton Mifflin in 1889, with enormous success.

Wiggin had no children. She moved to New York City in 1888. When her husband died suddenly in 1889, she relocated to Maine. For the rest of her life she grieved; but she also traveled as frequently as she could, dividing her time between writing, visits to Europe, and giving public reading for the benefit of various children's charities. She traveled abroad and back from Liverpool in the United Kingdom at least three times. Records from the Ellis Island logs show that she arrived back in New York City from Liverpool in October 1892, July 1893, and July 1894. On the logs for the 1892 trip, Wiggin describes her occupation as "wife", despite her former husband having died three years prior. In 1893 and 1894, she describes herself as an "authoress".

On her way to England in 1894, Wiggin met George Christopher Riggs, an importer of dry goods, specifically linen. The pair are said to have hit it off and to have agreed to marry even before the ship docked in England. In the Ellis Island logs from Wiggin's 1894 trip back to New York from Liverpool, the two signed their names next to each other, indicating their closeness. They married in New York City on March 30, 1895, at All Souls Church.

Riggs soon became one of Wiggin's biggest advocates as she became more successful. She continued to write under the name of Wiggin after the marriage. Her literary output included popular books for adults. With her sister, she published scholarly work on the educational principles of Friedrich Fröbel: Froebel's Gifts (1895), Froebel's Occupations (1896), and Kindergarten Principles and Practice (1896). In 1903 she wrote the classic children's novel Rebecca of Sunnybrook Farm, which became an immediate best-seller, as did Rose o' the River in 1905. Rebecca of Sunnybrook Farm and Mother Carey's Chickens (1911) were adapted to the stage. Houghton Mifflin collected Wiggin's writings in 10 volumes in 1917.

Wiggin was also a songwriter and composer. For "Kindergarten Chimes" (1885) and other collections for children, she wrote some of the lyrics, music, and arrangements. For "Nine Love Songs and a Carol", (1896), she composed all of the music.

For a time, Wiggin lived at Quillcote, her summer home in Hollis, Maine (now listed on the National Register of Historic Places). Quillcote is around the corner from the town library, the Salmon Falls Library, which she founded in 1911. She also founded a Dorcas Society in Hollis and the adjacent town of Buxton, Maine in 1897. The Tory Hill Meeting House in Buxton inspired her book (and later play) The Old Peabody Pew (1907).

== Later life and death ==
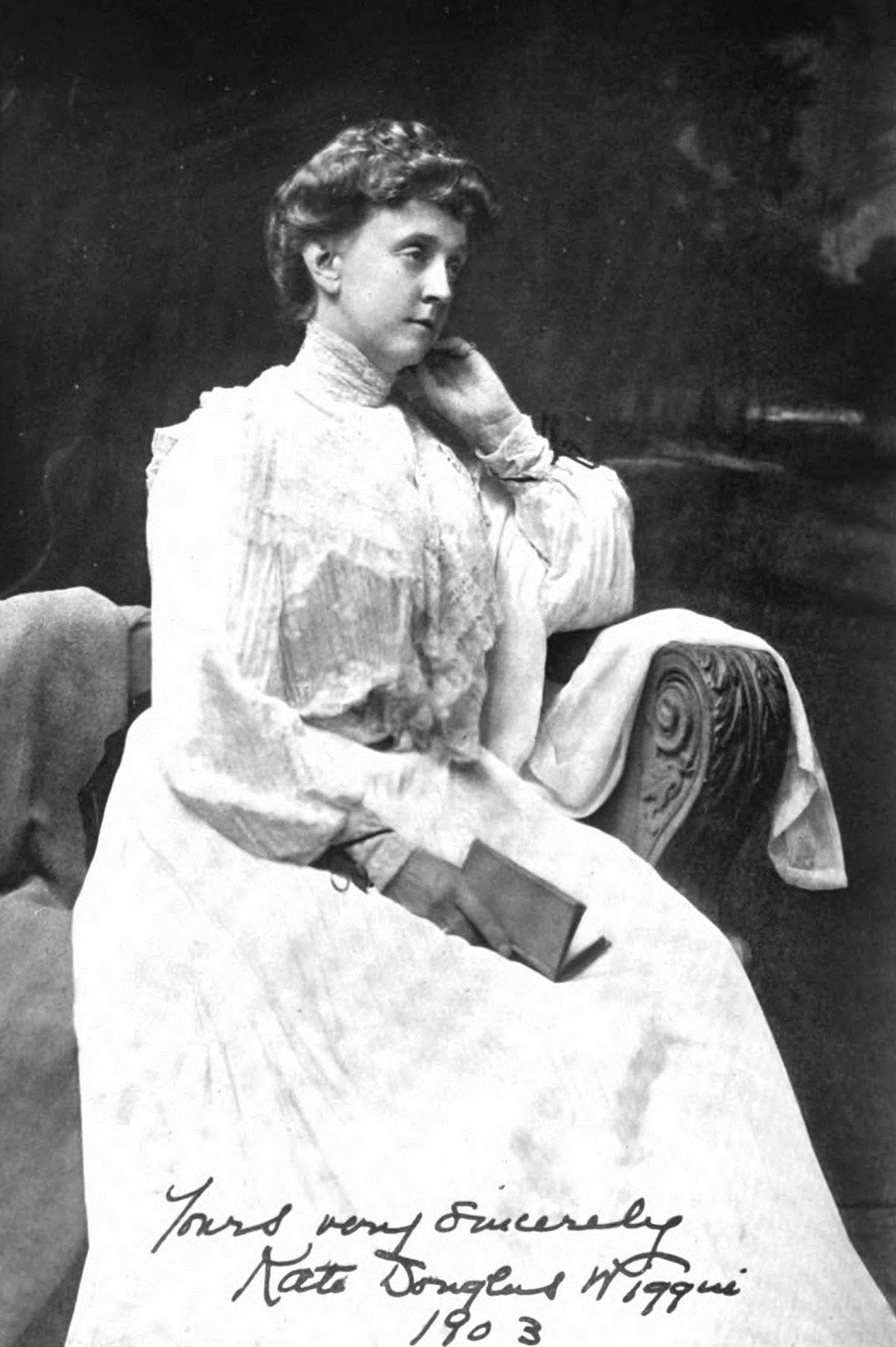
Photo of Wiggin (c. 1903)

Wiggin was an active and popular hostess in New York and in the community of Upper Largo, Scotland, where she had a summer home and where she organized plays for many years, as detailed in her autobiography My Garden of Memory.

Wiggin testified before a Congressional committee on women’s suffrage as an anti-suffragist. She stated that if women were as strong as they ought to be, they should be regularly consulted, to advise, collaborate, and contribute alongside men wherever their unique strengths were valuable. In her view, if women fully embraced and exercised these roles, they would not require the right to vote. Speaking to a group of anti-suffragists in Washington in April 1912, she added that she preferred women to be “strong enough to remain slightly in the background,” arguing that “the limelight never makes anything grow.” According to The Western Sentinel of Winston-Salem, North Carolina, Wiggin believed that it was “more difficult to be an inspiring woman than to be a good citizen or an honest voter.”

In 1921, she and her sister edited an edition of Jane Porter's The Scottish Chiefs, an 1810 novel of William Wallace, for the Scribner's Illustrated Classics series, illustrated by N.C. Wyeth. During the spring of 1923, Wiggin traveled to England as a New York delegate to the Dickens Fellowship. There she became ill and died, at age 66, of bronchial pneumonia. At her request, her ashes were brought home to Maine and scattered over the Saco River.

Wiggin's autobiography was published after her death. In sorting through material for it, she put many items in a box she and her sister labelled "posthumous", and from these materials her sister later published her own reminiscences of Wiggin, titled Kate Douglas Wiggin as Her Sister Knew Her.

== Legacy ==
In the 1980s and 1990s, Wiggin's first husband's distant cousin Eric E. Wiggin published updated versions of some of the books in her Rebecca of Sunnybrook Farm series. He later published his own addition to the series, entitled Rebecca Returns to Sunnybrook. Eric E. Wiggin extended her series after years of writing Christian literature, newspaper articles, and other children's books. His books sold best among his target audience of homeschoolers; with their help, his updated novels and his new addition to the series have sold more than 50,000 copies.

Many of Wiggin's novels were made into movies. Among them is the 1938 film Rebecca of Sunnybrook Farm (1938 film), starring Shirley Temple.

== Selected works ==
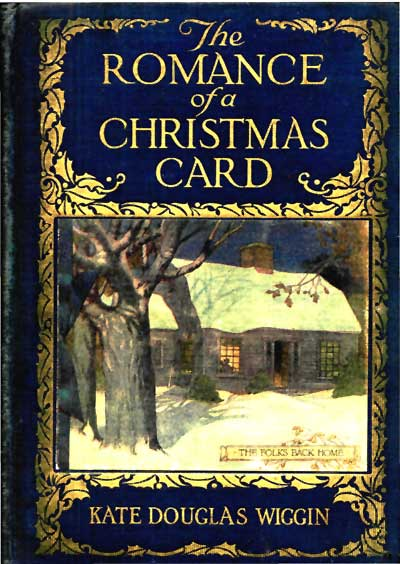
Cover of The Romance of a Christmas Card (1916)

- The Story of Patsy (1883)
- The Birds' Christmas Carol (1887)
- A Summer in a Canyon: A California Story (1889)
- Timothy's Quest (1890), illustrated by Oliver Herford
- Polly Oliver's Problem (1893)
- A Cathedral Courtship, and Penelope's English Experiences (1893)
- The Village Watch-Tower (1895)
- Penelope's Progress, also known as Penelope's Travels in Scotland (1898)
- Penelope's Irish Experiences (1901)
- The Diary of a Goose Girl (1902), illus. Claude A. Shepperson
- Rebecca of Sunnybrook Farm (1903)
- Half-a-Dozen Housekeepers (1903)
- Rose o' the River (1905)
- New Chronicles of Rebecca (1907)
- Homespun Tales (1907)
- The Old Peabody Pew (1907)
- Susanna and Sue (1909)
- Mother Carey's Chickens (1911)
- Robinetta (1911)
- Introduction to Diary of a Free Kindergarten by Lileen Hardy (1912)
- A Child's Journey with Dickens (1912)
- The Story of Waitstill Baxter (1913)
- The Romance of a Christmas Card (1916)
- Marm Lisa
- My Garden of Memory (autobiography, published posthumously in 1923)

=== With Nora A. Smith ===
- The Story Hour: a book for the home and kindergarten (1890), LCCN 14-19353
- Golden Numbers: a book of verse for youth, eds. (1902), LCCN 02-27230
- The Posy Ring: a book of verse for children, eds. (1903) – "companion volume", LCCN 03-5775
- The Fairy Ring, eds. (1906); truncated as Fairy Stories Every Child Should Know (1942), illus. Elizabeth MacKinstry LCCN 42-51972
- Magic Casements: A Second Fairy Book, eds. (1907)
- Pinafore Palace: a book of rhymes for the nursery, eds. (1907)
- Tales of Laughter: A Third Fairy Book, eds. (1908)
- The Arabian Nights: their best-known tales, eds. (1909), illus. Maxfield Parrish
- Tales of Wonder: A Fourth Fairy Book, eds. (1909)
- The Talking Beasts: a book of fable wisdom, eds. (1911)
- An Hour with the Fairies (1911)
- Twilight Stories: more tales for the story hour, eds. (1925), LCCN 25-17938
- The Story Hour. A Book for the Home and Kingergarten
- Children's Rights
- The Republic of Childhood (3 volumes)
- Marm Lisa

== Filmography ==
- A Bit o' Heaven (1917), directed by Lule Warrenton, based on the novel The Birds' Christmas Carol
- Rebecca of Sunnybrook Farm (1917), starring Mary Pickford, directed by Marshall Neilan (based on the novel Rebecca of Sunnybrook Farm)
- Rose o' the River (1919), directed by Robert Thornby (based on the novel Rose o' the River)
- Timothy's Quest (1922), directed by Sidney Olcott (based on the story Timothy's Quest)
- Rebecca of Sunnybrook Farm (1932), directed by Alfred Santell (based on the novel Rebecca of Sunnybrook Farm)
- Timothy's Quest (1936), directed by Charles Barton (based on the story Timothy's Quest)
- Rebecca of Sunnybrook Farm (1938), starring Shirley Temple, directed by Allan Dwan (based on the novel Rebecca of Sunnybrook Farm)
- Mother Carey's Chickens (1938), directed by Rowland V. Lee (based on the novel Mother Carey's Chickens)
- Summer Magic (1963), a Walt Disney production starring Hayley Mills, directed by James Neilson (based on the novel Mother Carey's Chickens)
- Christmas World: "The Bird's Christmas Carol" (2019), a Once Upon a Tale Entertainment presentation, directed by James Arrow (uncredited, based on her novel The Birds' Christmas Carol)
