= Rebecca of Sunnybrook Farm (1938 film) =

1938 film by Allan Dwan

- Theatrical release poster
- Directed by: Allan Dwan
- Screenplay by: Don Ettlinger; Karl Tunberg; Ben Markson; William M. Conselman
- Based on: Rebecca of Sunnybrook Farm; 1903 novel by Kate Douglas Wiggin
- Produced by: Darryl F. Zanuck; Raymond Griffith
- Starring: Shirley Temple; Randolph Scott; Jack Haley; Gloria Stuart; Phyllis Brooks; Helen Westley; Slim Summerville; Bill Robinson
- Cinematography: Arthur C. Miller
- Edited by: Allen McNeil
- Music by: Mack Gordon; Harry Revel; Lew Pollack; Sidney D. Mitchell; Samuel Pokrass; Jack Yellen; Raymond Scott
- Distributed by: Twentieth Century-Fox Film Corporation
- Release date: March 18, 1938
- Running time: 81 minutes
- Country: United States
- Language: English

Rebecca of Sunnybrook Farm is a 1938 American musical comedy film starring Shirley Temple, Randolph Scott, Jack Haley, Gloria Stuart, Phyllis Brooks, Helen Westley, Slim Summerville and Bill Robinson. The plot revolves around a talented orphan's trials and tribulations after winning a radio audition to represent a breakfast cereal in an ad campaign.

The film, directed by Allan Dwan and written by Don Ettlinger, Karl Tunberg, Ben Markson and William M. Conselman, is the third adaptation of Kate Douglas Wiggin's 1903 novel of the same name (previously done in 1917 and 1932). It is the second of three films in which Temple and Scott appeared together, between To the Last Man (1933) and Susannah of the Mounties (1939) and the second of two films in which Temple and Robinson appeared together, following Little Colonel in 1935.

== Plot ==
Rebecca and her stepfather Henry Kipper (William Demarest) are among a crowd of parents and daughters hoping to win a singing contest aimed at finding "Little Miss America." The winner will represent a cereal company in an advertising campaign. The first entrant has an unappealing voice; the second girl barely begins to sing before she is silenced by "mic fright".

To give Rebecca an edge, Henry attempts (unsuccessfully) to sweet-talk the station's receptionist, who is nevertheless charmed by Rebecca. While Rebecca sings, ad executive Tony Kent and the head of the cereal company listen on the radio and fall in love with Rebecca's voice. From his office, Tony tells his assistant Orville that he's heard enough - that is, he knows Rebecca is the contestant he wants. Misunderstanding Tony's meaning, Orville sends Rebecca and Henry away. Angered by Orville's error, Tony tells Orville to find Rebecca, but she and Henry have left the building.

Henry takes Rebecca to live with her Aunt Miranda at Sunnybrook Farm because he and Rebecca have (yet again) been evicted for non-payment of rent. Rebecca meets her aunt and her cousin Gwen at Sunnybrook, decides she loves the farm and never wants to leave. One day, she meets a new neighbor who happens to be Tony Kent, but neither knows who the other is as they had never met. Tony and Gwen seem to have chemistry, but Tony is seeing a singer, Lola Lee.

Rebecca and Tony become friends, and she visits him one day for lunch. Gwen stops by to retrieve her and is also persuaded to stay awhile. During the visit, Orville stops in to tell a furious Tony he's lost Rebecca. But then, as if by magic, Gwen plays the piano while Rebecca sings. Orville recognizes her voice and excitedly tells Tony "That's the girl," so the cereal campaign is saved. Unfortunately, Miranda is against Rebecca singing on the radio, and forbids her from doing so. Rebecca and Gwen devise a plan to do the transmission from Tony's home instead of from the city.

Lola Lee arrives late for rehearsal and realizes Tony has feelings for Gwen. Lola rebuffs the love-struck Orville, but they begin their rehearsal of "Alone With You" which transforms into the actual evening performance with orchestra. Tony's butler, Homer (Miranda's former fiancé) helps Rebecca get down from her second-story bedroom but knocks over the ladder when he tries to climb down, forcing him to stay in Rebecca's room.

Miranda hears the broadcast and thinks the girl singing sounds like Rebecca, but believes Rebecca is in her room. When Homer falls over by rocking too hard in a rocking chair, Miranda discovers him in the bedroom. Homer begs her forgiveness for missing their wedding 25 years earlier. She forgives him and allows Rebecca to continue to sing, but takes her straight home afterwards.

Henry and his new wife hear Rebecca singing on the radio and he gets a lawyer involved to claim guardianship over Rebecca so they can get rich. He forces Miranda to give up Rebecca, and devises to sell her singing contract to a rival company of Tony's.

Tony and Gwen find Rebecca at the local broadcast station and attempt to buy her contract for $100,000, but the rival executive refuses. When Rebecca tries to sing, her voice (intentionally) fails her and a doctor is called. He says she has laryngitis, but will be good as new after she rests for a year or more. The ad exec tears up the contract he had with Henry. Tony then offers Henry $5,000 to turn over his legal guardianship to Rebecca's aunt. Henry agrees and after they leave, Rebecca shows she was just pretending and her voice is fine.

The movie ends with Gwen and Tony, Lola Lee and Orville, and Miranda and Homer as couples, and Rebecca performs a military dance show on the stage.

== Cast ==
- Shirley Temple as Rebecca Winstead, a young orphan
- Randolph Scott as Tony Kent, a radio advertising executive
- William Demarest as Henry Kipper, Rebecca's stepfather
- Helen Westley as Miranda, a farm woman and Rebecca's aunt
- Gloria Stuart as Gwen, Rebecca's cousin and Kent's romantic interest
- Bill "Bojangles" Robinson as Aloysius, Miranda's farm hand
- Slim Summerville as Homer Busby, Miranda's old sweetheart
- Jack Haley as Orville Smithers, a radio performer
- Phyllis Brooks as Lola Lee, a radio performer
- Alan Dinehart as Purvis, Kent's competitor
- Franklin Pangborn as an organist at a radio station
- Paul Hurst as Florabelle's Father
- Mary McCarty as Florabelle
- J. Edward Bromberg as Dr. Hill
- Paul Harvey as Cyrus Bartlett, the cereal company executive
- Dixie Dunbar as receptionist

== Production ==
This movie is notable as the first movie in which Temple's mother did away with the trademark 56 curls for which Temple became famous. The new style with the long loose waves combed back was modeled to look closer to that of Mary Pickford, whom Temple's mother admired.

In the preparation for the film's finale (the "Toy Trumpet" dance number), Robinson joined Temple and her mother at the Desert Inn in Palm Springs to begin rehearsals. It was here that Temple had her first real encounter with the racism endured by Robinson, as he was forced to sleep in the chauffeurs' quarters as opposed to the cottages reserved for white guests.

At one point, preparations were made to include a drum sequence in the movie where Temple would play on the drums along with the musicians on the set. Temple befriended the studio drummer Johnny Williams, who taught her how to play the drums. Dwan, noticing her aptitude for the instrument, immediately ordered another drum set for her. Temple's mother, however, was strongly opposed to it, believing her sitting with legs apart was unladylike. The resulting sequence was later dropped, much to Temple's chagrin.

Temple's brother Jack Temple was hired as the movie's 3rd assistant director, to which as Shirley Temple would later say, he "spent time thinking up things to take care of, one of which was me." He was subsequently fired after he and Shirley Temple got into a dispute over a roasted turkey prop on the set. The turkey had been sprayed with insecticide to discourage insects, and her brother loudly ordered her not to eat the turkey, which she had no intention of doing. Out of spite, she popped the turkey in her mouth, prompting her brother to shake her to dislodge it. The spat did not sit well with the director Dwan, who ordered him off the set.

== Soundtrack ==
- Happy Endings
  - Music by Lew Pollack
  - Lyrics by Sidney D. Mitchell
  - Sung by Phyllis Brooks
- You've Gotta Eat Your Spinach, Baby
  - Music by Harry Revel
  - Lyrics by Mack Gordon
  - Sung by Mary McCarty
- An Old Straw Hat
  - Music by Harry Revel
  - Lyrics by Mack Gordon
  - Sung by Shirley Temple
- Crackly Grain Flakes
  - Music by Lew Pollack
  - Lyrics by Sidney D. Mitchell
  - Sung by Quartet
- Alone with You
  - Music by Lew Pollack
  - Lyrics by Sidney D. Mitchell
  - Sung by Phyllis Brooks and Jack Haley
- On the Good Ship Lollipop
  - Music by Richard A. Whiting
  - Lyrics by Sidney Clare
  - Sung as part of a medley by Shirley Temple
- Animal Crackers in My Soup
  - Music by Ray Henderson
  - Lyrics by Ted Koehler and Irving Caesar
  - Sung as part of a medley by Shirley Temple
- When I'm with You
  - Music by Harry Revel
  - Lyrics by Mack Gordon
  - Sung as part of a medley by Shirley Temple
- Oh My Goodness
  - Music by Harry Revel
  - Lyrics by Mack Gordon
  - Sung as part of a medley by Shirley Temple
- Goodnight My Love
  - Music by Harry Revel
  - Lyrics by Mack Gordon
  - Sung as part of a medley by Shirley Temple
- Parade of the Wooden Soldiers
  - Music by Leon Jessel
  - English lyrics by Ballard MacDonald
  - Arranged by Raymond Scott
  - Sung by Shirley Temple and Raymond Scott and His Quintet with Men's Chorus
  - Danced by Temple and Bill Robinson
- The Toy Trumpet
  - Music by Raymond Scott
  - Lyrics by Sidney D. Mitchell and Lew Pollack

== Release ==
=== Critical reception ===
Variety wrote, "The national No. 1 box office star has seldom shone so brilliantly in her singing, dancing and repartee. That means she is going right ahead to bigger and better grosses."

=== Accolades ===
The film is recognized by American Film Institute in these lists:

- 2006: AFI's Greatest Movie Musicals – Nominated

=== Home media ===
In 2009, the film was available on videocassette and DVD in the black and white original and computer-colorized versions. Some editions had special features and theatrical trailers.

== See also ==
- Shirley Temple filmography
