= Anna Taliaferro =

American theatrical agent

- Born: Anne M. Barriscale; March 1, 1871; England
- Died: January 5, 1917 (aged 45); New York City, New York, U. S.
- Occupation: Theatrical agent
- Years active: 1896–1906
- Spouses: Robert A. Taliaferro (m. 1886); James M. Abell (m. 1906–1917)
- Children: Mabel Taliaferro; Edith Taliaferro
- Relatives: Bessie Barriscale (niece)

Anna Taliaferro (born Anne M. Barriscale; March 1, 1871 – January 5, 1917) was a theatrical agent, who founded the first casting agency for stage children in America. She was the mother of actresses Mabel and Edith Taliaferro, and the aunt of Bessie Barriscale. She also trained other relatives for the stage, and had over 1000 children listed with her agency. Her agency, which provided training as well, was the subject of profiles in The New York Times and Leslie's Weekly. Among adult actors who went through her training as children were Grace and Helen Menken, Vivian Martin, and Gregory Kelly.

== Early years ==
She was born in England, and came to America during 1879. As Annie Barriscale, she married Robert A. Taliaferro (Note: The surname is pronounced like "Tolliver" in English.) on April 7, 1886, in Manhattan. According to her later testimony, he was a grocery store basket boy when they first met, and later worked at Acker Merral & Condit, a wine brokerage. Their first child, Maybelle "Mabel" Evelyne Taliaferro, was born May 21, 1887, in Manhattan. When the child was 10 weeks old in August 1887, Taliaferro deserted the family, going to Jacksonville, Florida where he worked in the store of his brother-in-law, John E. Clark. Anna Taliaferro, who blamed Clark for encouraging her husband to leave, visited the store in January 1888, and took a cowhide lash to Clark until he fled out the back door. She later gave an interview to a reporter from the Jacksonville News-Herald, concluding with "I will repeat the dose if necessary." The reporter added Anna Taliaferro was "of petite form, and a very intelligent and comely brunette".

Taliaferro and her errant husband returned to Manhattan, where their second child, Laura Edith Taliaferro, was born December 21, 1891. (Note: Many sources list a birthdate of 1894 and birthplace of Richmond, Virginia for Edith Taliaferro, but are contradicted by her christening document, which gives these details and her parentage.) The last public record of Robert Taliaferro in association with Anna and either of their children was when Edith was christened on March 20, 1892.

== Daughters' career beginnings ==
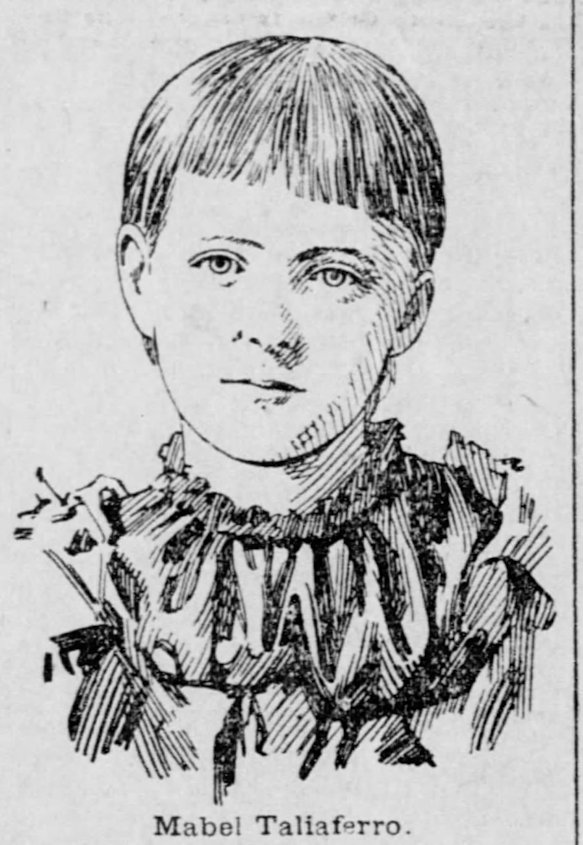
October 1894

After the Taliaferro sisters became well known actresses, there were publicity stories suggesting their family had a theatrical background. However, an article from 1899 said that aside from Mabel and Edith, there were no other players in their family. It quoted Mabel as saying she was the first to go on stage. That first stage experience occurred in 1892, when she appeared in a play called Blue Jeans. Mabel, in an October 1894 interview with a female reporter for The San Francisco Call & Post, said she was with Blue Jeans for two seasons. She was then currently appearing with the Katie Emmett Company in Killarney by Con T. Murphy. The interview implicitly stated Mabel's parents were not with her on the tour, but she regarded the other cast members as surrogates.

Edith Taliaferro began her stage career by temporarily replacing her ailing sister Mabel in Katie Emmett's Company during August 1895. She impressed everyone by knowing her sister's songs and lines by heart, having seen Mabel perform so often. She then had the good fortune to win a role with James A. Herne in his Shore Acres touring company during October 1895. Herne was an advocate of using great patience to help stage children seem natural when performing. (Note: His own daughters, Julie Herne and Chrystal Herne, did not start on the stage until they were in their teens.) Edith Taliferro stayed with Herne's company for two years. A short profile on the children with the tour contained answers about Edith's background that were plainly coming from her mother. Anna Taliaferro not only accompanied the tour, she also had coached and promoted her niece, Bessie Barriscale, (Note: Her first stage credits were as Lizzie Barriscale; she didn't switch to Bessie until 1901.) to fill a vacant part in the cast during November 1896.

== Theatrical agent ==
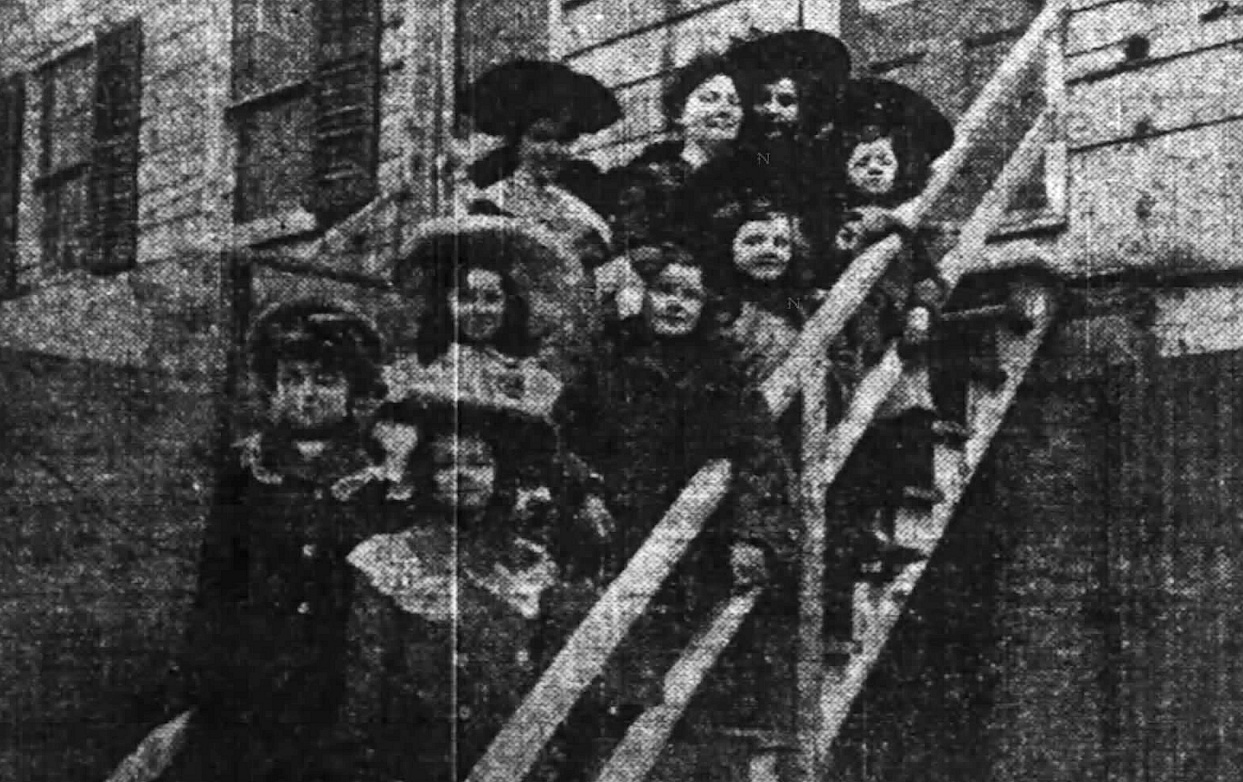

Whether her experience with the Herne tour was a catalyst or not, by 1899 Anna Taliaferro was an acknowledged theatrical agent for producers looking to cast children and teens for the theater. She had already "trained many children for the stage", and had successfully battled the Gerry Society's attempt to prevent Mabel from acting. Her agency was listed in the New York City Business Directory's Dramatics section under her own name, at 125 W. 40th Street. A reporter described the office as comprising two small rooms on the top floor of a little wooden building. The New York Times reporter referred to it as an "actor's market" for children, and said the kids coming to apply were "with their mothers, older sisters, guardians-- and not a few are boldly alone, armed with supreme confidence". Taliaferro did not advertise her agency, nor did it have a telephone. She operated through word-of-mouth when there were parts to be cast, suggesting new applicants visit her office at a certain date and time.

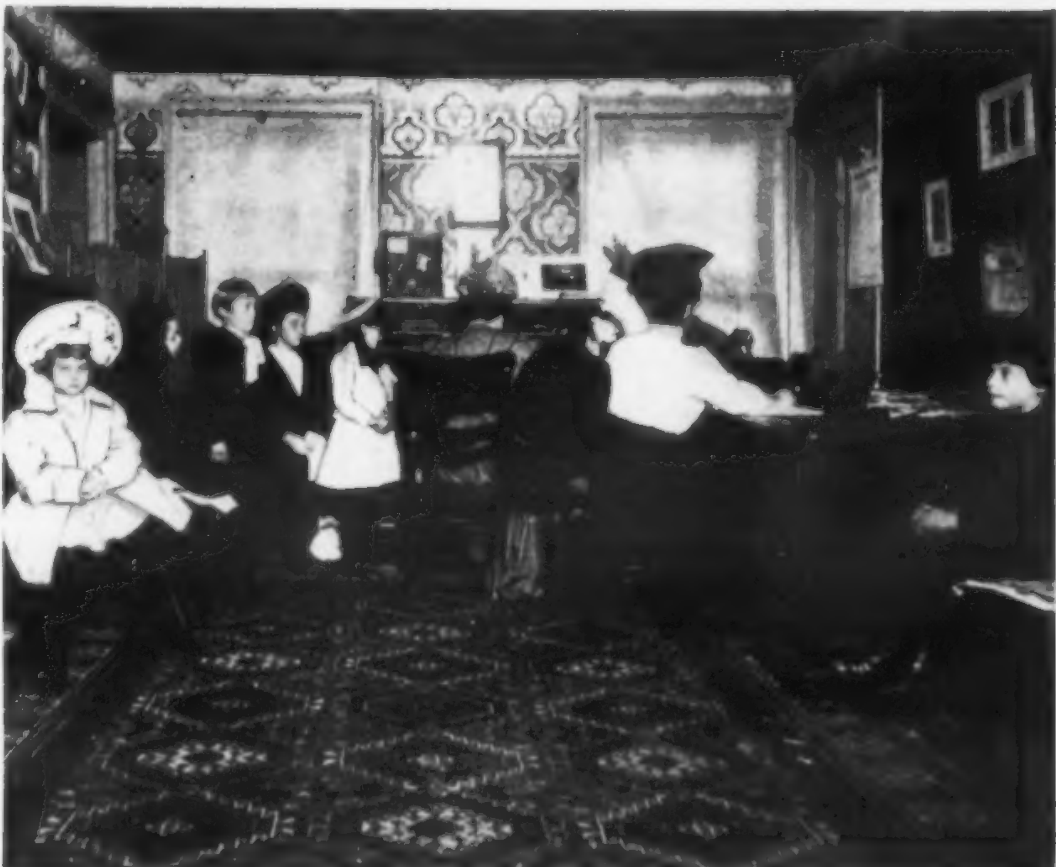

Harriet Quimby was drama critic for Leslie's Weekly when she interviewed Anna Taliaferro at her agency's office. Quimby recognized that the demand for children in stage works had increased from a few to hundreds within recent years.

=== Evaluating and training ===
Anna Taliaferro's first action upon meeting a new child was to make friends with them. They and their parent or guardian would meet with Taliaferro in her private office, where she could discern the child's suitability for the stage. Taliaferro would next stimulate the child's personality by relating an exciting story. Later, she would present suitable candidates for a production to its general manager in the outer office. The children were inevitably primed by their mothers with cute sayings to repeat during this interview. The manager whom The Times reporter witnessed was aware of this; he pressed the children with questions until they ran out of or forgot the prepared remarks, at which point their real personalities could be seen.

Quimby asked Taliaferro how many children she saw per day. Taliaferro replied about a hundred on average: "It is no easy task to talk to each one and to find out his or her capabilities and limitations, but I enjoy it. I never have any trouble with the children, but the mothers are sometimes hard to handle."

Actress Grace Menken recalled many years later being sent to Anna Taliaferro's agency as a child along with her sister Helen Menken. They were given training in "deportment and the rudiments of ballet", before Grace was sent to her first professional job for Ned Wayburn, at $4 a week. Other actors who went through the agency as kids were Vivian Martin and Gregory Kelly, who later found Broadway success with Ruth Gordon in Seventeen.

=== The Gerries ===
The children who went through the Taliaferro agency picked up a certain apprehension about the Gerry Society, which sought to prevent them from working as actors. One story recounted that a child, when asked their age, replied: "Five for the street car conductor, seven for mamma, and ten for 'the Gerries'". The Times reporter said a visitor to the agency thought the kids were referring to a contagious disease from the way they said the word.

By 1906, the Gerry Society had succeeded in prohibiting children under seven from performing on stage in New York. Those under sixteen were not allowed to dance on stage, though as Taliaferro explained to Harriet Quimby, there was nothing to stop them from skipping.

== Later life ==
How long Anna Taliaferro's theatrical agency continued is unknown. She married James M. Abell, a real estate investor and hotel proprietor from Long Beach, New York. She and her daughter Mabel formed the Hotel Abell Company of Long Beach in New York during 1911. The following year she filed a lawsuit on behalf of her daughter Edith over claims she had given a moonlight ride in her automobile to a married man.

She died January 5, 1917, at St. Vincent's Hospital, reportedly after a short illness. Despite this, her daughter Edith completed her role in Captain Kidd, Jr. at the Cohan & Harris Theatre that same night.
