= The $1,000,000 Reward =

1920 film by George Lessey

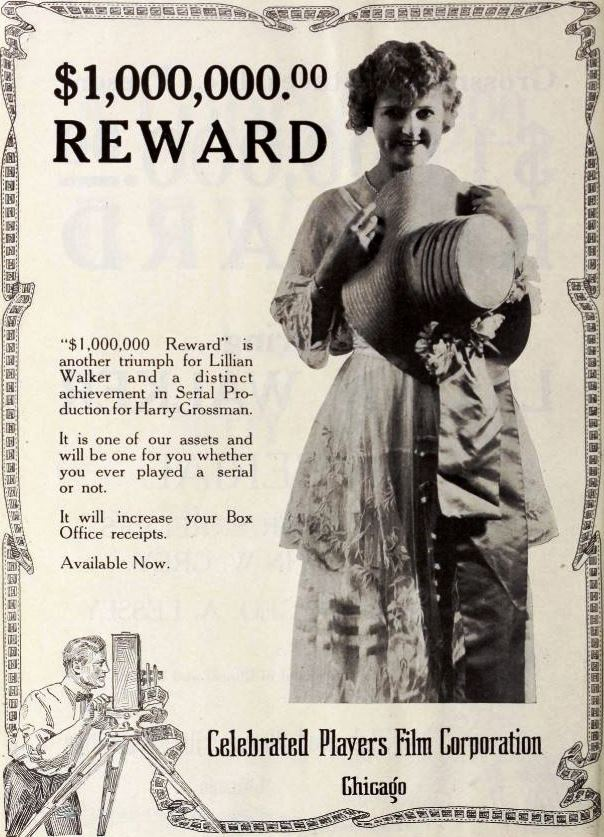
- Advertisement for film
- Directed by: George Lessey
- Produced by: Harry Grossman
- Starring: Coit Albertson
- Distributed by: Grossman Pictures
- Release date: January 1920
- Running time: 15 episodes
- Country: United States
- Language: Silent (English intertitles)

The $1,000,000 Reward is a 1920 American drama serial film directed by George Lessey and produced by Harry Grossman. This is now considered to be a lost film, as there are no available copies of it.

== Cast ==
- Lillian Walker as Betty Thorndyke
- Coit Albertson as Morgan Spencer
- Charles B. Middleton as William Russell
- George Lessey as James Bradley (credited as George A. Lessey)
- Joe Smith Marba as Kenwah (credited as Joseph Marba)
- Leora Spellman as Valerie Kernan
- Bernard Randall as Kip Van Hoan
- William Pike as James Forsythe
- Buck Connors (credited as George Connors)
- Louise Hotaling
- Ray Allen
- Herbert Rawlinson as Man in suit
- F.W. Stewart

== See also ==
- List of American films of 1920
- List of film serials
- List of film serials by studio
- List of lost films
