= Edith Taliaferro =

American actress (1894–1958)

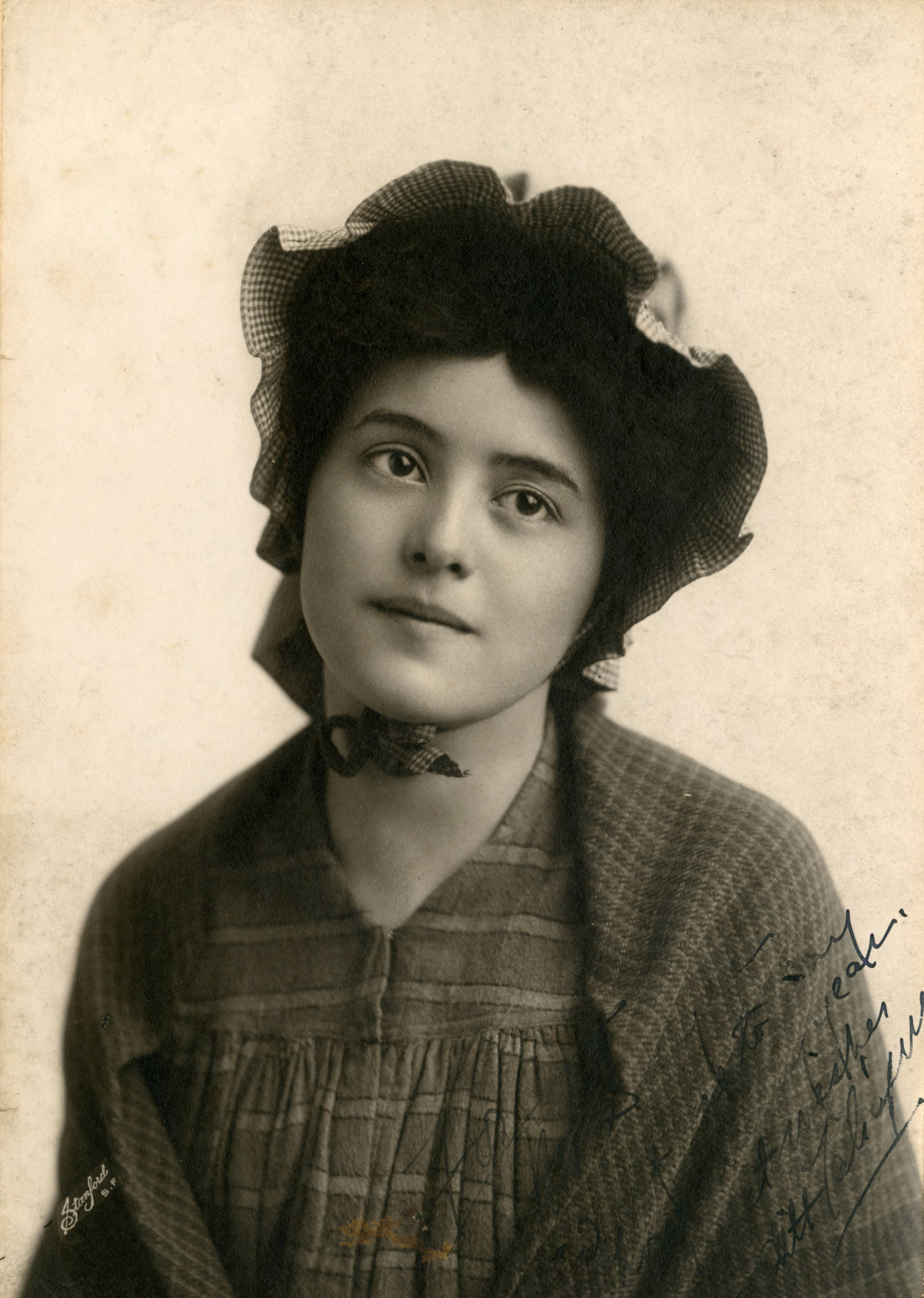
- Taliaferro in 1907
- Born: Laura Edith Taliaferro; December 21, 1891; Manhattan, New York, U.S.
- Died: March 2, 1958 (aged 66); Newtown, Connecticut, U.S.
- Occupation: Actress
- Years active: 1896–1935
- Spouses: Earl Browne (divorced); House B. Jameson (m. 1928)
- Parent: Anna Taliaferro
- Relatives: Mabel Taliaferro (sister); Bessie Barriscale (cousin)

Edith Taliaferro (December 21, 1891 – March 2, 1958) was an American stage and film actress of the late 19th and early 20th centuries. She was active on the stage until 1935 and had roles in three silent films. She is best known for portraying the role of Rebecca in the 1910 stage production of Rebecca of Sunnybrook Farm.

== Early life and family ==
Laura Edith Taliaferro (Note: The surname is pronounced like "Tolliver" in English.) was born in Manhattan, the daughter of Anna Barriscale Taliaferro and Robert A. Taliaferro. (Note: Many sources list a birthdate of 1894 and birthplace of Richmond, Virginia for Edith Taliaferro, but are contradicted by her christening document, which gives these details and her parentage.) She was the younger sister of Mabel Taliaferro who also became a stage actress, and the cousin of actress Bessie Barriscale. Her paternal ancestors were originally from England, of remote Italian descent (from the 1500s). They were one of the families who settled in Virginia in the 17th century.

== Career ==
=== Early years ===
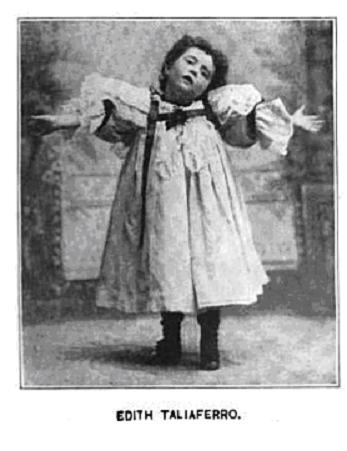
Taliaferro in Metropolitan Magazine, January 1899

Edith Taliaferro began her stage career by temporarily replacing her ailing sister Mabel in Katie Emmett's Company during August 1895. She impressed everyone by knowing her sister's songs and lines by heart, having seen Mabel perform so often. She then had the good fortune to win a role with James A. Herne in his Shore Acres touring company during October 1895. It was rumored that she obtained the part because her sister Mabel was too old to depict the character. Her Broadway debut came in 1900 with the play The Sunken Bell.

Newspapers reported during June 1904 that Taliaferro was signed to a personal contract and paid $100 per week by George C. Tyler of Liebler & Company. She signed a contract for the following season to appear with Ezra Kendall. She was the youngest Shakesperean actress on the stage. She portrayed Puck in a Ben Greet production of A Midsummer Night's Dream before an audience at Princeton University in May 1904. She was lauded by professors there, and they sent her a Princeton University flag and pin. By then, she had performed in six to eight juvenile roles after her professional debut. When she returned to New York, Taliaferro appeared with Clara Bloodgood in The Girl with the Green Eyes.

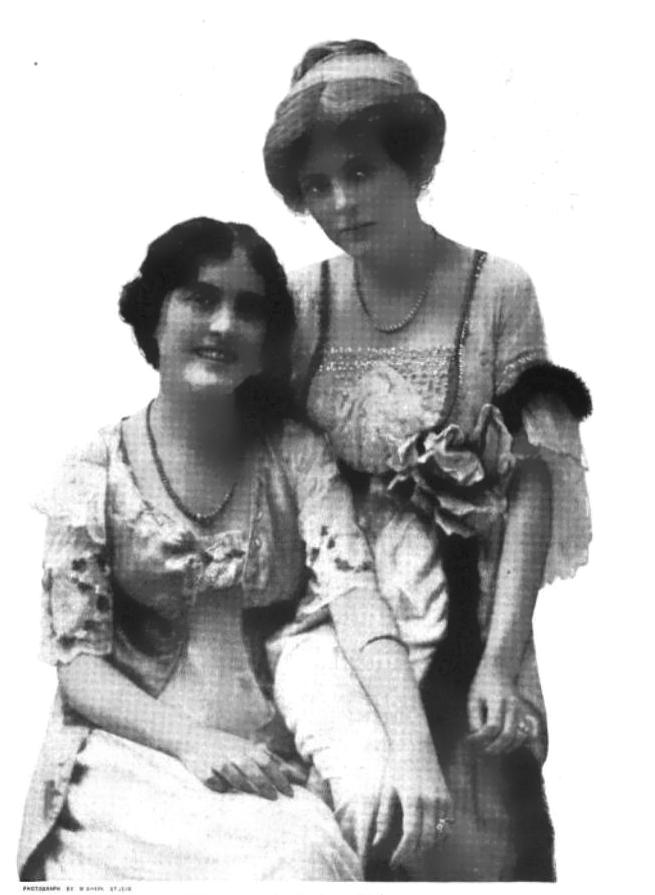
Edith Taliaferro (right), with her sister Mabel in 1913.

In 1907, Frederic Thompson produced Polly of the Circus, written by Margaret Mayo, for his new wife Mabel Taliaferro, and at times during its run, Edith took on the lead role of the youthful circus rider in her sister's place.

She is most noted for her 1910 performance in Rebecca of Sunnybrook Farm. It was staged at the Republic Theater, 209 West 42nd Street. Her other successful theatrical performances include roles in Young Wisdom (1914), Tipping The Winner (1914), and Mother Carey's Chickens (1917).

=== Films, later career and retirement ===
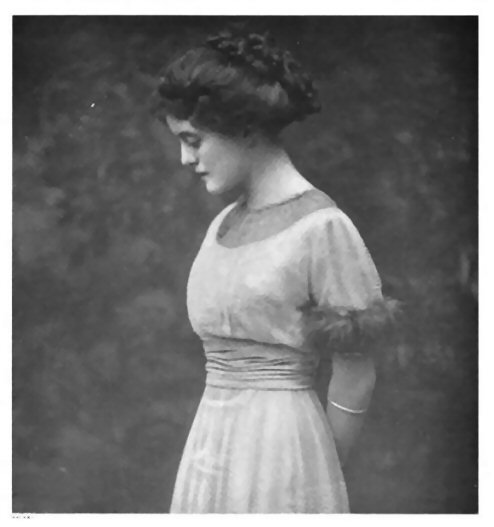
Edith Taliaferro age 17

Taliaferro made her silent film debut in Young Romance in 1915. That same summer of 1915 Taliaferro appeared as part of the summer stock cast at the Elitch Theatre. She made only two more films, The Conquest of Canaan (1916) and Who's Your Brother? (1919). She returned to Broadway in 1919 in Please Get Married followed by roles in Kissing Time (1920), A Love Scandal (1923), and as "Amanda Prynne" in the touring company production of Private Lives in 1931. She performed in London, England and in Australia with the Toronto Theatre Guild. In vaudeville she appeared at the Palace Theater in New York City. Most of her later work was with summer theaters and on radio. Taliaferro retired from stage work in the late 1930s after she lost her vision.

== Personal life ==
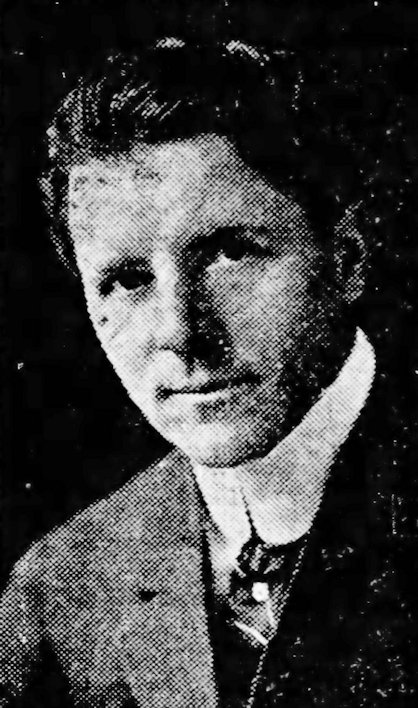
Earle Browne 1912

Taliaferro married actor Earle Browne on June 4, 1912, in York, Ontario, where he was appearing in A Night Off at the Royal Alexandria Theatre in Toronto. The marriage was public knowledge by May 1913. Taliaferro's second husband was actor House B. Jameson, whom she married around 1928. Jameson appeared in various stage productions and later became known for his role as Sam "Papa" Aldrich on the radio and television series The Aldrich Family. The couple had no children and remained married until Taliaferro's death.

== Death ==
On March 2, 1958, Edith Taliaferro died at age 63 from undisclosed causes at her home in Newtown, Connecticut.

== Stage performances ==
By year of Edith Taliaferro's first performance in the work
Year	Play	Role	Venue	Notes
1896	Shore Acres	Millie Berry	Touring company	Two newspapers reported her as being 4-years-old during this production, in contrast to later secondary sources which claimed she was only two.
1900	The Sunken Bell	Second Boy	Knickerbocker Theatre	This was an English translation by a "Mr. Meltzer", that starred E. H. Sothern and Virginia Harned.
1901	The Bonnie Brier Bush	Jeannie	Touring company/Theatre Republic	Loosely adapted from Ian Maclaren's Beside the Bonnie Brier Bush.
1902	The Girl with the Green Eyes	Susie	Savoy Theatre/Touring Company	Taliaferro is a "slangy little sister" to Clara Bloodgood, in this play written by Clyde Fitch.
1904	Uncle Tom's Cabin	Eva	Chestnut Street Opera House	
1904	A Midsummer Night's Dream	Puck	Princeton University	An outdoor one-night Ben Greet production, it would also play other universities.
1904	Mrs. Wiggs of the Cabbage Patch	Australia Wiggs	Grand Opera House	She took Edith Storey's place temporarily, from July 10 thru August 6.
1904	Weatherbeaten Benson	Little Miss Moses	Touring company	Liebler & Company three-act comedy by Ezra Kendall who also starred in it.
1906	Mrs. Wiggs of the Cabbage Patch	Lovey Mary	New York Theatre/Touring company	This revival played three weeks on Broadway then went on tour.
1907	The Evangelist (Note: The first tryouts were given as The Galilean's Victory; by the time the play reached Broadway the title had been changed.)	Ione Nuneham	Knickerbocker Theatre	Taliaferro played a "precocious child". This was made into a 1916 silent film.
1907	Marta of the Lowlands	Muri	Touring company	This starred Bertha Kalich, who later reprised her role in a 1914 silent film.
1908	Polly of the Circus	Polly	Liberty Theatre	Although the play debuted in 1907, Edith Taliaferro didn't start subbing for her sister Mabel until February 1908.
1908	Brewster's Millions	Peggy Gray	McVicker's Theater	Chicago reviewer Charles W. Collins gave a profile of her family and mentioned she "wasn't more than 17 or 18".
1908	Polly of the Circus	Polly	Touring company	She led the second company but had to replace her sister Mabel in the first due to appendicitis.
1910	Rebecca of Sunnybrook Farm	Rebecca	Touring company/Republic Theatre	The play debuted at the Tremont Theatre, then toured until its Broadway premiere in October.
1914	Young Wisdom	Gail Claffenden	Criterion Theatre/Touring company	The Taliaferro sisters had joint top billing in this three-act comedy satire by Rachel Crothers.
1914	Tipping the Winner	Dorothy Gay	Longacre Theatre	Taliaferro had top billing in this comedy by George Rollit, described as an English "racing farce" in three acts, adapted by Richard Norton.
1915	A Breath of Old Virginia	Mary Davis	Palace Theatre	Taliaferro's first vaudeville appearance was this one-act play set during the Civil War.
1916	Captain Kidd, Jr.	Mary MacTavish	Cohan & Harris Theatre	Called Buried Treasure during tryouts, this Rida Johnson Young three-act comedy was made into a 1919 silent film.
1917	Mother Carey's Chickens	Nancy Carey	Touring company/Cort Theater	John Cort production based on the 1911 novel by Kate Douglas Wiggin with dramatic help from Rachel Crothers.
1918	The Best Sellers (Note: Written by Kenneth and Roy Webb, this was one of five playlets presented by Actors and Authors, Inc. during June 1918.)	Queen Wilhelmina/Lady Clare/Faro Kate	Fulton Theatre	Taliaferro plays three damsels rescued in three "books" (scenes) of this one-act satire of popular romances.
1919	Please Get Married	Muriel Ashley	Little Theatre	Taliaferro was second billed to Ernest Truex in this farce, which was made into a silent film that same year.
1920	Kissing Time	Clarice	Lyric Theatre	Taliaferro shared lead billing with William Norris in this updated two-act musical revival.
1923	Fashions of 1924	Neil Barton	Lyceum Theatre	Nunnally Johnson panned this musical revue as a "dressmaker's show", disparaging the songs and lyrics.
1923	A Love Scandal	Bettina Tilton	Comedy Theatre	Taliaferro had lead billing at first tryout, but was demoted to distant second billing to Norman Trevor on Broadway.
1924	Tarnish	Tishy	Majestic Theatre	Brooklyn revival of 1923 Broadway drama by Gilbert Emery had already been released as a silent film.
1925	The Bride Retires! (Note: IBDb has this without the exclamation point, which contemporaneous newspapers used.)	Raymonde	National Theatre	Taliaferro took over the female lead for the September reopening of this comedy.
1930	(Various stock plays)	(Misc roles)	Touring Company	Taliaferro and her husband House Jameson performed six plays in Sydney and Melbourne with their own stock company.
1931	Dishonored Lady	Madeline Cary	Touring company	Taliaferro joined the Bainbridge Players to star in two week-long productions in various cities.
1931	Peg o' My Heart	Peg	Touring company	Another stock play performed by the Bainbridge Players.
1931	Private Lives	Amanda Prynne	Touring company	Taliaferro led the second of four touring companies for this Broadway hit.
1935	The Hook-Up	Mary Bainbridge	Cort Theatre	A satirical farce on radio advertising; Taliaferro plays the sweet colleague whom Ernest Truex really loves.

== Filmography ==
Year	Title	Role	Notes
1915	Young Romance	Nellie Nolan	
1916	The Conquest of Canaan	Ariel Tabor	
1919	Who's Your Brother?	Esther Field	Alternative title: Keep [It] to the Right.

== Bibliography ==
- "Theater Talk". Mansfield News. April 16, 1909. p. 7.
- "Theatres". The New York Times. October 10, 1897. p. 5.
- "Ten Years Old; $100 A Week". The New York Times. May 24, 1904. p. 9.
- "Edith Taliaferro Of Stage, Was 64". The New York Times. March 3, 1958. p. 27.
- "Wieting-Polly of the Circus". Syracuse Herald-Journal. November 15, 1908. p. 30.
