= The Substitute Wife =

The Substitute Wife may refer to:

- The Substitute Wife (1925 film), an American silent drama directed by Wilfred Noy
- The Substitute Wife (1994 film), a television film directed by Stan Daniels

== See also ==
- Substitute Wife, a 1936 Finnish romantic comedy film directed by Valentin Vaala
