= Young Romance (film) =

1915 American silent romance film directed by George Melford

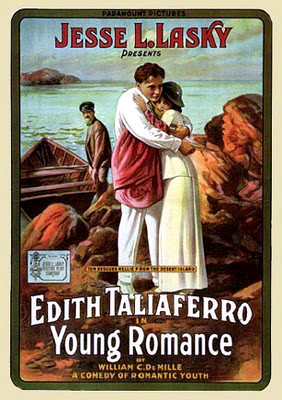
- Film poster
- Directed by: George Melford
- Screenplay by: William C. deMille
- Based on: Young Romance by William C. deMille
- Produced by: George Melford
- Starring: Edith Taliaferro; Tom Forman
- Cinematography: Walter Stradling
- Production company: Jesse L. Lasky Feature Play Company
- Distributed by: Paramount Pictures; Famous Players–Lasky
- Release date: January 21, 1915
- Running time: 59 minutes
- Country: United States
- Language: Silent (English intertitles)

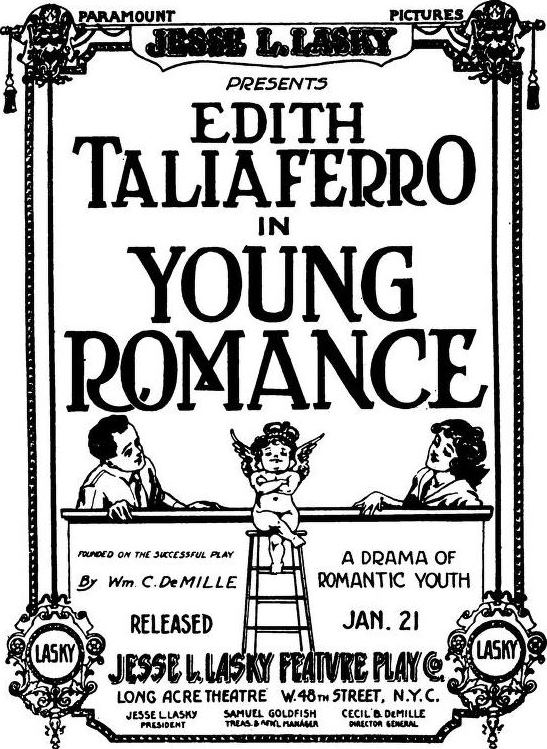
Advertisement.

Young Romance is a 1915 American silent romance film directed and produced by George Melford. The film is based on the play of the same name by William C. deMille who also wrote the screenplay. Edith Taliaferro, who made only three films in her career, stars in this film which is the only one of her films that still exists.

== Plot ==
It is a silent film about two young people who work as department store clerks and end up going to a high end masquerade pretending to fit in. Intending to find a wealthy spouse, they end up falling in love with each other instead. Without knowing who the other is, this silent film shows how they navigate through getting to know each other and falling in love without knowing who the other person is.

== Cast ==
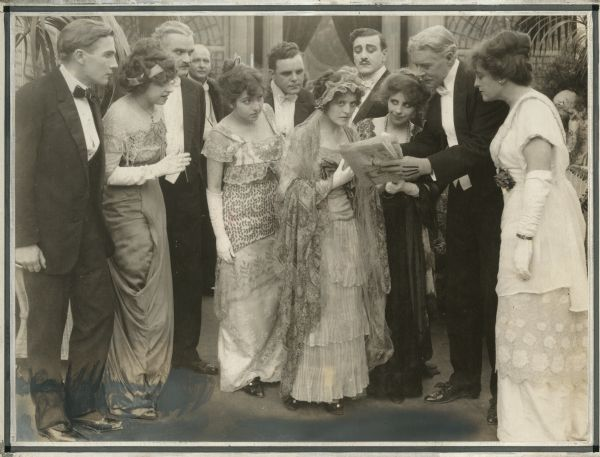
Scene still featuring Nellie Nolan (Edith Taliaferro) who learns that the person she is impersonating has just inherited a fortune. Behind her, the criminal Spagnoli (Al Ernest Garcia wearing a small dark moustache) begins to plot.

- Edith Taliaferro as Nellie Nolan
- Tom Forman as Tom Clancy
- Al Garcia as Count Spagnoli
- Raymond Hatton as Jack
- Florence Dagmar as Lou
- Charles Wells as Motor boatman/chauffeur
- Mrs. Lewis McCord as Landlady
- Marshall Mackaye as Bell Boy
- Harry De Vere as Sila Jenkins
- J. Parks Jones as Young Jenkins
- Violet Drew as Telegraph operator
- Gertrude Kellar as Mrs. Jenkins

== Home media ==
Young Romance was released on DVD by Image Entertainment along with Raoul Walsh's Regeneration.
