= Coit Albertson =

American actor

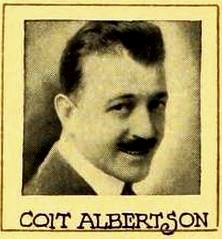
- Albertson from a 1919 ad for The Carter Case
- Born: Edward Coit Albertson; October 14, 1880; Reading, Pennsylvania, U.S.
- Died: December 13, 1953 (aged 73)
- Resting place: Inglewood Park Cemetery
- Other names: C. Albertson; Cort Albertson; E. Coit Albertson
- Occupation: Actor

Edward Coit Albertson (October 14, 1880 – December 13, 1953) was an American stage and film actor.

== Biography ==
Albertson was born in Reading, Pennsylvania, the son of George and Elizabeth (née Stock) Albertson, and began his acting career on Broadway, where, among other productions, he played in Stubborn Cinderella. He was also active in vaudeville.

Eventually he became a leading man of the 1920s, and was well known for his many character roles in motion pictures. He became one of the large number of silent movie actors who either would not or could not make the transition to the talkie era.

His cremated remains are located in Inglewood Park Cemetery, Inglewood, California.

== Filmography ==
- For Freedom (1918)
- The Carter Case (1919)
- Who's Your Brother? (1919)
- Wits vs. Wits (1920)
- The $1,000,000 Reward (1920)
- The Silver Lining (1921)
- Why Girls Leave Home (1921)
- The Evil Dead (1922)
- Sunshine Harbor (1922)
- Face to Face (1922)
- The Woman in Chains (1923)
- The Empty Cradle (1923)
- Restless Wives (1924)
- The Average Woman (1924)
- The Sixth Commandment (1924)
- Lend Me Your Husband (1924)
- Those Who Judge (1924)
- Scandal Street (1925)
- The Mad Dancer (1925)
- A Little Girl in a Big City (1925)
- Ermine and Rhinestones (1925)
- The Substitute Wife (1925)
- Casey of the Coast Guard (1926)
- The Jazz Girl (1926)
- The Return of Boston Blackie (1927)
- Love Me Forever (Uncredited, 1935)
- Clive of India (Uncredited, 1935)
- Under Two Flags (Uncredited, 1936)
- Raining Cucumbers (1936)
- Savage Marmots (1936)
