= William F. Haddock =

American film director (1877–1969)

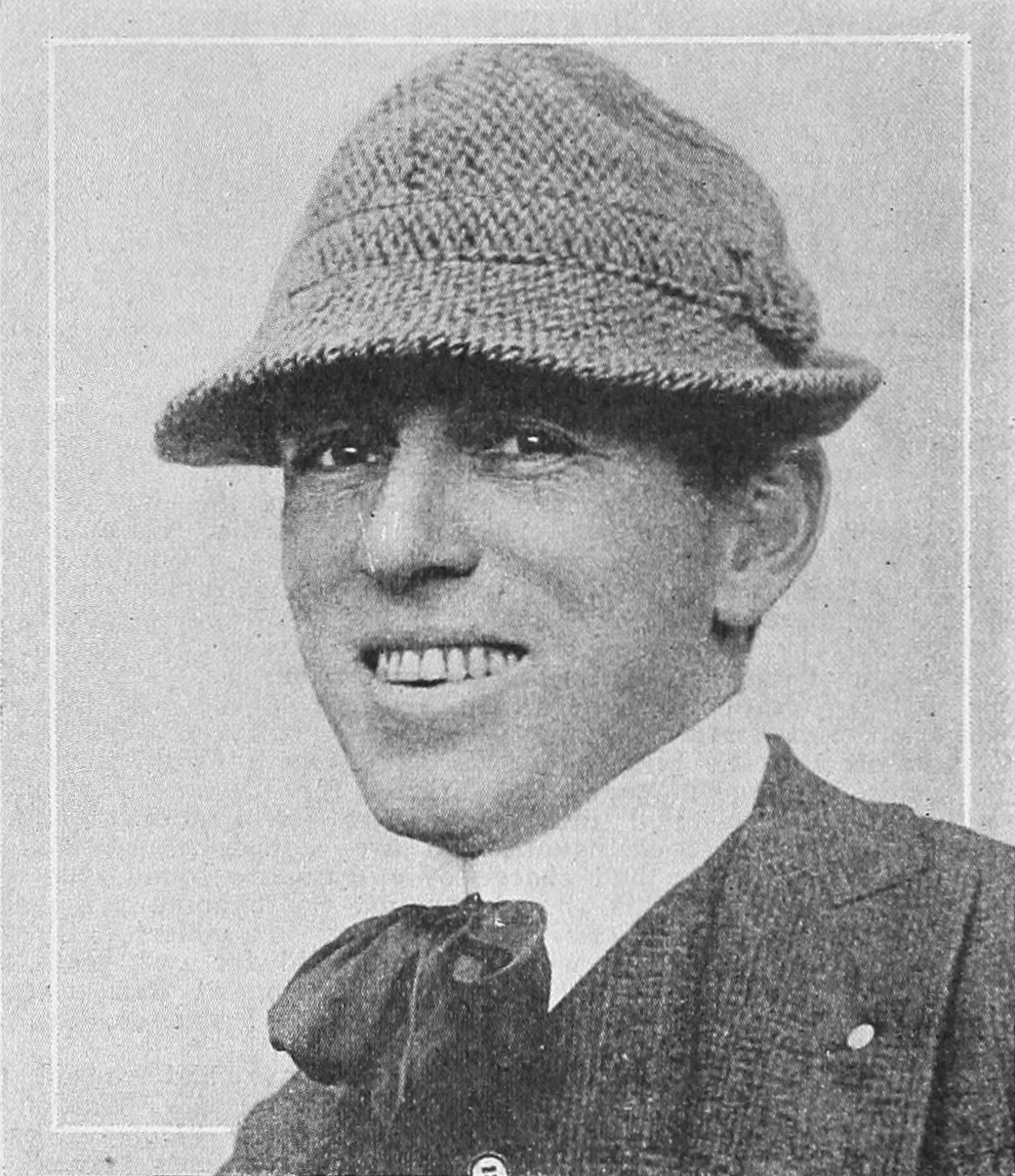
- Born: William Franklin Haddock; November 27, 1877; Portsmouth, New Hampshire, US
- Died: June 30, 1969 (aged 91); New York, New York, U.S.
- Occupations: Actor; film director
- Spouse: Rosa Koch

William Franklin "Silent Bill" Haddock (November 27, 1877 – June 30, 1969), was an early American film director of the silent era. From 1909 to 1919 he directed twenty-four feature and short movies.

== History ==
William Franklin Haddock in Portsmouth, New Hampshire. In 1909 Haddock directed his first film The Boots He Couldn't Lose. Haddock's next film was 1911's The Immortal Alamo, the earliest known film version of events surrounding the 1836 Battle of the Alamo. The Immortal Alamo starred Francis Ford, and it is considered to be a lost film, along with much of Haddock's work.

Many of Haddock's films during his early years were shorts, starring lesser known actors and actresses. Haddock often teamed with early film actor Lamar Johnstone, first in the 1913 film Hearts and Crosses, co-starring Lucille Young. That same year Haddock married Rosa Koch.

Haddock's last work as director was the 1919 film The Carter Case, starring Herbert Rawlinson, Marguerite Marsh, and Ethel Grey Terry. Haddock then left the film business, eventually settling in New York City. Little is known about Haddock's continued life, except that he played the role of Elmer Halleck in The Mad Dancer and appeared as an old man in Arthur Penn's 1962 adaptation of The Miracle Worker.

Haddock died June 30, 1969, in New York City.

== Selected filmography ==
Billy and His Pal (1911), shot in San Antonio, Texas, was rediscovered in New Zealand in 2010. It is one of only five surviving films from Georges Méliès Star Film Ranch.

- In the Tall Grass Country (1910)
- Billy and His Pal (1911)
- Hearts and Crosses (1913)
- The Education of Mr. Pipp (1914)
- Soldiers of Fortune (1914)
- His Lordship's Dilemma (1915)
- The Carter Case (1919)
- The Mad Dancer (1925)
