= Mary Imlay Taylor =

American novelist

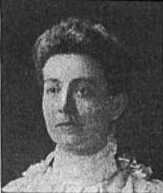
- Born: April 11, 1866; Washington, D.C.
- Died: August 27, 1938 (aged 72); Miami
- Occupation: Writer

Mary Imlay Taylor (April 11, 1866 – August 28, 1938) was an American novelist and short story writer.

Mary Imlay Taylor was born on April 11, 1866 in Washington, D.C., the daughter of George Taylor and Eleanor Imlay Taylor.

Taylor published almost two dozen novels. Many of her works were historical fiction: A Yankee Volunteer (1899) is set during the American Revolution, On the Red Staircase (1896) and An Imperial Lover (1897) depicts Peter the Great, and The House of the Wizard (1899) features Henry VIII and his first two wives, with the addition of an evil wizard. She also frequently published short stories and serials in numerous publications, including Munsey's Magazine and Argosy. A number of films were based on her works, including The Tenderfoot's Money (1913), Putting One Over (1919), and Conquest (1928).

Mary Imlay Taylor died on 28 August 1938 in Miami.

== Bibliography ==
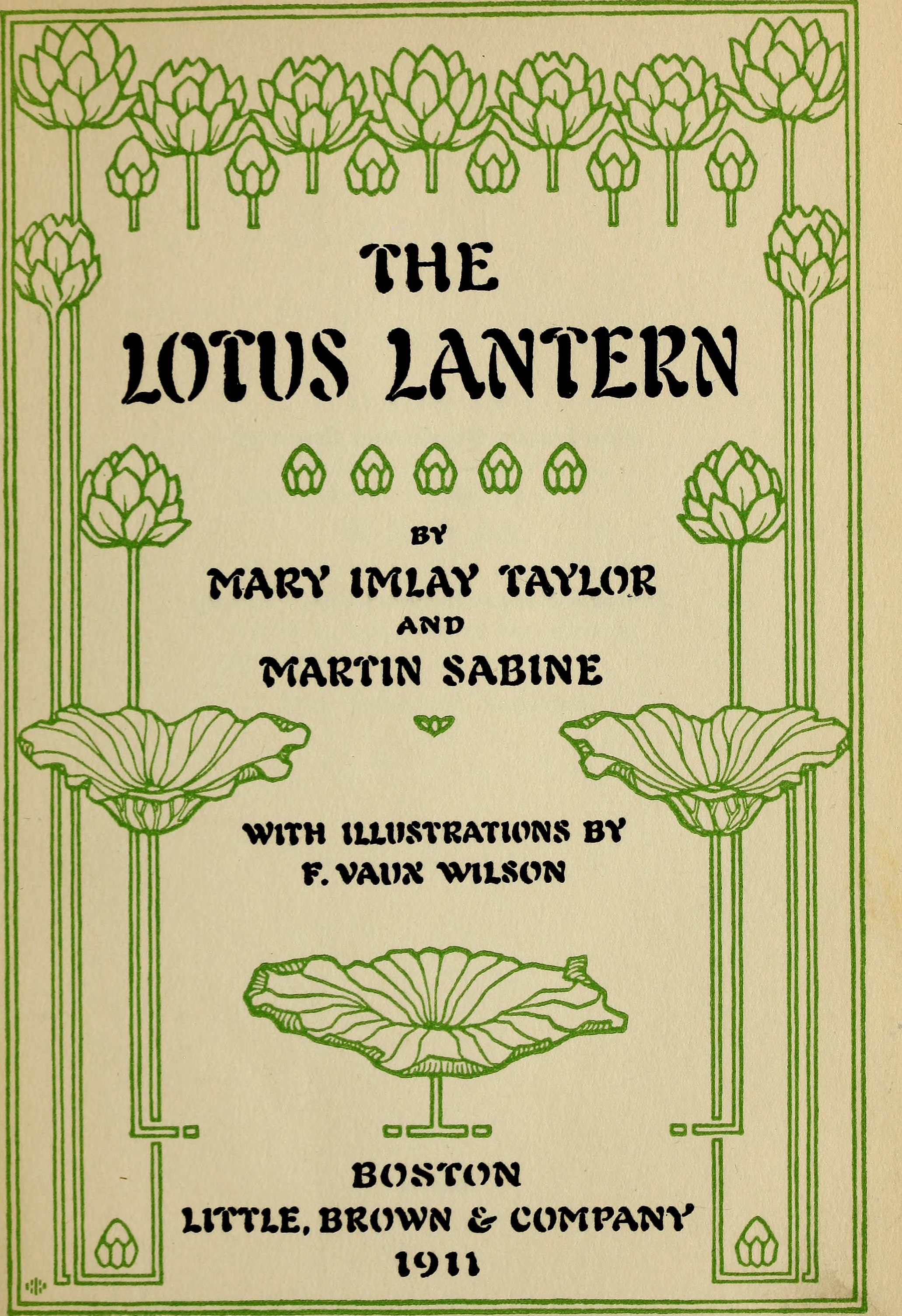
- The Lotus Lantern (1911)
  On the Red Staircase. Chicago: A. C. McClurg, 1896. London: Gay and Bird, 1898.
- An Imperial Lover. Chicago: A. C. McClurg, 1897. London: Gay and Bird, 1899.
- A Yankee Volunteer. Chicago: A. C. McClurg, 1898. London: Gay and Bird, 1899.
- The House of the Wizard. Chicago: A. C. McClurg, 1899. London: Gay and Bird, 1900.
- The Cardinal's Musketeer. Chicago: A. C. McClurg, 1900.
- The Cobbler of Nîmes. Chicago: A. C. McClurg, 1900.
- Anne Scarlet: A Romance of Colonial Times Chicago: McClurg, 1901.
- Little Mistress Goodhope and Other Fairy Tales. Chicago: A. C. McClurg, 1902.
- The Rebellion of the Princess. McClure & Phillips, 1903.
- My Lady Clancarty. Boston: Little, Brown, 1905.
- The Impersonator, Boston: Little, Brown, 1906.
- The Reaping. Boston: Little, Brown, 1908.
- Caleb Trench. Boston: Little, Brown, 1910.
- The Lotus Lantern (with Martin Sabine), 1911.
- The Long Way. Boston: Little, Brown, 1913.
- Who Pays?, 1918.
- A Candle in the Wind, 1919.
- The Wild Faun. New York: Moffat, Yard, 1920.
- The Man in the Street.
- The Love Bridge, 1925.
- Mark Turns West: A Western Story. Chelsea House, 1926.
- The Man Who Awoke, 1927.
- Mr. Battle Pays the Bills. 1927.

== Film adaptations ==
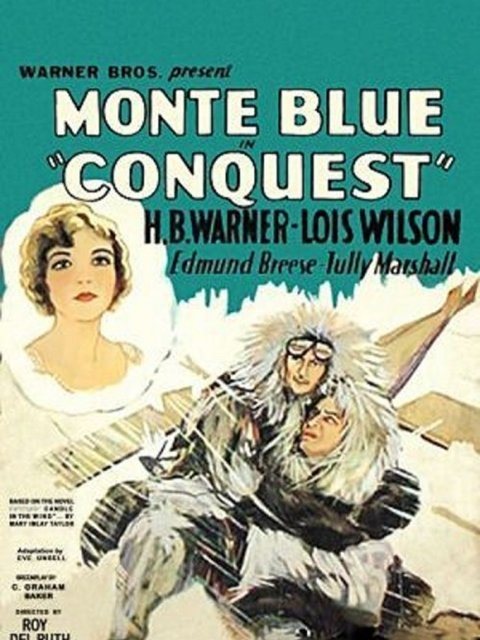
- Conquest (1928)
  The Little Bride of Heaven (Edison, 1912)
- The Tenderfoot's Money (Biograph, 1913)
- The Impersonator (Edison, 1914)
- The Man in the Street (Edison, 1914)
- The Long Way (Edison, 1914)
- A Question of Identity (Edison, 1914) - based on the short story "The Window that Monsieur Forgot"
- The Magnate of Paradise (Edison, 1915)
- In the Shadow of Death (Edison, 1915) - based on the short story "Fate and the Pomegranates"
- Friend Wilson's Daughter (Edison, 1915)
- The Ploughshare (Edison, 1915)
- An Unwilling Thief (Edison, 1915)
- Putting One Over (Fox, 1919) - based on The Man Who Awoke
- The Good-Bad Wife (Vera McCord, 1920) - based on The Wild Faun
- Conquest (Warner Brothers, 1928) - based on A Candle in the WInd
