= Ashamed of Parents =

1921 film

- Directed by: Horace G. Plympton
- Screenplay by: Adeline Hendricks
- Based on: What Children Will Do by Charles K. Harris
- Starring: Charles Eldridge; Jack Lionel Bohn; Edith Stockton; Walter McEvan; William J. Gross
- Cinematography: John W. Brown
- Production company: Warner Bros.
- Distributed by: Warner Bros.
- Release date: December 25, 1921
- Running time: 50 minutes
- Country: United States
- Language: English

Ashamed of Parents is a lost 1921 American silent drama film directed by Horace G. Plympton and written by Adeline Hendricks. The film stars Charles Eldridge, Jack Lionel Bohn, Edith Stockton, Walter McEvan and William J. Gross. The film was released by Warner Bros. on December 25, 1921.

== Cast ==
- Charles Eldridge as Silas Wadsworth
- Jack Lionel Bohn as Arthur Wadsworth
- Edith Stockton as Marian Hancock
- Walter McEvan as Albert Grimes
- William J. Gross as Peter Trotwood

== Preservation ==
With no holdings located in archives, Ashamed of Parents is considered a lost film.
