= Charles Middleton (actor) =

American actor (1874–1949)

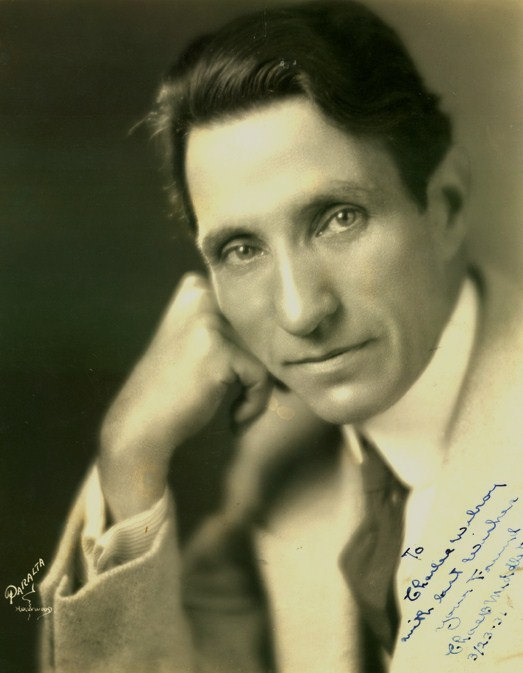
- Middleton in 1922
- Born: Charles Brown Middleton; October 3, 1874; Elizabethtown, Kentucky, U.S.
- Died: April 22, 1949 (aged 74); Los Angeles, California, U.S.
- Resting place: Hollywood Forever Cemetery
- Occupation: Actor
- Years active: 1920–1949
- Spouse: Leora Spellman (m. 1908; died 1945)
- Children: 1

Charles Brown Middleton (October 3, 1874 – April 22, 1949) was an American stage and film actor. During a film career that began at age 46 and lasted almost 30 years, he appeared in nearly 200 films as well as numerous plays. Sometimes credited as Charles B. Middleton, he is perhaps best remembered for his role as the villainous emperor Ming the Merciless in the three Flash Gordon serials made between 1936 and 1940.

== Career ==
Born in Elizabethtown, Kentucky, Middleton worked in a traveling circus and in vaudeville, and acted on stage before he turned to motion pictures in 1920. Middleton's success as a character actor, however, did not become firmly established until the sound era in films, when he became known for his resounding, stentorian speaking voice. When Harold Lloyd decided to remake his silent film Welcome Danger in the new sound-film process, he replaced the silent-film villain with Charles Middleton, whose spoken dialogue projected a more pronounced threat to Lloyd's screen character. Middleton's ominous baritone made him an excellent foil for Lloyd, Eddie Cantor, Wheeler & Woolsey, and especially Laurel and Hardy.

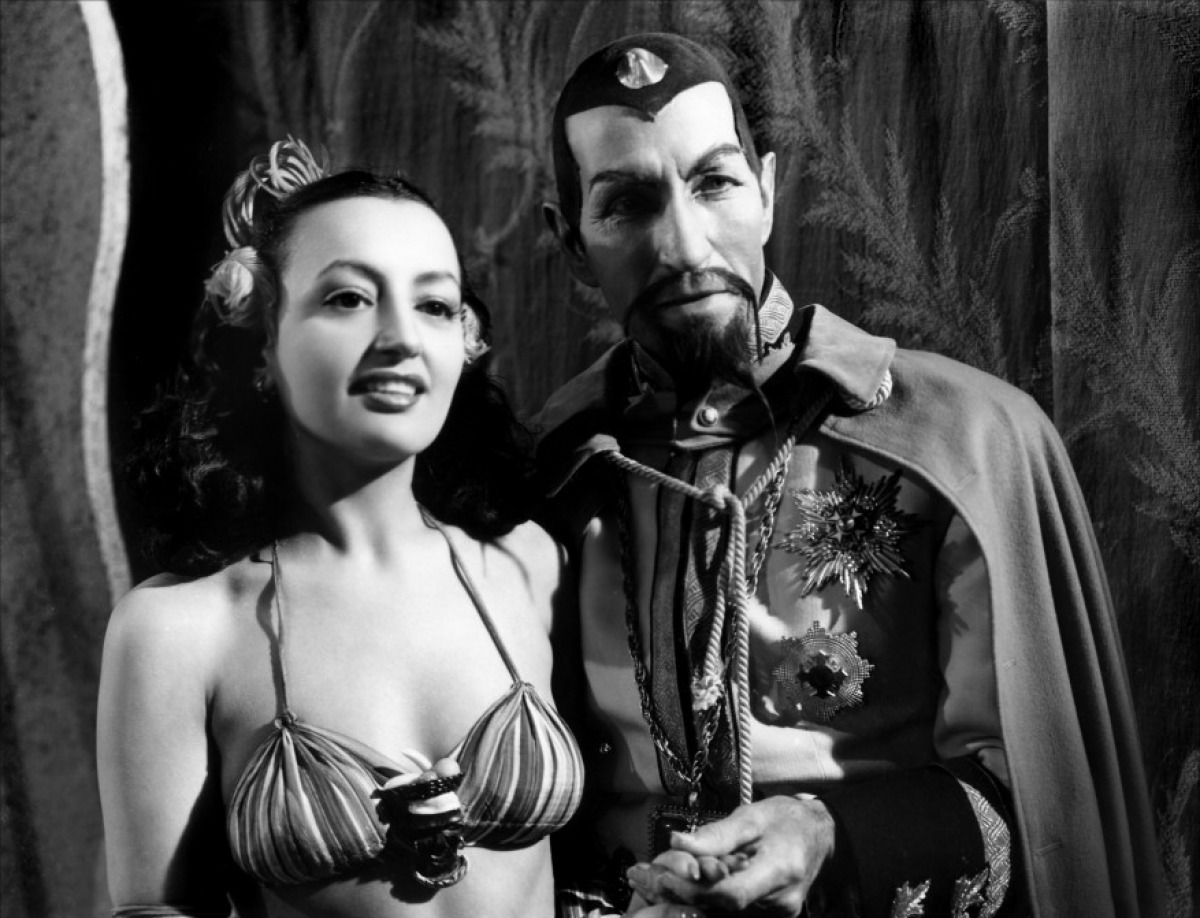
Actress Carmen D'Antonio with Middleton as Emperor Ming in the 1940 serial Flash Gordon Conquers the Universe

At Warner Bros. he was cast in Safe in Hell (1931) starring Dorothy Mackaill, and The Strange Love of Molly Louvain (1932) starring Ann Dvorak and Richard Cromwell. In Pack Up Your Troubles, he portrays a villainous welfare association officer opposite Laurel & Hardy. He is also the district attorney in Cecil B. DeMille's 1933 film This Day and Age; and he appears opposite The Marx Brothers in Duck Soup (also 1933), performing as the stern prosecutor of Freedonia. In Universal Pictures' classic 1936 screen version of the musical Show Boat, he is Sheriff Ike Vallon, the official who tries to arrest Julie La Verne (Helen Morgan) and her husband for being illegally married.

Since Middleton's facial features generally resembled those of Abraham Lincoln, he was often called upon to portray the famous statesman. In 1932 he impersonated Lincoln in George M. Cohan's The Phantom President. He repeated the characterization in the 1933 public-service short The Road Is Open Again. Four years later, in an uncredited role in the comedy Stand-In, he appears as an actor dressed as Lincoln who complains of being typecast as the former president. Middleton's association with Lincoln did not end there, although in the 1940 feature film Abe Lincoln in Illinois, he performs not as Abe but as Thomas, Lincoln's father.

Middleton's brand of old-school theatrical villainy made him an ideal menace in many serials from 1935 to 1947. He is especially well known for his characterization of Ming the Merciless, the evil adversary of the heroic outer-space adventurer Flash Gordon. He appears as Ming in three related serials: Flash Gordon (1936), Flash Gordon's Trip to Mars (1938), and Flash Gordon Conquers the Universe (1940). Some of the other serials in which Middleton can be seen include Perils of Nyoka, The Miracle Rider, Dick Tracy Returns, Daredevils of the Red Circle, Batman, and Jack Armstrong. He also portrays the ranch foreman Buck Peters in the 1935 movie Hopalong Cassidy Enters, which is the first entry in that long-running Western series.

== Death ==
Middleton's gravesite is located in Hollywood Forever Cemetery and is situated next to the grave of his wife of many years, stage and film actress Leora Spellman.

== Selected filmography ==
- The $1,000,000 Reward (1920) as William Russell
- Wits vs. Wits (1920) as Frank Cheny
- The Evil Dead (1922) as William Russell
- Pirates of the Pines (1928)
- The Farmer's Daughter (1928) as Hiram Flint
- The Bellamy Trial (1929) as District Attorney
- The Far Call (1929) as Kris Larsen
- Welcome Danger (1929) as John Thorne
- Beau Bandit (1930) as Lucius J. Perkins
- Way Out West (1930) as Buck Rankin
- East Is West (1930) as Dr. Fredericks
- Ships of Hate (1931) as Captain Lash
- The Miracle Woman (1931) as Simpson
- An American Tragedy (1931) as Jephson
- Caught Plastered (1931) as Sheriff Flint
- Alexander Hamilton (1931) as Rabble Rousing Townsman (uncredited)
- Palmy Days (1931) as Yolando
- A Dangerous Affair (1931) as Tupper
- Sob Sister (1931) as City Editor Baker
- The Ruling Voice (1931) as Board Member (uncredited)
- A House Divided (1931) as Minister
- Safe in Hell (1931) as Lawyer Jones
- X Marks the Spot (1931) as Detective Kirby
- Manhattan Parade (1931) as Sheriff Casey (uncredited)
- Full of Notions (1931)
- Beau Hunks (1931) as Camp Commandant (short subject)
- Forbidden (1932) as Pianist (uncredited)
- High Pressure (1932) as Mr. Banks
- The Hatchet Man (1932) as Lip Hop Fat
- The Strange Love of Molly Louvain (1932) as Captain Slade
- Mystery Ranch (1932) as Henry Steele
- Pack Up Your Troubles (1932) as The Welfare Association Officer
- The Phantom President (1932) as Abe Lincoln (uncredited)
- Hell's Highway (1932) as Matthew the Hermit
- Breach of Promise (1932) as Joe Pugmire
- I Am a Fugitive from a Chain Gang (1932) as Train Conductor (uncredited)
- Rockabye (1932) as District Attorney (uncredited)
- The Sign of the Cross (1932) as Tyros
- Silver Dollar (1932) as Jenkins
- Too Busy to Work (1932) as Chief of Police
- Pick-Up (1933) as Mr. Brewster
- Destination Unknown (1933) as Turk
- The Three Musketeers (1933) as El Shaitan-Speaking (uncredited)
- Sunset Pass (1933) as Williams
- The Mystic Hour (1933) as Roger Thurston
- Tomorrow at Seven (1933) as Jerry Simons
- Disgraced! (1933) as district attorney
- This Day and Age (1933) as district attorney
- The Road is Open Again (1933, Short) as Abraham Lincoln
- Doctor Bull (1933) as Mr. Upjohn, Selectman (uncredited)
- The Bowery (1933) as Detective (uncredited)
- Big Executive (1933) as Sheriff
- White Woman (1933) as Fenton
- Duck Soup (1933) as Prosecutor
- The World Changes (1933) as Sheriff Wild Bill Hickok (uncredited)
- Lone Cowboy (1933) as U.S. Marshal
- Mr. Skitch (1933) as Frank (uncredited)
- Massacre (1934) as Sheriff Scatters
- Nana (1934) as Man Announcing Start of the War (uncredited)
- David Harum (1934) as Deacon Perkins
- The Last Round-Up (1934) as Sheriff
- Private Scandal (1934) as Mr. Baker (uncredited)
- Murder at the Vanities (1934) as Homer Boothby
- Whom the Gods Destroy (1934) as Constable Malcolm (uncredited)
- When Strangers Meet (1934) as John Tarman
- Mrs. Wiggs of the Cabbage Patch (1934) as Mr. Bagby
- The St. Louis Kid (1934) as Sheriff (uncredited)
- Broadway Bill (1934) as Veterinarian (uncredited)
- Behold My Wife! (1934) as Juan Storm Cloud
- Red Morning (1934) as Stanchon
- The County Chairman (1935) as Riley Cleaver
- Square Shooter (1935) as Jed Miller
- In Spite of Danger (1935) as Mr. Merritt
- The Miracle Rider (1935) as Zaroff
- Reckless (1935) as District Attorney (uncredited)
- Hop-Along Cassidy (1935) as Buck Peters
- Steamboat Round the Bend (1935) as Fleety Belle's Father (uncredited)
- Special Agent (1935) as State Police Commander (uncredited)
- The Virginia Judge (1935)
- Frisco Kid (1935) as Speaker (uncredited)
- Rose of the Rancho (1936) as Horse Doctor (uncredited)
- Sunset of Power (1936) as Neil Brannum
- The Trail of the Lonesome Pine (1936) as Blacksmith
- Road Gang (1936) as Mine Warden Grayson
- Song of the Saddle (1936) as Phineas Hook
- Flash Gordon (1936, Serial) as Ming the Merciless
- Show Boat (1936) as Sheriff Ike Vallon
- A Son Comes Home (1936) as Prosecutor
- Jailbreak (1936) as Dan Stone
- The Texas Rangers (1936) as Higgins' Lawyer (uncredited)
- Ramona (1936) as American Settler (uncredited)
- Wedding Present (1936) as Turnbull (uncredited)
- Career Woman (1936) as Matt Clay
- Empty Saddles (1936) as Cimarron (Cim) White
- The Good Earth (1937) as Banker (uncredited)
- We're on the Jury (1937) as Mr. B.J. Martin, Jury Foreman
- John Meade's Woman (1937) as Farmer (uncredited)
- Two Gun Law (1937) as Wolf Larson
- Hollywood Cowboy (1937) as Doc Kramer
- Yodelin' Kid from Pine Ridge (1937) as Gene Autry Sr.
- Slave Ship (1937) as Slave Dealer
- The Last Train from Madrid (1937) as Warden (uncredited)
- Souls at Sea (1937) as Jury Foreman (uncredited)
- Conquest (1937) as Sergeant at Elba (uncredited)
- Stand-In (1937) as Actor Dressed as Abraham Lincoln (uncredited)
- Jezebel (1938) as Officer (uncredited)
- Flash Gordon's Trip to Mars (1938, Serial) as Emperor Ming
- Flaming Frontiers (1938, Serial) as Ace Daggett (Chs. 5–15)
- Dick Tracy Returns (1938) as Pa Stark
- Strange Faces (1938) as Abraham Lincoln look-alike (uncredited)
- The Law West of Tombstone (1938) as Newspaper Editor (uncredited)
- The Strange Case of Dr. Meade (1938) as Lacey
- Kentucky (1938) as Southerner
- Jesse James (1939) as Doctor
- The Oklahoma Kid (1939) as Alec Martin
- Juarez (1939) as Carbajal (scenes deleted)
- Captain Fury (1939) as Mergon
- Daredevils of the Red Circle (1939) as 39013, Harry Crowel
- Wyoming Outlaw (1939) as Luke Parker
- Way Down South (1939) as Cass
- Blackmail (1939) as Southern Deputy (uncredited)
- $1,000 a Touchdown (1939) as Stage Manager (uncredited)
- The Flying Deuces (1939) as Commandant
- Allegheny Uprising (1939) as Dr. Stoke (uncredited)
- Cowboys from Texas (1939) as Kansas Jones
- Gone with the Wind (1939) as Man With Stove Pipe Hat in Charge of Convict Workers (uncredited)
- Thou Shalt Not Kill (1939) as Lars Olsen
- Abe Lincoln in Illinois (1940) as Tom Lincoln
- The Grapes of Wrath (1940) as Roadblock Leader
- Virginia City (1940) as Jefferson Davis
- Flash Gordon Conquers the Universe (1940, Serial) as Emperor Ming
- Shooting High (1940) as Hod Carson
- Charlie Chan's Murder Cruise (1940) as Mr. Walters
- Island of Doomed Men (1940) as Captain Cort
- Gold Rush Maisie (1940) as Camp Owner with a Pig (uncredited)
- Brigham Young (1940) as Mob Member (uncredited)
- Rangers of Fortune (1940) as Water Thug (uncredited)
- Santa Fe Trail (1940) as Gentry
- Chad Hanna (1940) as Sheriff (scenes deleted)
- Western Union (1941) as Stagecoach Rider (uncredited)
- Ride, Kelly, Ride (1941) as Mr. Dunn, Foreman (uncredited)
- Sergeant York (1941) as Mountaineer (uncredited)
- The Shepherd of the Hills (1941) as Blacksmith (uncredited)
- Wild Geese Calling (1941) as Doctor Jed Sloan
- Belle Starr (1941) as Carpetbagger
- Stick to Your Guns (1941) as Long Ben
- Jungle Man (1941) as Rev. James 'Jim' Graham
- Wild Bill Hickok Rides (1942) as Claim Jumping Leader (uncredited)
- Sing Your Worries Away (1942) as Judge (uncredited)
- The Mystery of Marie Roget (1942) as Curator
- Men of San Quentin (1942) as Saunderson
- Tombstone, the Town Too Tough to Die (1942) as 1st Mayor
- Perils of Nyoka (1942) as Cassib
- Two Weeks to Live (1943) as Elmer Kelton (uncredited)
- Hangmen Also Die! (1943) as Patriot at Meeting with Svoboda (uncredited)
- The Black Raven (1943) as Sheriff
- Spook Louder (1943) as Graves' butler (uncredited)
- Batman (1943) as Ken Colton [Ch. 6-8] (uncredited)
- Crazy House (1943) as Sheriff (uncredited)
- The Desert Hawk (1944) as Koda Bey
- Kismet (1944) as The Miser (uncredited)
- Black Arrow (1944) as Tom Whitney
- The Town Went Wild (1944) as Sam, Midvale District Attorney
- Hollywood and Vine (1945) as Wilson, Abigail's Lawyer (uncredited)
- Our Vines Have Tender Grapes (1945) as Kurt Jensen
- Northwest Trail (1945) as Pierre
- Who's Guilty? (1945) as Patton Calvert
- How Doooo You Do!!! (1945) as Sheriff Hayworth
- Strangler of the Swamp (1946) as Ferryman Douglas
- Spook Busters (1946) as Mr. Stiles
- The Killers (1946) as Farmer (uncredited)
- Desert Command (1946) as El Shaitan (voice, uncredited)
- Jack Armstrong (1947) as Jason Grood (uncredited)
- The Sea of Grass (1947) as Charley, Saloon Owner (uncredited)
- Welcome Stranger (1947) as Farmer Pinkett (uncredited)
- Gunfighters (1947) as Sheriff #1 (uncredited)
- Wyoming (1947) as Rev. Withers (uncredited)
- The Pretender (1947) as William the Butler
- Unconquered (1947) as Mulligan (scenes deleted)
- Road to Rio (1947) as Farmer (uncredited)
- My Girl Tisa (1948) as Examiner (uncredited)
- Here Comes Trouble (1948) as Reporter (uncredited)
- Mr. Blandings Builds His Dream House (1948) as Wrecker (uncredited)
- Feudin', Fussin' and A-Fightin' (1948) as Townsman (uncredited)
- Station West (1948) as Sheriff
- Jiggs and Maggie in Court (1948) as Mr. Burton, an Attorney
- The Decision of Christopher Blake (1948) as President in Dream (uncredited)
- The Last Bandit (1949) as Blindfolded Circuit Rider (final film role)
