= Who's Your Brother? =

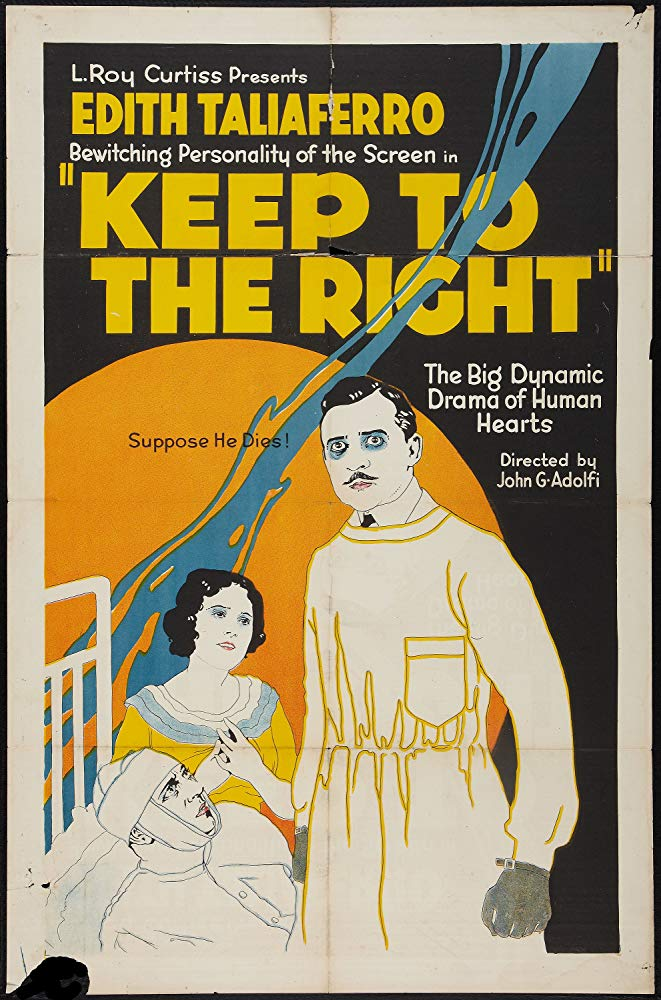
- Poster with the film's alternative title
- Directed by: John G. Adolfi
- Written by: Robert Bronson Stockbridge
- Starring: Edith Taliaferro; Frank Burbeck; Paul Panzer
- Cinematography: Harry Leslie Keepers
- Production company: Curtiss Pictures Corporation
- Distributed by: Equity Pictures Corporation
- Release date: December 1919
- Country: United States
- Languages: Silent; English intertitles

Who's Your Brother? is a 1919 American silent drama film directed by John G. Adolfi and starring Edith Taliaferro, Frank Burbeck and Paul Panzer. It was also released under the alternative title Keep to the Right.

== Cast ==
- Edith Taliaferro as Esther Field
- Frank Burbeck as Stephen Field
- Paul Panzer as Stephen Field (20 years earlier)
- Coit Albertson as Dr. William Morris
- Herbert Fortier as Robert E. Graham Sr.
- Gladden James as Robert E. Graham Jr.
- Elizabeth Garrison as Mrs. Robert Graham
- Edith Stockton as Dorothy Graham

== Bibliography ==
- Darby, William. Masters of Lens and Light: A Checklist of Major Cinematographers and Their Feature Films. Scarecrow Press, 1991.
