= The Conquest of Canaan (1916 film) =

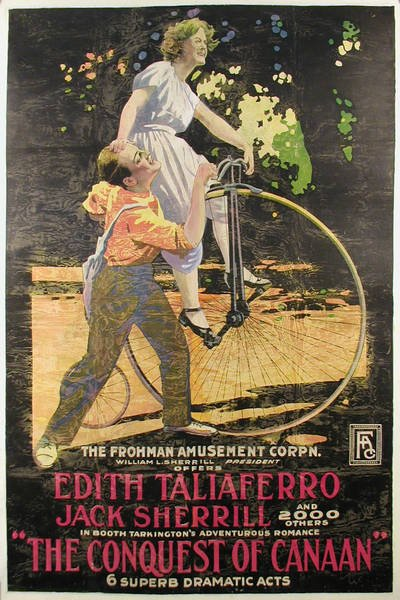
- Directed by: George Irving
- Written by: Anthony Paul Kelly
- Based on: The Conquest of Canaan by Booth Tarkington
- Starring: Edith Taliaferro; Jack Sherrill; Ralph Delmore
- Cinematography: William A. Reinhart
- Production company: Frohman Amusement Company
- Release date: October 1916
- Running time: 50 minutes
- Country: United States
- Languages: Silent; English intertitles

The Conquest of Canaan is a 1916 American silent drama film directed by George Irving and starring Edith Taliaferro, Jack Sherrill and Ralph Delmore. It was based on the novel by Booth Tarkington which was subsequently remade as a 1921 film of the same title.

== Cast ==
- Edith Taliaferro as Ariel Tabor
- Jack Sherrill as Joe Louden
- Ralph Delmore as Judge Pike
- Marie Wells as Mamie Pike
- Jean La Motte as Claudine
- Jack Hopkins as Happy Fear
- Walter Hiers as Norman Flitcroft
- Thomas Ward as Nashville Corey
- Ben Hendricks Sr. as Mike
- Philip Robson as Martin Mann
- David Higgins as Frank R. Buck

== Bibliography ==
- Robert B. Connelly. The Silents: Silent Feature Films, 1910-36, Volume 40, Issue 2. December Press, 1998.
