= Face to Face (1922 film) =

1922 film

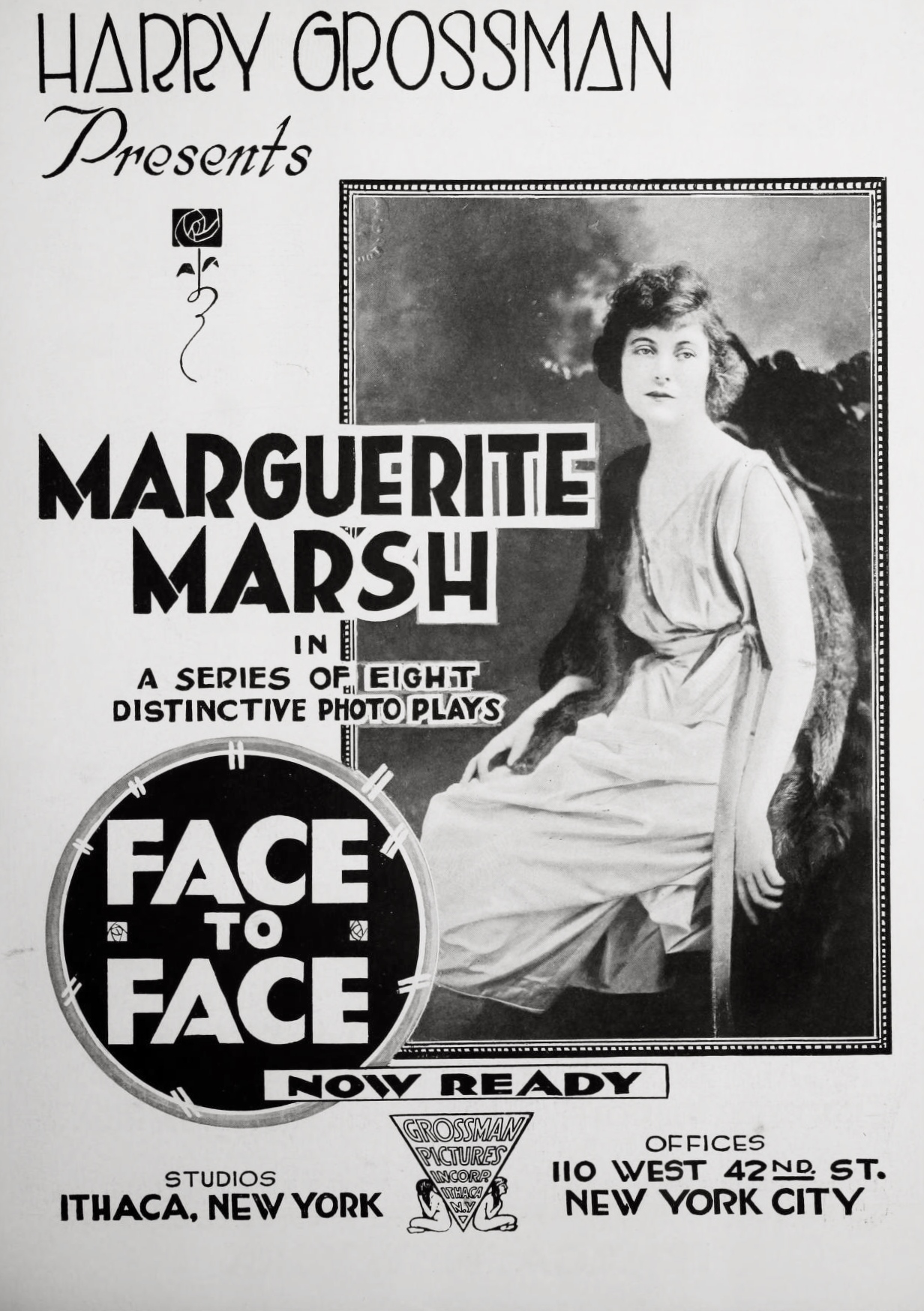
- Directed by: Harry Grossman
- Written by: Harry Grossman
- Starring: Marguerite Marsh; Edna Holman; Coit Albertson
- Production company: Reginald Warde Productions
- Distributed by: Playgoers Pictures
- Release date: September 17, 1922
- Running time: 50 minutes
- Country: United States
- Languages: Silent; English intertitles

Face to Face is a 1922 American silent mystery film directed by Harry Grossman and starring Marguerite Marsh, Edna Holman and Coit Albertson. It was distributed by the independent company Playgoers Pictures.

== Plot ==
At the same time as John Weston commits suicide, burglar Bert Manners is panicked and shoots his own reflection in the mirror. Arrested for murder, a schoolgirl friend of the dead man turns detective to prove him innocent of the killing.

== Cast ==
- Marguerite Marsh as Helen Marsley
- Edna Holman as Grace Weston
- F.W. Stewart as John W. Weston
- Coit Albertson as Jack Weston
- Joe Smith Marba as Martin Hartley
- Frances White as Cleo Rand
- William Kendall as Bert Manners

== Preservation ==
In February 2021, Face to Face was cited by the National Film Preservation Board on their Lost U.S. Silent Feature Films list and therefore presumed lost.

== Bibliography ==
- Connelly, Robert B. The Silents: Silent Feature Films, 1910-36, Volume 40, Issue 2. December Press, 1998.
- Munden, Kenneth White. The American Film Institute Catalog of Motion Pictures Produced in the United States, Part 1. University of California Press, 1997.
- Wlaschin, Ken. Silent Mystery and Detective Movies: A Comprehensive Filmography. McFarland, 2009.
