= Harry Grossman =

American film director (1881–1927)

Harry Grossman (March 11, 1881–1927) was a film director and producer.

His Grossman Pictures filmed the film serial The $1,000,000 Reward in Ithaca, New York at the former Wharton studio before moving to New York City. George A. Lessey directed the adaptation of Arthur B. Reeve's story.

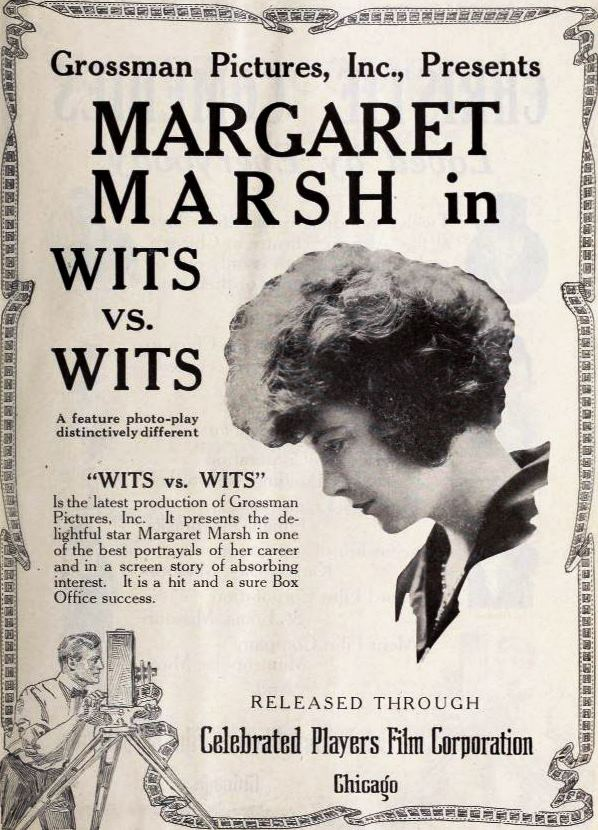
Advertisement for the film Wits vs. Wits ad

== Filmography ==
- The Master Mystery (1918), director with Burton L. King, a film starring Harry Houdini
- The $1,000,000 Reward (1920), producer, a serial
- Wits vs. Wits (1920)
- Face to Face (1922), director
