= Putting One Over =

1919 American silent film

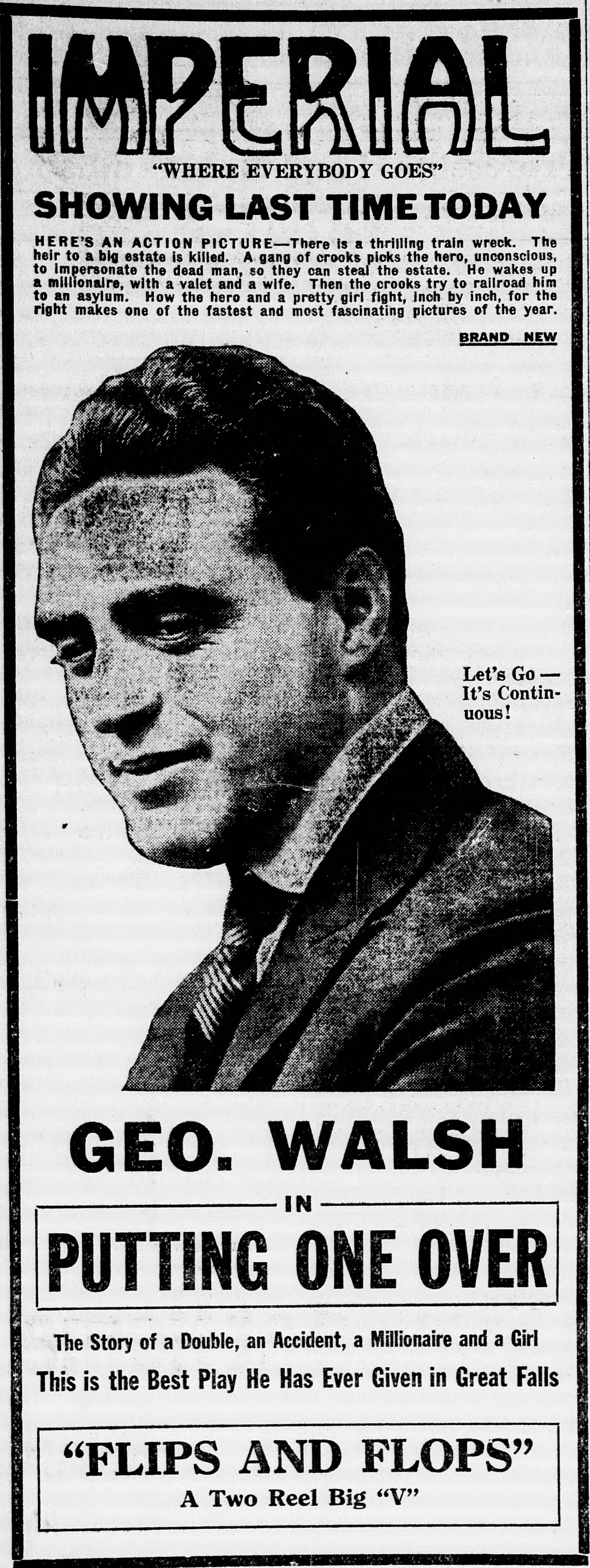
- Newspaper advertisement
- Directed by: Edward Dillon
- Produced by: William Fox
- Starring: George Walsh
- Cinematography: H. Alderson Leach
- Distributed by: Fox Film
- Release date: June 19, 1919
- Running time: 5 reels
- Country: USA
- Languages: Silent, English intertitles

Putting One Over is a lost 1919 silent film drama directed by Edward Dillon and starring George Walsh. It was produced and directed by Fox Film Corporation. It was based on the story "The Man Who Awoke" by Mary Imlay Taylor.

== Cast ==
- George Walsh - Horace Barney/Jack Trevor
- Edith Stockton - Helen Townsend
- Ralph J. Locke - Maurice Claypool
- Frank Beamish - Thomas Farrel
- Robert Lee Kealing - Dr. John Wallace
- Matthew Betz - Giles
- John T. Dillon - Dobbs
- Elizabeth Garrison - Mrs. Townsend
- Marcia Harris - Mrs. Eleanor Davies
- Henry Hallam - Johnny Thomkins
