= The Mad Dancer =

1925 silent film

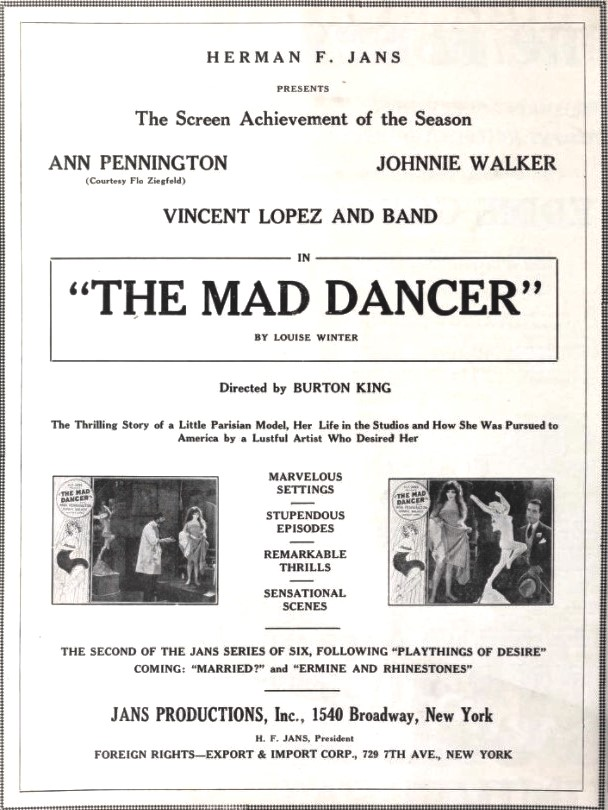
- Advertisement
- Directed by: Burton L. King
- Written by: William B. Laub
- Based on: "The Mad Dancer" by Louise Winter
- Produced by: Burton L. King
- Starring: Ann Pennington; Johnnie Walker; Coit Albertson
- Cinematography: Charles J. Davis
- Edited by: William B. Laub
- Production company: Burton King Productions
- Distributed by: Jans Film Service
- Release date: February 15, 1925
- Running time: 70 minutes
- Country: United States
- Language: Silent (English intertitles)

The Mad Dancer is a 1925 American silent drama film directed by Burton L. King and starring Ann Pennington, Johnnie Walker, and Coit Albertson.

== Synopsis ==
Mimi, a dancer who lives in the Latin Quarter of Paris, poses nude for a sculpture. When her father commits suicide she moves to the United States but finds that her relatives there disapprove of her. She becomes engaged to the son of an American senator, but her past threatens to catch up with her.

== Cast ==
- Ann Pennington as Mimi
- Johnnie Walker as Keith Arundel
- Coit Albertson as Serge Verlaine
- John Woodford as Robert Halleck
- Frank Montgomery as Jean Gaboule
- Ricca Allen as Ada Halleck
- William F. Haddock as Elmer Halleck
- John Costello as John Arundel
- Nellie Savage as Princess Gibesco
- Echlin Gayer as Prince Carl
- Clarence Sunshine as Cupid Karsleed

== Production ==
The Mad Dancer was filmed at the Tec-Art Studio in New York City. Pennington, who had performed in the Ziegfeld Follies and George White's Scandals, appeared nude for the modeling scene for the sculpture. At the time, brief stationary nudity, similar to a tableau vivant, appeared in a few American films with scenes involving women posing for painters or sculptors. As an experiment, one scene involving Pennington and Vincent Lopez and his band was broadcast over the radio on Newark, New Jersey station WJZ (today WABC of New York City) while being filming.

== Preservation ==
Prints of The Mad Dancer are held in the UCLA Film & Television Archive and George Eastman Museum Motion Picture Collection.

== Bibliography ==
- Koszarski, Richard (2008). Hollywood on the Hudson: Film and Television in New York from Griffith to Sarnoff. Rutgers University Press. ISBN 978-0-8135-4293-5
- Munden, Kenneth White (1997). The American Film Institute Catalog of Motion Pictures Produced in the United States, Part 1. University of California Press. ISBN 0-520-20969-9
