= Out of the Chorus =

1921 film

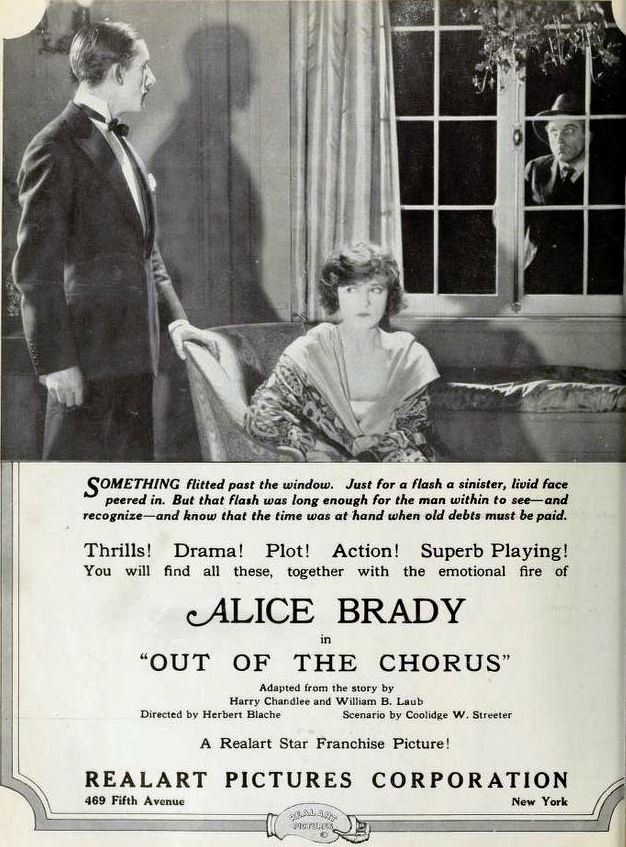
- Advertisement
- Directed by: Herbert Blache; Joseph H. Nadel (ass't director)
- Written by: Harry Chandlee (story); William B. Laub (story); Coolidge Streeter (scenario)
- Starring: Alice Brady; Vernon Steele
- Cinematography: Jacob A. Badaracco
- Production company: Realart Pictures Corporation
- Distributed by: Realart Pictures Corporation
- Release date: February 1921
- Running time: 50 minutes (5 reels)
- Country: United States
- Language: Silent (English intertitles)

Out of the Chorus is a lost 1921 American silent drama film starring Alice Brady and directed by Herbert Blache. It was produced and distributed by Paramount offshoot Realart Pictures.

== Plot ==
As described in a summary in a film publication, chorus girl Florence Maddis marries Ross Van Beekman, a son in an aristocratic family. His mother Mrs. Van Beekman is determined to turn Ross against his wife, and plots with Ned Ormsby, who wants Florence for himself. Mrs. Van Beekman contrives to have Ned and Florence thrown together often until Ross begins to doubt his wife. Ross sets a trap for her, and on his return finds evidence that Ned was also there, but the wife is an innocent victim of the scheme. Ross shoots through a door behind which he believes Ned is hiding and when Ned is later mysteriously murdered in his home, Ross believes that he is the killer. Florence, to save her husband's life, lies when testifying at trial and says that Ned was shot while he was with her. The truth and Ross' innocence are finally established, and Florence's actions win the love and esteem of Ross and his family.

== Cast ==
- Alice Brady as Florence Maddis
- Vernon Steele as Ross Van Beekman
- Charles K. Gerrard as Ned Ormsby
- Emily Fitzroy as Mrs. Van Beekman
- Edith Stockton as Fola
- Richard Carlyle as Maddox
- Constance Berry as Margaret Van Beekman
- Ben Probst as Feinstein
