= Conquest (1928 film) =

1928 film

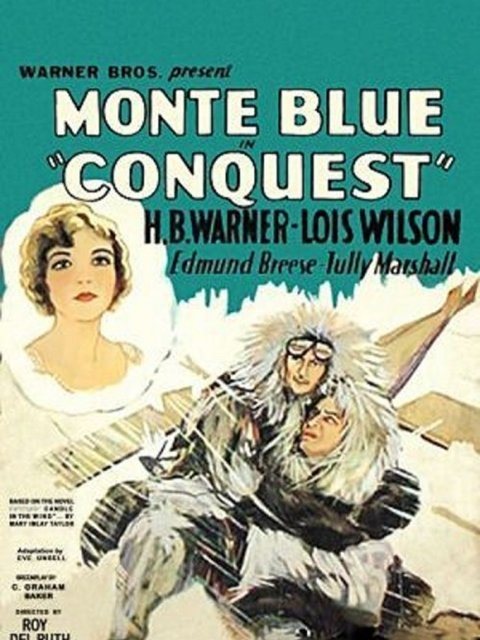
- Film poster
- Directed by: Roy Del Ruth
- Written by: C. Graham Baker; Joseph Jackson (titles); Jackson Rose (dialogue); Eve Unsell (adaptation)
- Based on: A Candle in the Wind; 1919 novel by Mary Imlay Taylor
- Produced by: Warner Brothers
- Starring: Monte Blue; H.B. Warner; Lois Wilson
- Cinematography: Barney McGill
- Edited by: Jack Killifer
- Production company: The Vitaphone Corporation
- Distributed by: Warner Bros. Pictures
- Release date: December 22, 1928
- Running time: 75 minutes
- Country: United States
- Language: English

Conquest (aka The Candle in the Wind) is a 1928 American aviation drama film, based on the short story "The Candle in the Wind" by Mary Imlay Taylor. (Note: Prior to publication in book form, Mary Imlay Taylor's novel was serialized in Munsey's Magazine (July–November 1917).) The film was made using the Vitaphone sound process. Conquest was directed by Roy Del Ruth, and stars Monte Blue, H.B. Warner and Lois Wilson. The film is a melodrama about an aircraft crash in Antarctica. Conquest is now considered a lost film, although the complete soundtrack exists on Vitaphone discs.

== Plot ==
At the Holden residence, renowned explorer William Holden, his daughter Diane, and their friend Dr. Gerry, a respected psychiatrist, anxiously listen to a radio broadcast tracking a daring flight to the South Pole. The aviators aboard are Donald Overton, the man Diane loves, and James Farnham, Donald's longtime friend and co-pilot.

As the aircraft battles fierce headwinds and deteriorating weather, tension rises among the listeners. Suddenly, the broadcast announces that the plane has entered a tailspin—then the radio goes silent.

Ten days later, a rescue expedition finds Farnham alive, but barely—he's half-blind and frostbitten. He reports that Overton died in the crash and discourages any further search for the body.

Back in civilization, Farnham is hailed as a national hero. At a celebration hosted at the Holden home, he's urged to recount the ordeal. As he nervously relays the events surrounding Overton's supposed death, Dr. Gerry grows suspicious of the inconsistencies in his story. Nevertheless, Holden proudly announces a second South Pole expedition, with Farnham again at the helm. The news visibly disturbs the aviator.

Meanwhile, Farnham begins courting Diane, who is still in mourning for Donald. Torn by grief and moved by Farnham's apparent devotion, Diane reluctantly agrees to marry him. The night before the wedding, Farnham privately visits Dr. Gerry and confesses the truth: Donald Overton had survived the crash with a broken leg, but Farnham abandoned him to die on the polar ice. Dr. Gerry demands he tell Diane the truth if he intends to marry her. When Farnham refuses, Gerry threatens to expose him himself.

Later that evening, Farnham is contemplating suicide when he receives a phone call: Dr. Gerry has just been killed in a car accident. Believing the truth will die with the doctor, Farnham regains his composure and proceeds with the wedding.

Now married to Diane, Farnham is shaken to hear a report that Overton may still be alive. A follow-up broadcast clarifies that the man was merely a deranged seal-hunter mistaken for the missing aviator. But on a distant whaling vessel, the real Donald Overton—frostbitten, scarred, and emotionally scarred as well—is very much alive. Believed to be mad by his rescuers, he vows revenge on the man who betrayed him.

Weeks later, after Diane and Farnham return from their honeymoon, a persistent stranger appears at the Holden home asking for Diane. When Farnham answers the door, he is stunned to see Overton. Donald threatens to reveal everything, but Diane enters before he can speak. She and Overton embrace, overjoyed to see each other, but before Diane can explain her marriage, Overton—realizing the truth—suppresses his feelings and congratulates the couple. Alone with Farnham, though, he makes his hatred known.

Soon after, William Holden consults with the two aviators about the renewed expedition. Farnham, in a calculated move, suggests that Overton should pilot the flight as a returning hero. Over the following days, both Donald and Diane wrestle with their emotions. One night, Farnham overhears Diane confess to her father that it is Donald—not her husband—whom she truly loves.

Driven by jealousy and fear, Farnham devises a deadly plan. He insists on accompanying Overton on the polar mission. Once they reach the South Pole and turn back, Farnham attempts to shove Donald out of the aircraft. In the struggle, the plane crashes once more in the desolate ice fields.

This time, Overton survives and discovers Farnham lying in the snow with a broken leg—just as he had once been left behind. Overton contemplates abandoning his rival to the same fate, but ultimately cannot bring himself to do it. He hoists the injured Farnham onto his back and carries him across the ice until they are rescued.

Back aboard the base ship, Farnham tearfully begs Donald's forgiveness. At first Overton refuses, but finally, sensing the sincerity of his plea, he offers his hand in reconciliation. Moments later, a cry of “Man overboard!” echoes across the ship—Farnham has thrown himself into the sea.

As the vessel turns homeward, Donald Overton gazes into the future, leaving behind the memory of betrayal and suicide, and holding hope for a renewed life with Diane.

== Cast ==
- Monte Blue as Donald Overton
- H.B. Warner as James Farnham
- Lois Wilson as Diane Holden
- Edmund Breese as William Holden
- Tully Marshall as Dr. Gerry

== Production ==
Original pre-production work was on a film project entitled The Candle in the Wind, that was subsequently changed to Conquest. Highly influenced by public awareness of Antarctic aerial exploration by Rear Admiral Richard E. Byrd, Conquest was one of a number of aviation films about Antarctica flights, that were released, including With Byrd at the South Pole (1930) and The Lost Zeppelin (1929). Principal photography on Conquest began on July 30, 1928. To recreate the aircraft used on the Antarctic flight, an "elaborate full-scale Fokker tri-motor mockup" was constructed.

== Reception ==
Aviation film historian Stephen Pendo, in Aviation in the Cinema (1985) characterized Conquest as a typical early "talkie" with a heavy reliance on dialogue, with as much as 70 percent of the film taken up by conversations.

== Preservation status ==
Conquest is considered a lost film.

== See also ==
- List of early sound feature films (1926–1929)
