= The Tenderfoot's Money =

1913 film

- Directed by: Anthony O'Sullivan
- Written by: Mary Imlay Taylor(story); Stanner E. V. Taylor
- Starring: Harry Carey
- Release date: May 5, 1913
- Country: United States
- Languages: Silent; English intertitles

The Tenderfoot's Money is a 1913 American silent Western film featuring Harry Carey.

== Cast ==
- Harry Carey as The Gambler
- William A. Carroll as The Tenderfoot
- Henry B. Walthall as The Prospector
- Claire McDowell as The Prospector's Wife
- William Beaudine as In Bar
- William J. Butler as In Bar
- John T. Dillon
- Alfred Paget

== See also ==
- Harry Carey filmography
