= The Conquest of Canaan =

1921 film

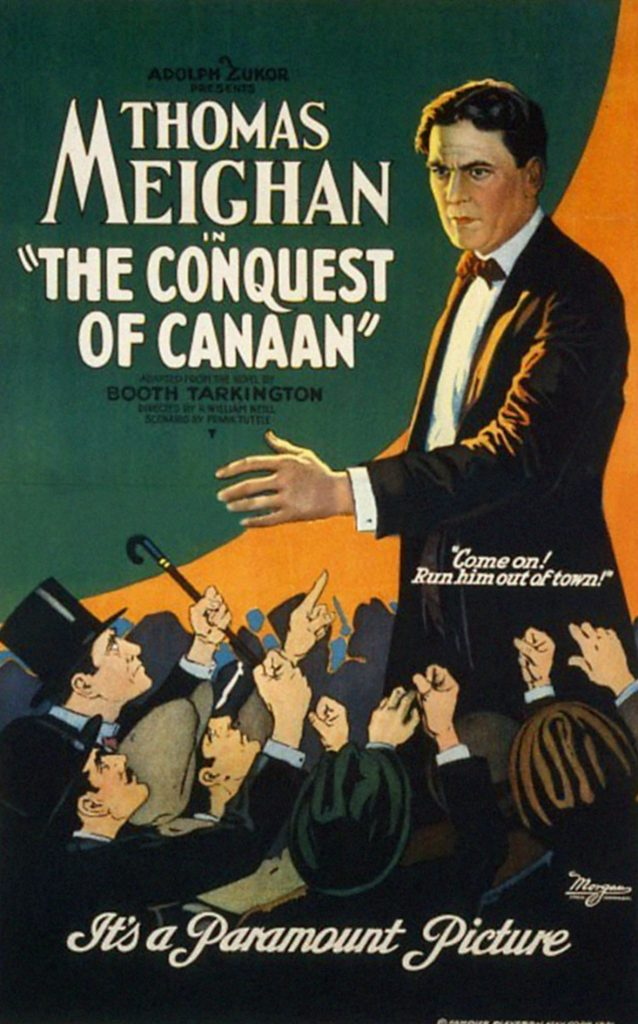
- Theatrical release poster
- Directed by: Roy William Neill
- Written by: Frank Tuttle (scenario)
- Based on: The Conquest of Canaan by Booth Tarkington
- Produced by: Adolph Zukor; Jesse L. Lasky
- Starring: Thomas Meighan; Doris Kenyon
- Cinematography: Harry Perry
- Distributed by: Paramount Pictures
- Release date: August 21, 1921
- Running time: 7 reels
- Country: United States
- Language: Silent (English intertitles)

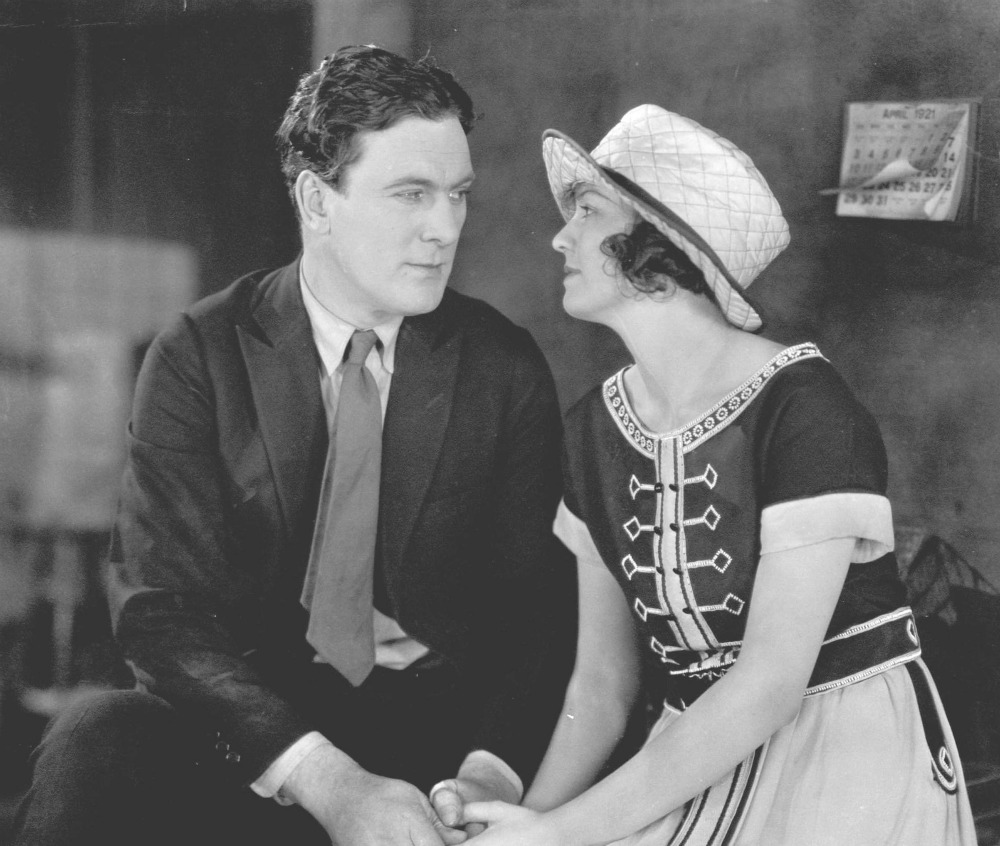
Still with Thomas Meighan and Doris Kenyon.

The Conquest of Canaan is a 1921 American silent drama film produced by Famous Players–Lasky and distributed by Paramount Pictures. It starred Thomas Meighan and Doris Kenyon and was directed by Roy William Neill. It was filmed in Asheville, North Carolina. A previous version of the story was filmed in 1916 under the same title.

== Cast ==
- Thomas Meighan as Joe Louden
- Doris Kenyon as Ariel Taber
- Diana Allen as Mamie Pike
- Ann Egleston as Mrs. Louden
- Alice Fleming as Claudine
- Charles Abbe as Eskew Arp
- Malcolm Bradley as Jonas Taber
- Paul Everton as Happy Farley
- Macey Harlam as Nashville Cory
- Henry Hallam as Colonel Flintcroft
- Louis Hendricks as Judge Pike
- Charles Hartley as Peter Bradbury
- Jed Prouty as Norbert Flintcroft
- Cyril Ring as Gene Louden
- J. D. Walsh as Squire Buckelew
- Riley Hatch as Mike Sheenan

== Preservation status ==
This film was considered lost for over seventy years until 2010, when a digital copy was returned to the United States as a gift from Russia and its film archive Gosfilmofond.
