= Edith Stockton =

American actress

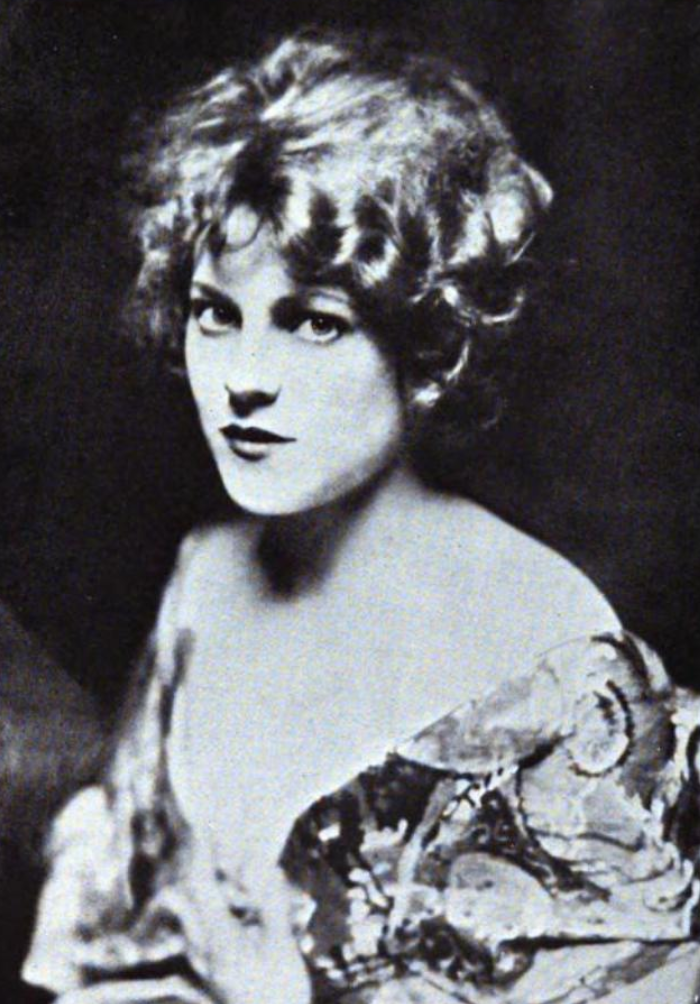
- Edith Stockton, from a 1920 publication
- Born: Edith Lillian Stockham; February 5, 1896; Rock Island, Illinois
- Died: April 21, 1968 (age 72); Coral Gables, Florida
- Other names: Edith S. Monroe
- Occupation: Actress

Edith Stockton (February 5, 1896 – April 21, 1968), born Edith Lillian Stockham, was an American actress in silent films.

== Early life and education ==
Edith Lillian Stockham was born in Rock Island, Illinois, the daughter of William Stockham and Johanna "Jennie" Benz Stockham (later Willetts). Her maternal grandparents were both born in Germany, and her father was born in England. She attended the Barrett Institute in Chicago.

== Career ==
Stockton was a chorus girl on stage in Chicago as a young woman. Her silent film credits included roles in Putting One Over (1919), The House Without Children (1919), The Open Door (1919), Who's Your Brother (1919), The Fear Market (1920), Out of the Chorus (1921), Matrimonial Web (1921), Ashamed of Parents (1921, also known as What Children Will Do), The Voice of the Blood, Keep to the Right, Should a Wife Work? (1922), and Through the Storm (1922). She also endorsed Eagle Brand Condensed Milk in print advertisements, promoted a manicure fad, and worked with the American Red Cross.

== Personal life ==
Stockton married twice. Her first husband was William E. Rexses; they married in 1916, and later divorced. She was left a fortune in the contested will of a divorced lawyer, Cornelius Pinkney of New York City, in a probate case that made headlines in the 1920s.

Her second husband was manufacturer Monroe Kaplan, known after 1940 as John Porter Monroe. They lived in Boston and Washington, D.C., and had a daughter, Barbara, born in 1933. In 1946, John Porter Monroe was found guilty on 29 federal charges related to overcharging during World War II. Edith Stockham Monroe died in 1968, in Coral Gables, Florida, at the age of 72.
