= Leora Spellman =

American actress and vaudeville performer (1888/1890–1945)

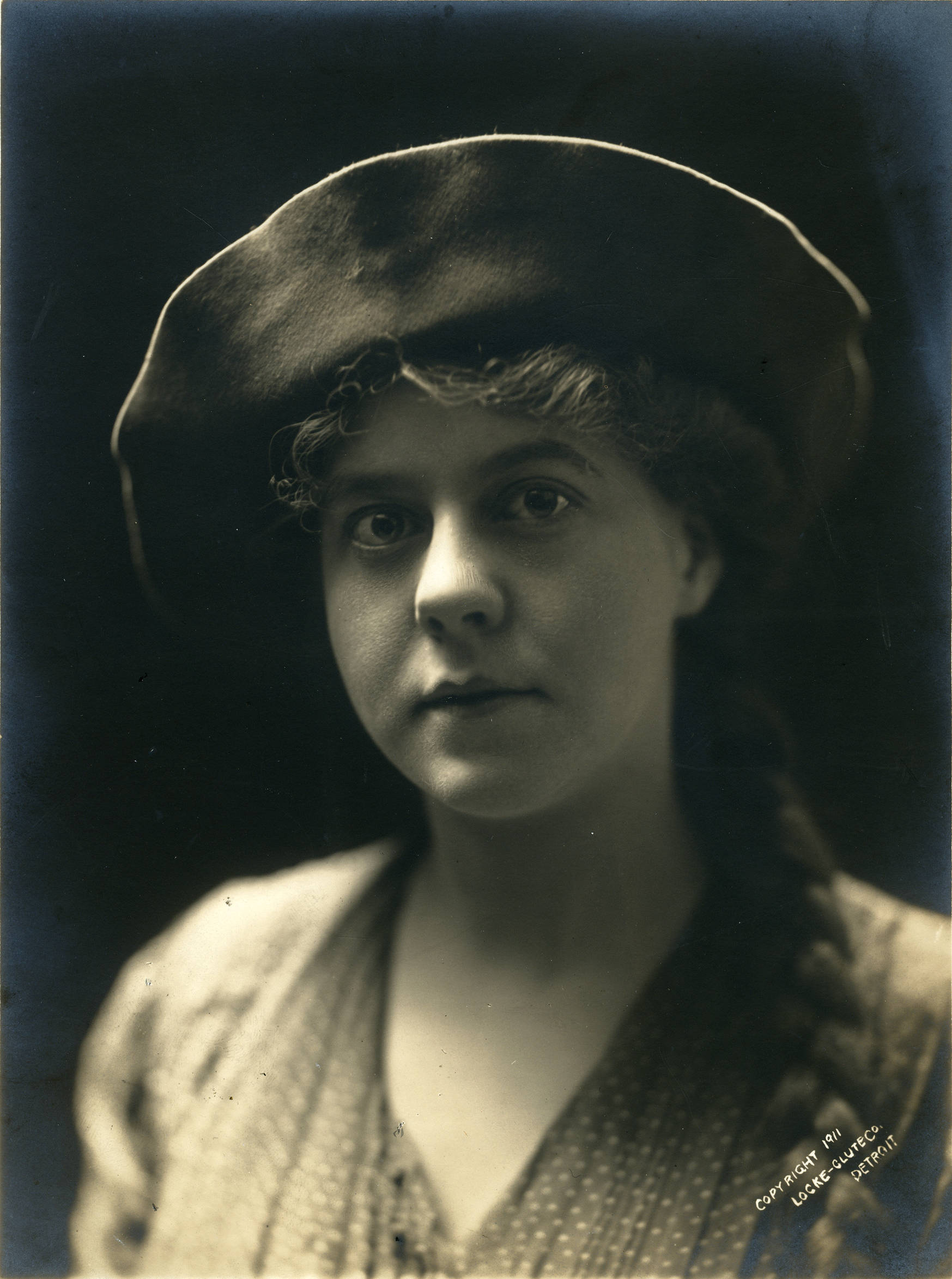
- Spellman in 1911
- Born: Leora Theresa Spellmeyer; July 13, 1888/1890; Bonne Terre, Missouri, U.S.
- Died: September 4, 1945 (aged 57); Los Angeles, California, U.S.
- Resting place: Hollywood Forever Cemetery
- Occupation: Actress
- Years active: 1905–1945
- Spouse: Charles B. Middleton (m. 1908)
- Children: 1

Leora Spellman (born Leora Theresa Spellmeyer; July 13, 1888 or 1890 – September 4, 1945) was an American vaudeville performer and stage and film actress. She was the wife of Charles B. Middleton.

Born Leora Theresa Spellmeyer in Bonne Terre, Missouri, she began singing on stage as a child. As a young lady, she began working in vaudeville where she met and married fellow performer Charles Middleton in 1908. They then teamed up to create a vaudeville act billed as "Middleton and Spellmeyer."

Using the stage name Laura Spellman, she worked primarily in live theater, as did her husband, but in 1920 they made their silent film debut together in "Wits vs. Wits." She continued working on stage, and appeared in only two more films. Her husband eventually built a very successful career as a character actor in film, notably as "Emperor Ming" in the Flash Gordon serials.

Although sixteen years his junior, Leora Spellman predeceased her husband by four years, dying in 1945 in Los Angeles, California from a heart attack. She is interred in the Hollywood Forever Cemetery in Hollywood next to her husband. Although most published sources list the year of her birth as 1890, her gravestone indicates she was born in 1888. The 1900 US Federal Census indicates age 12, with a birth month and year of July 1887, on an information sheet dated June 11, 1900. Ancestry.com
