= Shore Acres (play) =

1892 play by James A. Herne

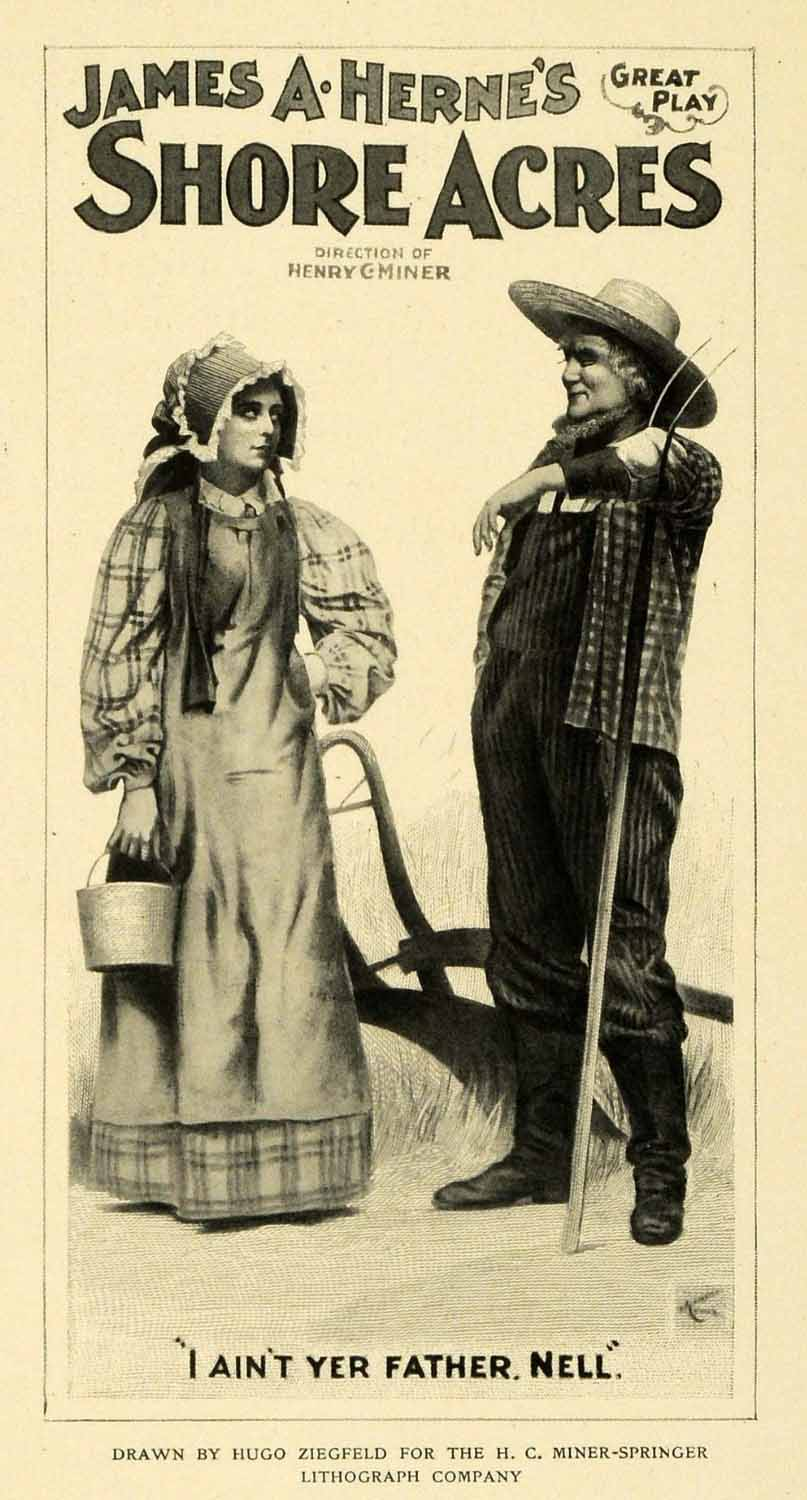
- Poster for an 1898 production
- Written by: James A. Herne
- Original language: English
- Genre: Drama
- Setting: A lighthouse in Maine

Premiere
- Date premiered: May 23, 1892
- Place premiered: McVicker's Theater, Chicago

Shore Acres is four-act a play written by James A. Herne. The play debuted at McVicker's Theater in Chicago on May 23, 1892, initially under the title Shore Acres Subdivision. Later in the Chicago run, it was retitled Uncle Nat. In February 1893, the play opened as Shore Acres at the Boston Museum, where it ran for several months. Following the play's success in Boston, Henry C. Miner staged it on Broadway, where it opened at the Fifth Avenue Theatre on October 30, 1893.

== Cast and characters ==
The characters and opening night cast from the Broadway production are given below:

Opening night cast
Character	Broadway cast
Nathan'l Berry (Uncle Nat)	James A. Herne
Martin Berry	Charles G. Craig
Joel Gates	George W. Wilson
Josiah Blake	Franklin Garland
Sam Warren	David M. Murray
Captain Ben Hutchins	Phineas Leach
Dr. Leonard	James Barrows
Squire Andrews	Alden Bass
Tim Hayes	Carl Fey
Young Nat Berry	Charles B. Hamlin
Ann Berry	Grace Gayler Clark
Helen Berry	Katharine Grey
Perley	Lizzle Corner
Mandy Gates	Florence Richards

== Reception ==
The New York Times gave a positive review to the Broadway production, calling it "more than worth seeing". Critic Alan Dale gave it a positive review in The Evening World. The New-York Tribune reviewer disliked Herne's use of theatrical realism, saying the play was dull and filled with an "interminable mass of insipidities and platitudes". The reviewer for The Sun thought parts of the play were boring, but overall it was "an excellent work".

== Adaptations ==
The play was adapted into a silent film, also titled Shore Acres, in 1914. A second film adaptation, again titled Shore Acres, was released in 1920.
