= George Barnes (cinematographer) =

American cinematographer (1892–1953)

George S. Barnes A.S.C.
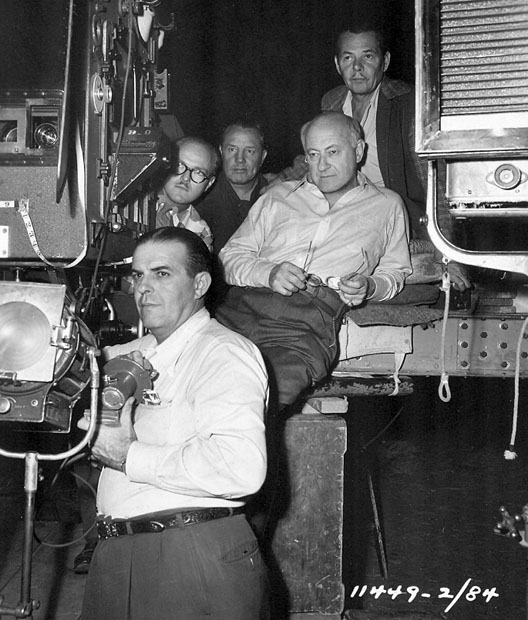
- George Barnes at top right behind Cecil B. DeMille on set of Samson and Delilah (1949)
- Born: October 16, 1892; Pasadena, California, U.S.
- Died: May 30, 1953 (aged 60); Los Angeles, California, U.S.
- Occupation: Cinematographer
- Years active: 1918–1953
- Spouses: Helen Howell (m. 1915, divorced) Ethel Johnson (m. 1923; div. 1923) Marie Namara (m. 1926; div. 1932) Joan Blondell (m. 1933; div. 1936) Elizabeth Wood (m. 1936; div. 1938) Melba Marshall (m. 1939; div. 1945) Margaret Atkinson (m. 1947)
- Children: 4, including Norman Powell

George S. Barnes, A.S.C. (October 16, 1892 – May 30, 1953) was an American cinematographer active from the era of silent films to the early 1950s.

== Biography ==
Over the course of his career, Barnes was nominated for an Academy Award eight times, including for his work on The Devil Dancer (1927) with Gilda Gray and Clive Brook. He won once, for his work on the Alfred Hitchcock film Rebecca (1940). "Barnes’ photographic interpretation of Rebecca is the sort of thing to which his fellow cinematographers may point, as indeed they did in bestowing upon it the industry's premiere Award, as a complete example of what truly great camerawork can mean to a production".

He was married seven times.

His first marriage was to Helen Howell in 1915. They eventually divorced and she would later become the first wife of Frank Capra. He was married to Ethel Johnson from 1923 to 1923, then to Marie Namara from 1926 to 1932.

He was married to Joan Blondell from 1933 to 1936 and filmed five of Blondell's Warner Bros. pictures. In fact, they met on The Greeks Had a Word for Them set in which she had the leading role. Their relationship is often said to have been intense. In an interview, Blondell stated that Barnes cured her from lying. Barnes was the biological father of Blondell's son, the television executive Norman Powell (November 2, 1934 - June 16, 2021), who was adopted in 1938 by Blondell's second husband, actor Dick Powell.

He was married to Elizabeth "Betty" Wood from 1936 to 1938; they had a son named George Carlton Barnes (born December 18, 1937).

Barnes had two daughters with Melba Marshall Kruger (pseudonym of Melba Mae Kruger), to whom he was married from 1939 to 1945: Barbara Ann Barnes (born April 16, 1940) and Georgene S. Barnes (born May 7, 1942).

In 1947, he married for the final time, to Margaret Atkinson.

He died at the age of 60 in Los Angeles, California, after having worked on at least 142 films. He is interred at Hollywood Forever Cemetery in Hollywood, Los Angeles, California.

== Filmography ==
- 1918 Vive la France!
- 1919 Partners Three
- 1919 The Law of Men
- 1919 The Haunted Bedroom
- 1919 The Virtuous Thief
- 1919 Stepping Out
- 1919 What Every Woman Learns
- 1919 Dangerous Hours
- 1920 The Woman in the Suitcase
- 1920 The False Road
- 1920 Hairpins
- 1920 Her Husband's Friend
- 1920 Silk Hosiery
- 1921 The Heart Line
- 1921 The Bronze Bell
- 1921 The Beautiful Gambler
- 1921 Opened Shutters
- 1922 Woman, Wake Up
- 1922 The Real Adventure
- 1922 Dusk to Dawn
- 1922 Conquering the Woman
- 1922 Peg o' My Heart
- 1923 Alice Adams
- 1923 The Love Piker
- 1923 Desire
- 1924 Yolanda
- 1924 Janice Meredith
- 1925 Zander the Great
- 1925 The Teaser
- 1925 The Dark Angel
- 1925 The Eagle
- 1926 Mademoiselle Modiste
- 1926 The Son of the Sheik
- 1926 The Winning of Barbara Worth
- 1927 The Night of Love
- 1927 Venus of Venice
- 1927 The Magic Flame
- 1927 The Devil Dancer
- 1928 Sadie Thompson
- 1928 Two Lovers
- 1928 Our Dancing Daughters
- 1928 The Awakening
- 1929 The Rescue
- 1929 Bulldog Drummond
- 1929 This Is Heaven
- 1929 Condemned
- 1929 The Trespasser
- 1930 Raffles
- 1930 What a Widow!
- 1930 A Lady's Morals
- 1930 The Devil to Pay!
- 1931 One Heavenly Night
- 1931 Five and Ten
- 1931 Street Scene
- 1931 The Unholy Garden
- 1932 The Greeks Had a Word for Them
- 1932 Polly of the Circus
- 1932 The Wet Parade
- 1932 Society Girl
- 1932 Blondie of the Follies
- 1932 Sherlock Holmes
- 1933 Broadway Bad
- 1933 Peg o' My Heart
- 1933 Goodbye Again
- 1933 Footlight Parade
- 1933 Havana Widows
- 1934 Massacre
- 1934 Gambling Lady
- 1934 He Was Her Man
- 1934 Smarty
- 1934 Dames
- 1934 Kansas City Princess
- 1934 Flirtation Walk
- 1935 Gold Diggers of 1935
- 1935 Traveling Saleslady
- 1935 In Caliente
- 1935 Broadway Gondolier
- 1935 The Irish in Us
- 1935 I Live for Love
- 1935 Stars Over Broadway
- 1936 The Singing Kid
- 1936 Love Begins at Twenty
- 1936 Cain and Mabel
- 1937 Black Legion
- 1937 Marked Woman
- 1937 The Prince and the Pauper
- 1937 Ever Since Eve
- 1937 Varsity Show
- 1937 The Barrier
- 1937 Hollywood Hotel
- 1938 Love, Honor and Behave
- 1938 The Beloved Brat
- 1938 Gold Diggers in Paris
- 1939 Devil's Island
- 1939 Jesse James
- 1939 Stanley and Livingstone
- 1939 Here I Am a Stranger (uncredited)
- 1939 Our Neighbors – The Carters
- 1940 Rebecca
- 1940 Free, Blonde and 21
- 1940 Maryland
- 1940 Girl from Avenue A
- 1940 The Return of Frank James
- 1941 Hudson's Bay
- 1941 That Uncertain Feeling
- 1941 Meet John Doe
- 1941 Ladies in Retirement
- 1941 Unholy Partners
- 1941 Remember the Day
- 1942 Sex Hygiene (short)
- 1942 Rings on Her Fingers
- 1942 Broadway
- 1942 Nightmare
- 1942 Once Upon a Honeymoon
- 1943 Mr. Lucky
- 1943 Jane Eyre
- 1944 Since You Went Away (uncredited)
- 1944 Frenchman's Creek
- 1944 None But the Lonely Heart
- 1945 The Spanish Main
- 1945 Spellbound
- 1945 The Bells of St. Mary's
- 1946 From This Day Forward
- 1946 Sister Kenny
- 1947 Sinbad the Sailor
- 1947 Mourning becomes Electra
- 1948 The Emperor Waltz
- 1948 Good Sam
- 1948 No Minor Vices
- 1948 The Boy with Green Hair
- 1948 Force of Evil
- 1949 Samson and Delilah
- 1950 The File on Thelma Jordon
- 1950 Riding High
- 1950 Let's Dance
- 1950 Mr. Music
- 1951 Here Comes the Groom
- 1952 The Greatest Show on Earth
- 1952 Something to Live For
- 1952 Somebody Loves Me
- 1952 Just for You
- 1952 Road to Bali
- 1953 The War of the Worlds
- 1953 Little Boy Lost

== Awards and nominations ==
=== Academy Awards ===
Year	Film	Category	Result
1927/1928	The Devil Dancer	Best Cinematography	Nominated
1927/1928	The Magic Flame	Best Cinematography	Nominated
1927/1928	Sadie Thompson	Best Cinematography	Nominated
1929	Our Dancing Daughters	Best Cinematography	Nominated
1940	Rebecca	Best Cinematography - Black and White	Won
1945	The Spanish Main	Best Cinematography - Color	Nominated
1945	Spellbound	Best Cinematography - Black and White	Nominated
1950	Samson and Delilah	Best Cinematography - Color	Nominated

=== Golden Globes ===
Year	Film	Category	Result
1950	Samson and Delilah	Best Cinematography - Color	Nominated
1952	The Greatest Show on Earth	Best Cinematography - Color	Won
