= Coals of Fire (1918 film) =

- Directed by: Victor Schertzinger
- Screenplay by: R. Cecil Smith
- Produced by: Thomas H. Ince
- Starring: Enid Bennett; Fred Niblo; Melbourne MacDowell; William Elmer; Virginia Southern; J. P. Lockney
- Production company: Famous Players–Lasky Corporation
- Distributed by: Paramount Pictures
- Release date: August 26, 1918
- Running time: 50 minutes
- Country: United States
- Language: English

Coals of Fire is a 1918 American drama silent film directed by Victor Schertzinger and written by R. Cecil Smith. The film stars Enid Bennett, Fred Niblo, Melbourne MacDowell, William Elmer, Virginia Southern and J. P. Lockney. The film was released on August 26, 1918, by Paramount Pictures.

== Plot ==
The young Nell Bradley is regarded with contempt by the inhabitants of the town where she lives because her father is the owner of the local bar, seen as a place of perdition for alcoholics. Charles Alden, the pastor, is attracted to the girl but, when a minor gets sick because a traveling salesman makes her drunk, Alden holds Nell responsible for the fact, even though she has managed to save her with his intervention. Later, Alden discovers the truth. He then offers to send the young woman to school and promises to wait for her until she completes her studies.

== Cast ==
- Enid Bennett as Nell Bradley
- Fred Niblo as Rev. Charles Alden
- Melbourne MacDowell as James Bradley
- William Elmer as Ben Roach
- Virginia Southern as Amy Robinson
- J. P. Lockney as Steve Morrow
- Donald MacDonald as Charles Read
