= When Do We Eat? =

When Do We Eat? may refer to:

- When Do We Eat? (1918 film), a silent comedy directed by Fred Niblo
- When Do We Eat? (2005 film), an American comedy starring Michael Lerner
