= The Bootlegger's Daughter =

1922 film by Victor Schertzinger

- Directed by: Victor Schertzinger
- Written by: R. Cecil Smith
- Starring: Enid Bennett; Fred Niblo; Donald MacDonald
- Cinematography: Chester A. Lyons
- Production company: Playgoers Pictures
- Distributed by: Associated Exhibitors
- Release date: October 6, 1922
- Running time: 50 minutes
- Country: United States
- Languages: Silent; English intertitles

The Bootlegger's Daughter is a 1922 American silent drama film directed by Victor Schertzinger and starring Enid Bennett, Fred Niblo, and Donald MacDonald.

== Cast ==
- Enid Bennett as Nell Bradley
- Fred Niblo as Reverend Charles Alden
- Donald MacDonald as Charles Fuhr
- Melbourne MacDowell as Jim Bradley
- Virginia Southern as Amy Robinson
- William Elmer as Ben Roach
- J.P. Lockney as Phil Glass
- Caroline Rankin as Matilda Boggs
- Otto Hoffman as The Deacon
- Harold Goodwin as Violinist

== Bibliography ==
- James Robert Parish & Michael R. Pitts. Film directors: a guide to their American films. Scarecrow Press, 1974.
