= The Vamp (film) =

1918 film

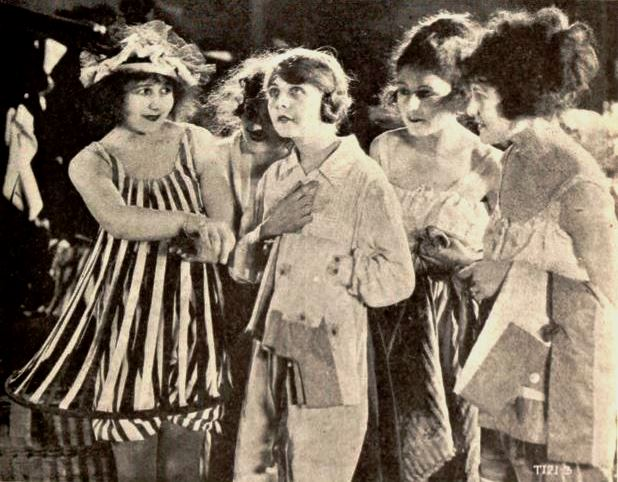
- Film still
- Directed by: Jerome Storm
- Written by: C. Gardner Sullivan; Irvin J. Martin(intertitles)
- Produced by: Thomas H. Ince
- Starring: Enid Bennett; Douglas MacLean
- Cinematography: John S. Stumar
- Distributed by: Famous Players–Lasky; Paramount Pictures
- Release date: July 22, 1918
- Running time: 5 reels
- Country: United States
- Languages: Silent; English intertitles

The Vamp is a lost 1918 American silent wartime comedy-drama film directed by Jerome Storm and starring Enid Bennett and Douglas MacLean. It was produced by Thomas H. Ince with distribution by Paramount Pictures.

== Cast ==
- Enid Bennett as Nancy Lyons
- Douglas MacLean as Robert Walsham
- Charles K. French as James Walsham
- Robert McKim as Phil Weil
- Melbourne MacDowell as Mr. Fleming
- J. P. Lockney as Manus Mulligan
