= Keeping Up with Lizzie =

1921 silent film

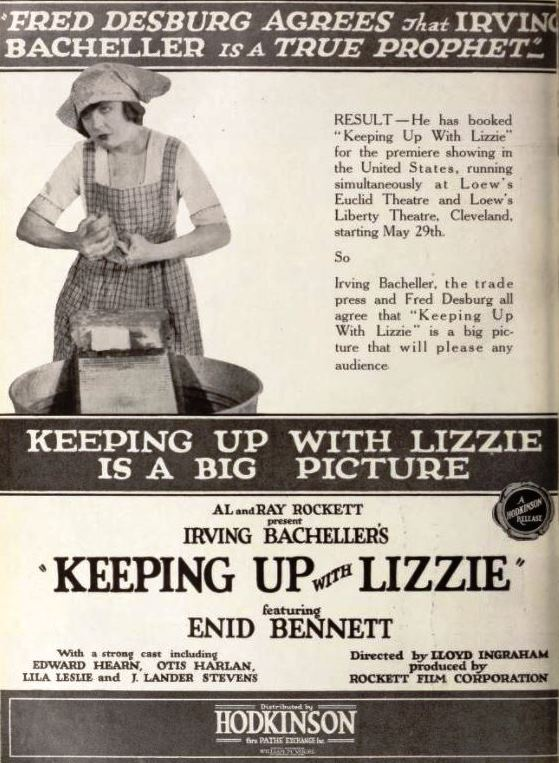
- Directed by: Lloyd Ingraham
- Written by: Irving Bacheller; Will M. Ritchey
- Produced by: Al Rockett; Ray Rockett
- Starring: Enid Bennett; Edward Hearn; Otis Harlan
- Cinematography: Ross Fisher
- Production company: Rockett Film Corporation
- Distributed by: Hodkinson Pictures
- Release date: May 1921
- Running time: 60 minutes
- Country: United States
- Languages: Silent; English intertitles

Keeping Up with Lizzie is a 1921 American silent comedy film directed by Lloyd Ingraham and starring Enid Bennett, Edward Hearn and Otis Harlan.

== Cast ==
- Enid Bennett as Lizzie Henshaw
- Edward Hearn as Dan Pettigrew
- Otis Harlan as Sam Henshaw
- Lila Leslie as Mrs. Warburton
- Landers Stevens as 'Soc' Potter
- Leo White as Count Louis Roland
- Victory Bateman as Mrs. Henshaw
- Harry Todd as Mr. Pettigrew

== Bibliography ==
- Munden, Kenneth White. The American Film Institute Catalog of Motion Pictures Produced in the United States, Part 1. University of California Press, 1997.
