= The Marriage Ring =

1918 film

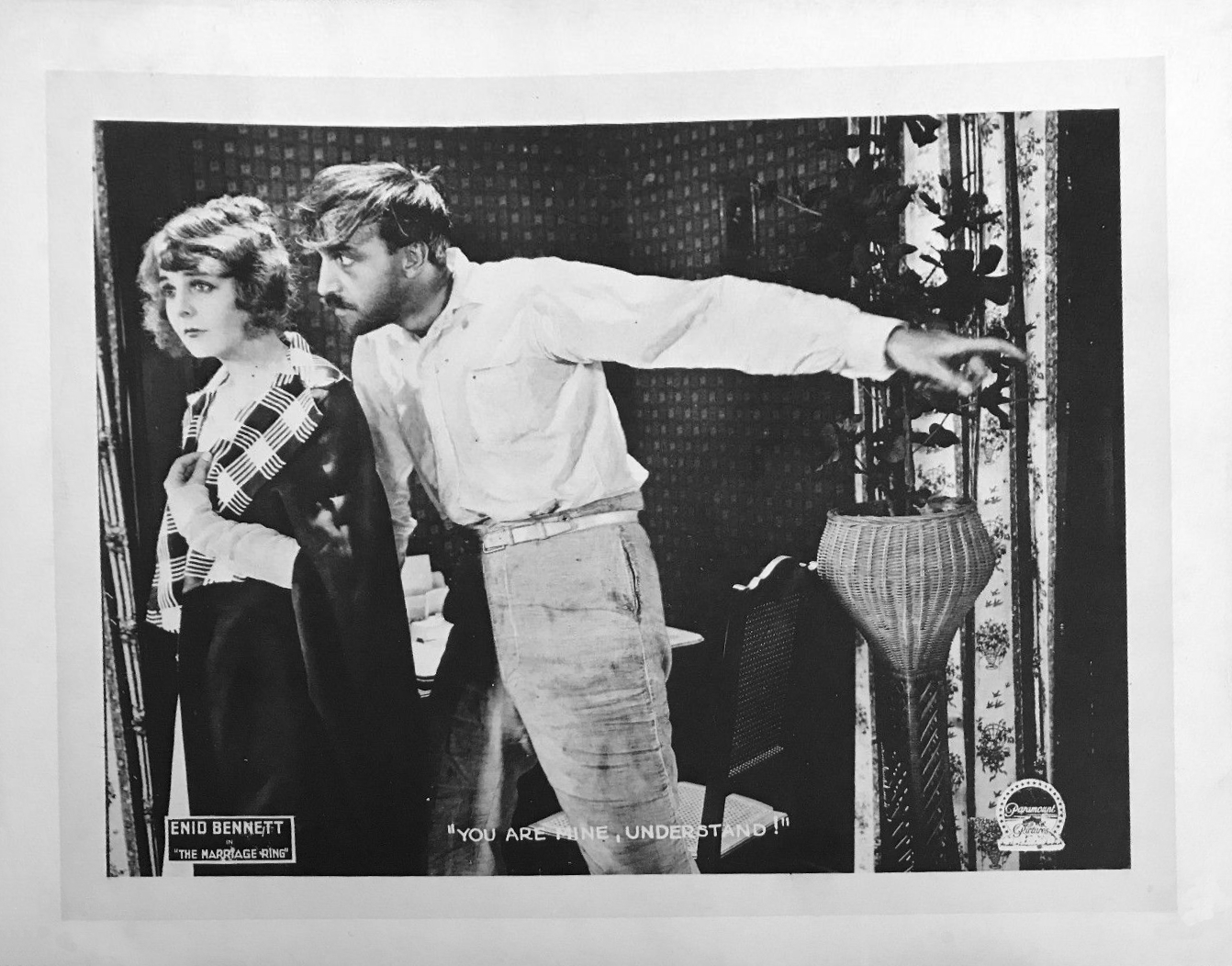
- Lobby card
- Directed by: Fred Niblo
- Written by: John Lynch (story); R. Cecil Smith (scenario)
- Produced by: Thomas H. Ince
- Starring: Enid Bennett; Jack Holt
- Cinematography: John Stumar
- Production company: Thomas H. Ince Corporation
- Distributed by: Famous Players–Lasky; Paramount Pictures
- Release date: August 26, 1918
- Running time: 5 reels
- Country: United States
- Language: Silent (English intertitles)

The Marriage Ring is a lost 1918 American silent drama film directed by Fred Niblo.

== Cast ==
- Enid Bennett as Anne Mertons
- Jack Holt as Rodney Heathe
- Robert McKim as Hugo Mertons
- Maude George as Aho
- Charles K. French as Koske
- Lydia Knott as Mrs. Heathe
- John Cossar as James Ward

== Reception ==
Variety gave a positive review, praising the cast and "atmospheric environment."

== Censorship ==
Like many American films of the time, The Marriage Ring was subject to cuts by city and state film censorship boards. For example, the Chicago Board of Censors required cuts, in Reel 4, of the intertitle "Keep your kisses for your American lover; I have better here", three scenes of man embracing young native woman, all scenes of young woman dancing before men in tent, scene of man cutting telephone wires, and three scenes of man setting grass on fire with torch.
