= Four Cohans =

19th century American vaudeville family act

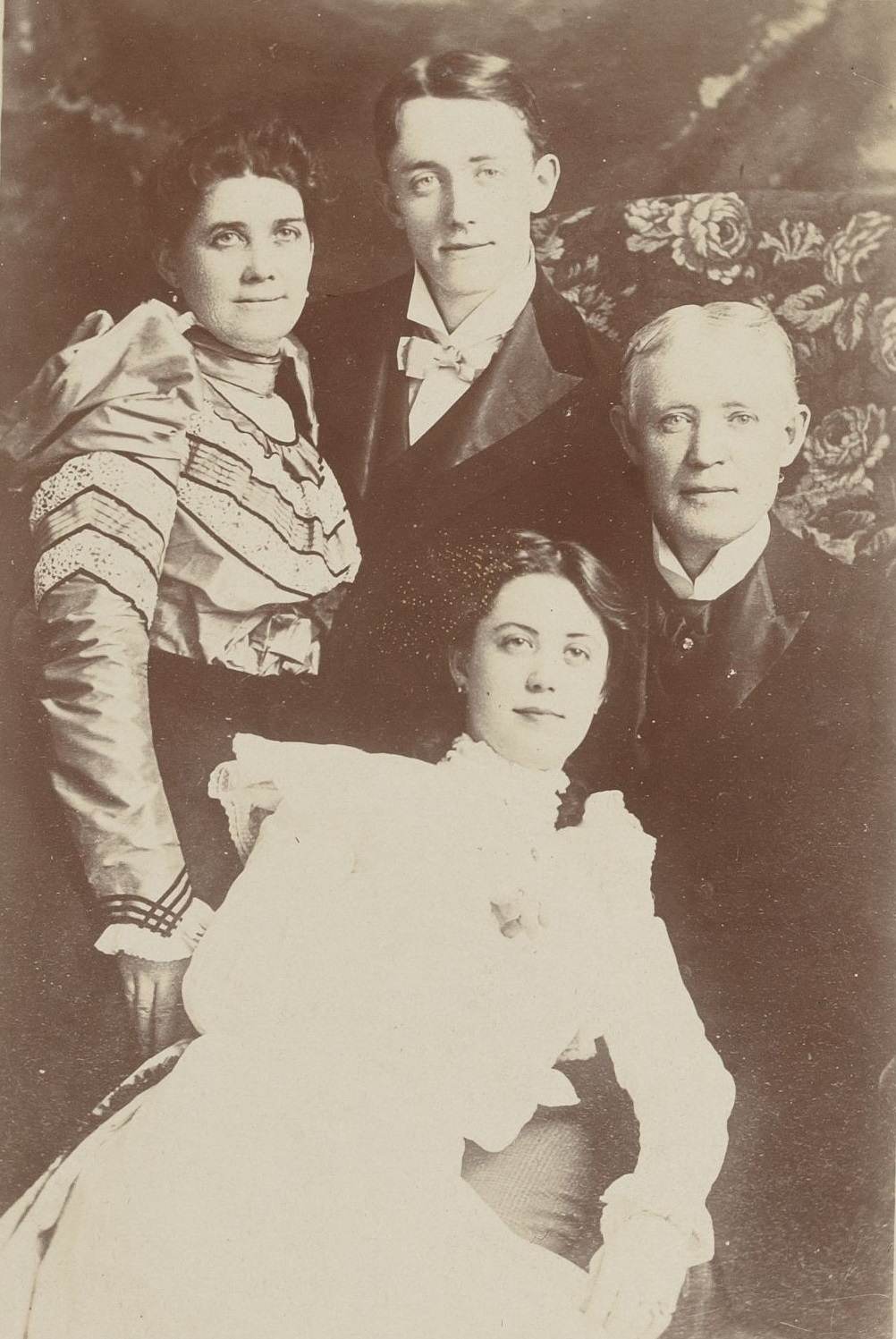
The Four Cohans

The Four Cohans was a late 19th-century American vaudeville family act that introduced 20th-century Broadway legend George M. Cohan to show business. It consisted of father Jeremiah "Jere" Cohan (1848–1917), mother Helen "Nellie" Costigan Cohan (1854–1928), daughter Josephine "Josie" Cohan Niblo (1876–1916), and son George M. Cohan (1878–1942).

By the late 1890s, when the team had become a successful and well-established act in the vaudeville circuits across the country, George Cohan started giving his famous curtain-call speech: "[L]adies and gentlemen, my father thanks you, my mother thanks you, my sister thanks you, and I thank you". The act disbanded in 1900 when George left vaudeville for Broadway.

Josie, who died of heart disease at a young age, was married to Fred Niblo Sr. (1874–1948), an important director of silent films, including Ben Hur (1925), and a founder of the Academy of Motion Picture Arts and Sciences. Their son, Fred Niblo Jr. (1903–1973) was a screenwriter.

The Four Cohans are all buried at the family plot at Woodlawn Cemetery in The Bronx, New York.
