= Hairpins (film) =

1920 film

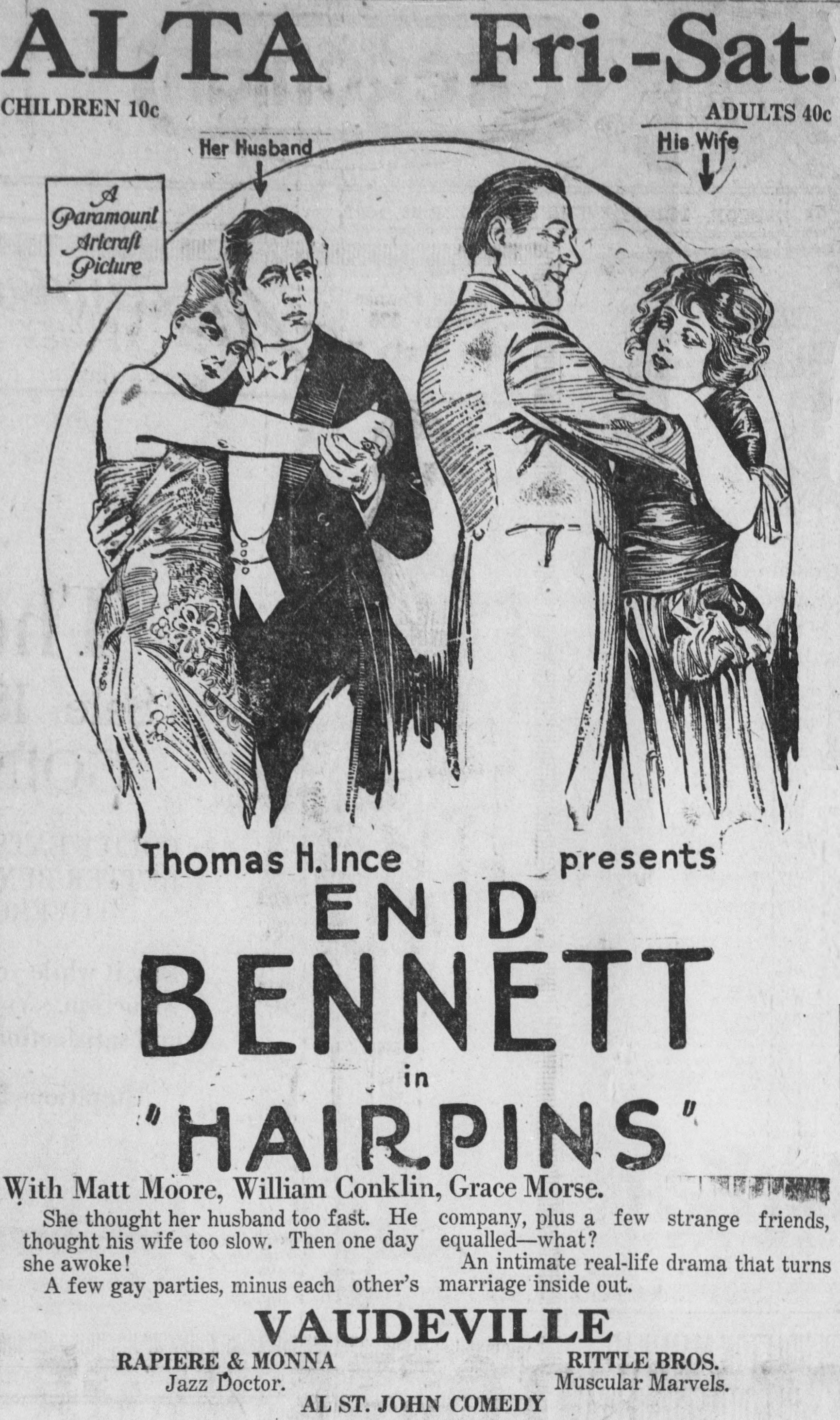
- Newspaper advertisement
- Directed by: Fred Niblo
- Written by: C. Gardner Sullivan
- Produced by: Thomas H. Ince
- Starring: Enid Bennett; Matt Moore
- Cinematography: George Barnes
- Edited by: W. Duncan Mansfield
- Distributed by: Paramount Pictures
- Release date: August 1, 1920
- Running time: 50 minutes
- Country: United States
- Language: Silent (English intertitles)

Hairpins is a 1920 American silent drama film directed by Fred Niblo. A surviving print is held in a private collection.

== Plot ==
The disgust of Rex Rossmore at the hairpin-strewing, straggly locks of his young bride Muriel and her over-fastidious housekeeping make it easy for him to forsake her company outside the home for that of his stenographer Effie Wainwright. Overhearing her husband's confession of her failure as a wife as he makes it to his employer, she considers suicide. Making herself orderly for death, she discovers that she is beautiful in life, and conceives a plan whereby she plays an affair of her own against that of her husband and stenographer, acquaints herself with the ways of the gay world and practices them until her husband's rage brings issue to their artificial existences. This reveals to the man that his love is to the woman herself, after all, and not to her fashionable habiliments. This readjustment is certain to reflect a compromise in several things after a reconciliation is brought about after the husband discovers that another man is in love with his wife.

== Cast ==
- Enid Bennett as Muriel Rossmore
- Matt Moore as Rex Rossmore
- William Conklin as Hal Gordon
- Margaret Livingston as Effie Wainwright
- Grace Morse as Mrs. Kent
- Al W. Filson as John Burman (credited as Al Filson)
- Aggie Herring as The Maid
