= Rose o' the Sea =

1922 film

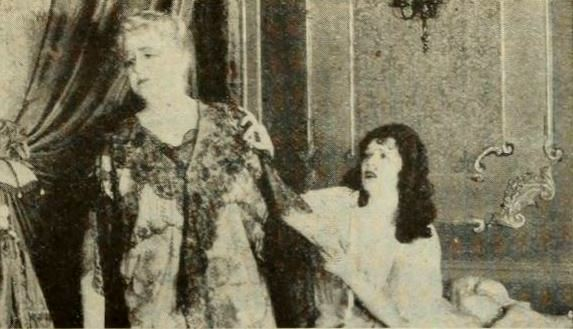
- Film still with Kate Lester and Anita Stewart
- Directed by: Fred Niblo
- Written by: Bess Meredyth; Oliver Sandys; Madge Tyrone
- Produced by: Louis B. Mayer; Anita Stewart
- Starring: Anita Stewart; Rudolph Cameron
- Cinematography: Dal Clawson
- Distributed by: First National
- Release date: July 1922
- Country: United States
- Language: Silent (English intertitles)

Rose o' the Sea is a lost 1922 American silent drama film directed by Fred Niblo.

== Cast ==
- Anita Stewart as Rose Elton
- Rudolph Cameron as Elliot Schuyler
- Thomas Holding as Peter Schuyler
- Margaret Landis as Vivienne Raymond
- Kate Lester as Lady Maggie
- Hallam Cooley as Roger Walton
- J. P. Lockney as Daddy Eton (as John P. Lockney)
- Charles Belcher as George Thornton
