= The Red Lily =

1924 film by Fred Niblo

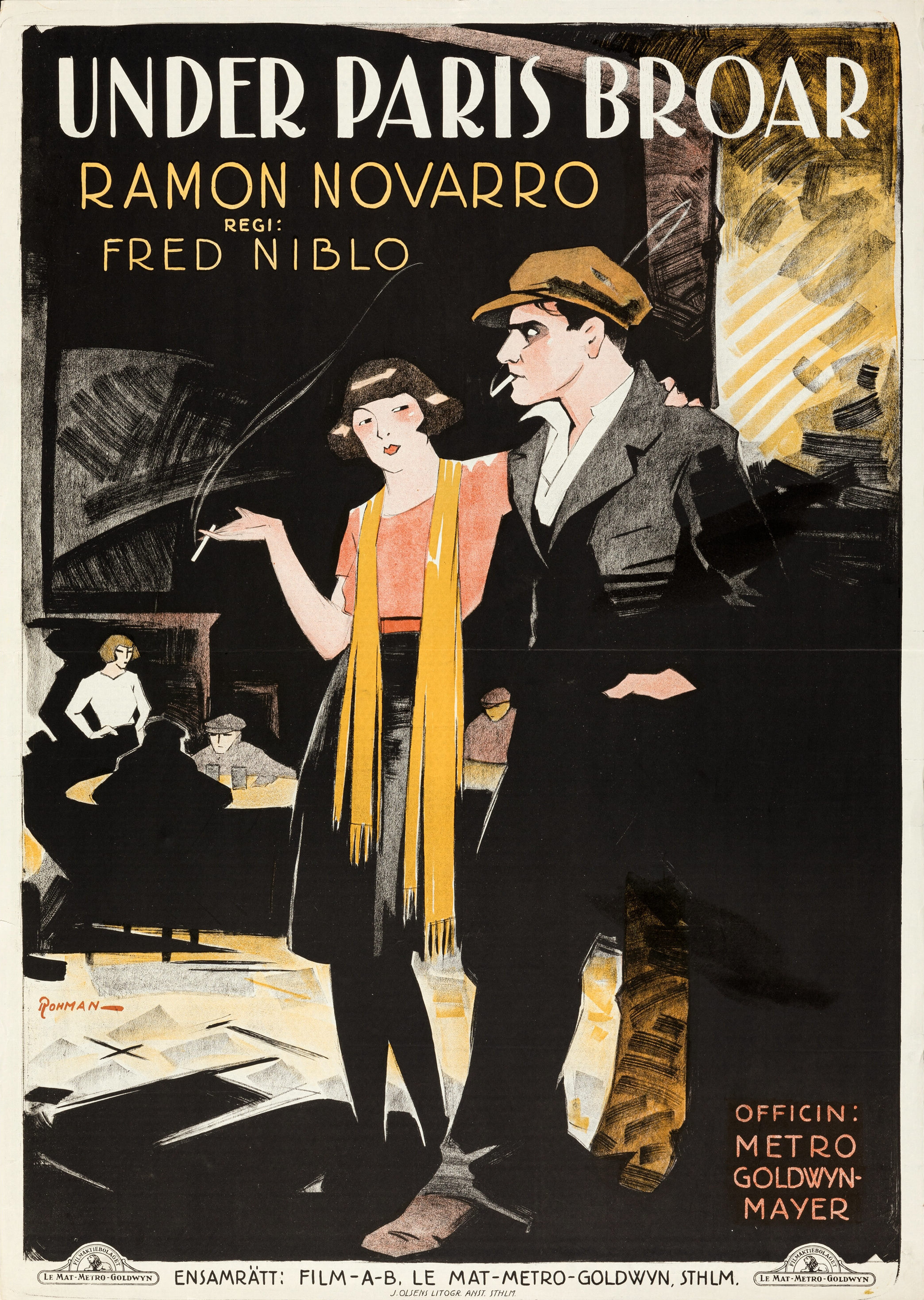
- Swedish theatrical release poster
- Directed by: Fred Niblo
- Written by: Fred Niblo; Bess Meredyth
- Produced by: Fred Niblo
- Starring: Ramon Novarro; Enid Bennett
- Cinematography: Victor Milner
- Edited by: Lloyd Nosler
- Distributed by: Metro-Goldwyn
- Release date: September 8, 1924
- Running time: 81 minutes
- Country: United States
- Language: Silent (English intertitles)

The Red Lily is a 1924 American silent drama film directed by Fred Niblo and starring Ramon Novarro, Enid Bennett, and Wallace Beery. According to the Library of Congress, a print of the film exists with German intertitles.

== Plot ==
The Red Lily (1924)

Marise La Noue is the daughter of a cobbler in Vivonne, France. She and Jean Leonnec, the son of Mayor Hugo Leonnec, are in love. One day her father dies and she goes to his shop Marise to mourn his death. However, the shop is now own by a distant relative and Marise is left with nothing. Walking on the road, Marise arrives at a cottage where she meets a family having dinner. However, the father drives Marise out of his home and into a thunderstorm. Meanwhile, Jean tells his father Hugo that he will marry Marise when he is of age.

That same night, Marise meets Jean at an abandoned cottage. They cuddle together near a fire overnight; Marise asks Jean not to return to Hugo. The next morning, Hugo finds the couple together. When he asks Marise to leave town, Jean decides to go with her. The couple then leave for Paris.

Back in Vivonne, Hugo discovers that someone stole money from his treasury safe. He immediately assumes that Jean was the thief. When Marise and Jean arrive in Paris, he leaves their room to find out where they get married. However, Jean is arrested by the police and transported back to Vivonne.

Marise waits patiently for Jean, but he doesn't return. Hours later, Jean escape the detectives and races back to Paris, but he finds Marise is gone. Back in Vivonne, detectives apprehend the real thief of the treasury money.

Thinking he is still a wanted fugitive, Jean meets Bo-Bo, a clever pickpocket, along the Seine River. Jean tells Bo-Bo about his search for Marise, whom he describes as an angel. Bo-Bo takes a strong liking to Jean, and teaches him how to become a thief.

Months pass, with Marise working at a factory. Her boss makes a sexual advance towards her, but she refuses it. Meanwhile, at a local bar, Nana, a prostitute, flirts with Jean but he ignores her. Sometime later, Marise's factory closes and she is unemployed. Desperate for money, and Marise starts working as a prostitute.

Jean spots Marise outside a Paris train station and takes her to his hideout. He is shocked at her condition and that she has been a prostitute. Enraged, Jean strikes Marise and leaves the hideout, wandering alone on the street. A police officer spots Jean and tries to arrest him. Jean escapes, but is wounded. He returns to the hideout, leaving a trail of blood behind him. When the police arrive, Jean hides in a closet. When questioned about the blood trail, Marise tells the police that she cut herself. The next morning, Marise nurses Jean's wounds. Afraid of capture, Jean stays with Marise.

Bo-Bo later takes Jean to the bar. There, Jean welcomes Nana's flirtations; when Marise arrives, he rejects her. The policemen storm the bar looking for Jean, and accidentally shoot Marise. Jean escapes into the sewers. He later returns to the bar, where he learns Marise is in critical condition at a hospital. While at the hospital, he prays for Marise's recovery. The police later arrest Jean and he is sent to prison; he does not learn that Marise is alive. Two years later, Marise is working as a seamstress. When Jean is released from prison, he reunites with her. They travel back to Vivonne with Bo-Bo.

== Cast ==
- Ramon Novarro as Jean Leonnec
- Enid Bennett as Marise La Noue
- Frank Currier as Hugo Leonnec
- Mitchell Lewis as D'Agut
- Rosita Marstini as Madame Charpied (as Risita Marstini)
- Sidney Franklin as M. Charpied - Her Husband
- Wallace Beery as Bo-Bo
- George Nichols as Concierge
- Emily Fitzroy as Mama Bouchard
- George Periolat as Papa Bouchard
- Rosemary Theby as Nana
- Milla Davenport as Madame Poussot
- Gibson Gowland as Le Turc
- Dick Sutherland as The Toad
- Marcelle Corday as Woman in bar (uncredited)

== Censorship concerns ==
The film industry created the National Association of the Motion Picture Industry in 1916 in an effort to preempt censorship by states and municipalities. It formulated a list of subjects called the "Thirteen Points" which film plots were to avoid. However, the list did not ban depictions of prostitution so long as it was not forcible (i.e., white slavery) and the film did not show actual sex work.

Despite the Association guidelines, The Red Lily still endured multiple cuts in Kansas by the censors on the Kansas Board of Review.
