= Enid Bennett =

Australian actress (1893–1969)

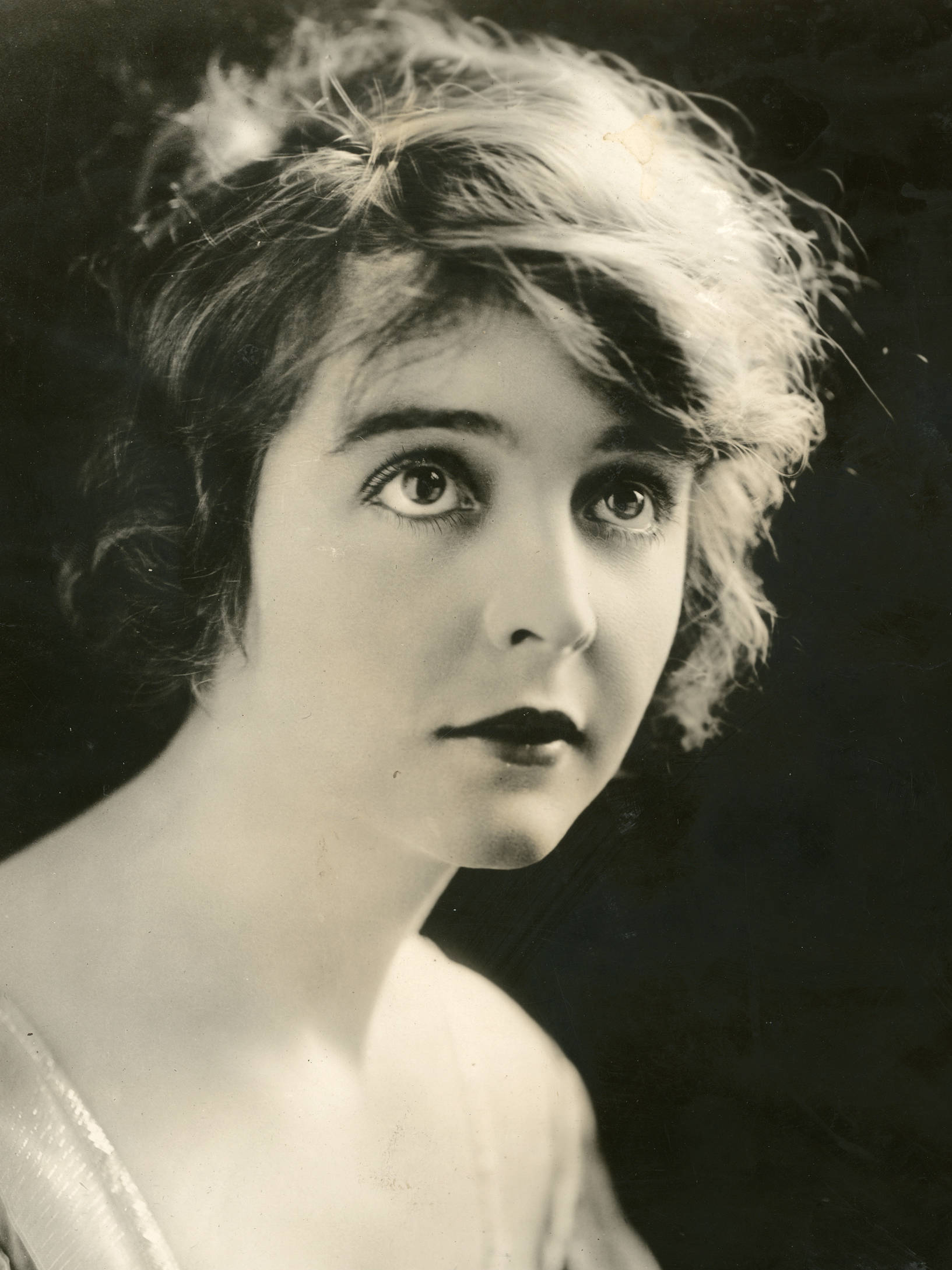
- Bennett in 1918
- Born: 15 July 1893; York, Western Australia, Australia
- Died: 14 May 1969 (aged 75); Malibu, California, U.S.
- Occupation: Actress
- Years active: 1916–1941
- Spouses: Fred Niblo (m. 1918; died 1948) Sidney Franklin (m. 1963)
- Children: 3
- Relatives: Marjorie Bennett (sister)

Enid Eulalie Bennett (15 July 1893 – 14 May 1969) was an Australian silent film actress, mostly active in American film.

== Early life ==
Bennett was born on 15 July 1893 in York, Western Australia, the daughter of Nellie Mary Louise (née Walker) and Frank Bennett. She had an older brother, Francis Reginald "Reg" Bennett (born 1891), and a younger sister, actress Marjorie Bennett (born 1896). After an unsuccessful attempt to start his own school, Frank took up the role of headmaster at the newly established Guildford Grammar School in 1896. He died in 1898, when he drowned in a river while suffering from depression. Nellie later married the new headmaster, Alexander Gillespie, in 1899. With him, she had a daughter named Catherine (born 1901) and a son named Alexander (born 1903). Following Gillespie's death in 1903, Nellie supported her five children by working as a school matron.

Bennett attended Lionel Logue's acting and elocution classes in Perth, and after receiving encouragement from a visiting actress in 1910, she joined a touring company. By 1912, Bennett had joined the Fred Niblo-Josephine Cohan touring company, performing comedies around Australia and understudying for Cohan herself, for which she received consistently positive reviews. Her family had moved to Sydney by this time. In 1917, Reg was killed during the Battle of Passchendaele while serving with the First Australian Imperial Force.

== Career ==
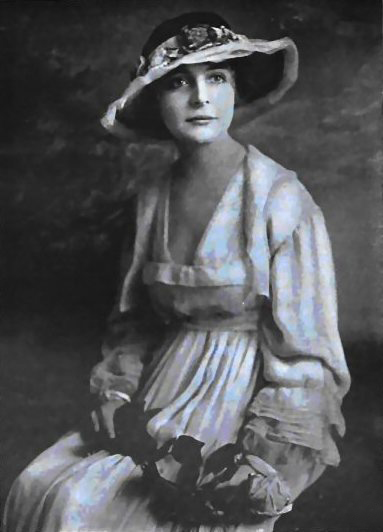
Bennett c. 1920

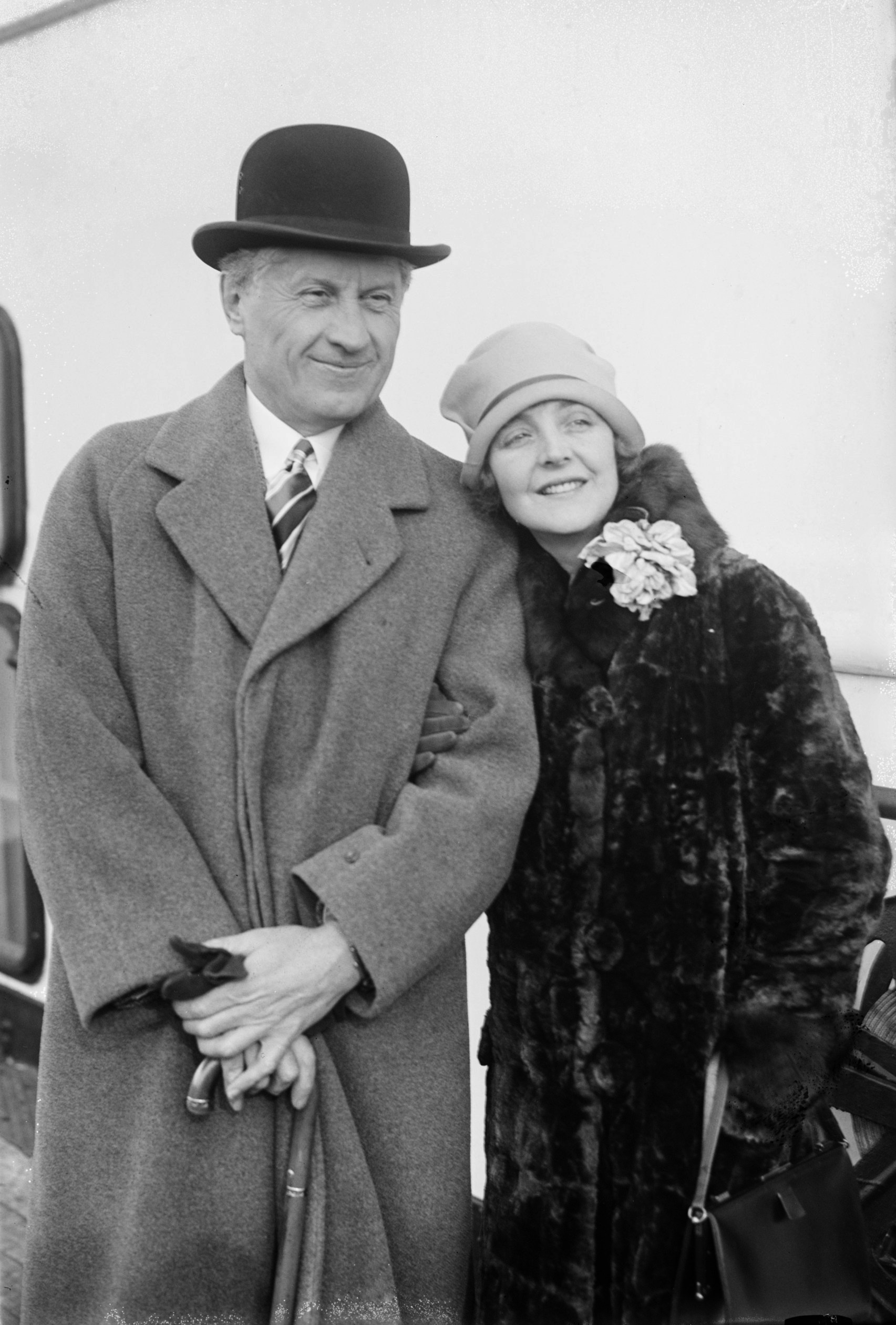
Bennett with husband Fred Niblo in 1926

In the early part of 1915, theatre agents J. C. Williamson's decided to make short films of some of their popular plays, to forestall the release of imported American filmed versions. They used Niblo as director, and members of his troupe appeared in Get-Rich-Quick Wallingford and Officer 666. Enid Bennett appeared in both. Three reels of Officer 666 survive today in the National Film and Sound Archive. Film historians Andrew Pike and Ross Cooper describe it as "a crude production doggedly faithful to the stage." Both films were released in Australia after Bennett left for the United States in June 1915, travelling with Niblo and Cohan.

Her first appearance in the U.S. was in Henry Arthur Jones' play Cock o' the Walk at George M. Cohan's Theatre on Broadway in late 1915. Roles of increasing importance in films followed soon after. One of her most important early films was The Little Brother in 1917, where she appeared opposite William Garwood. This brought her to the attention of studios, in particular Thomas H. Ince, who signed her up with the Triangle Film Corporation. From 1918 to 1921, she starred in 23 films, becoming well established as an actress and attracting great publicity and consistently positive reviews. In 1922, she starred in three films, one of which became her most famous role, the female lead of Maid Marian in Robin Hood with Douglas Fairbanks. Interviewed in the 1960s by Kevin Brownlow, Bennett said, "I had a wonderful time playing Maid Marian. Of course, the part was not too demanding, I just walked through it in a queenly manner. [Fairbanks] was wonderful, inspiring."

Following Josephine Cohan's death, Bennett married Fred Niblo in 1918. In 1924, she appeared opposite Ramon Novarro in Niblo's film Red Lily. Between 1923 and 1928 her career had slowed and she appeared in leading roles in fewer films. She made a transition to sound, appearing in two 1931 Jackie Cooper-Robert Coogan films: Skippy (which was nominated for an Academy Award for Best Picture) and its sequel Sooky. Later at the end of the decade she appeared in a few minor roles, the last being the Marx Brothers 1941 film The Big Store. Niblo had retired in 1933, and it appears Bennett did also.

In later life, sister Marjorie Bennett explained that, somewhat against her will, she had been encouraged by the family to join Bennett to keep her company in the U.S. By the mid-1920s, her mother Nellie, both her sisters, and her surviving brother were living in the U.S. In 1934, her brother Alexander married actress Frances Lee. The wedding was attended by some of Hollywood's biggest names, including Gloria Swanson and Greta Garbo.

== Personal life and death ==
In 1918, Bennett married Fred Niblo. In 1922, she and Niblo had their first child, a daughter named Loris. A son, Peter, was born later that year, and another daughter, Judith, was born in 1928. Niblo died in 1948. In 1963, she married American film director Sidney Franklin. In later life, she resided in Malibu, California.

Niblo and Bennett commissioned architect Wallace Neff to design their house on Angelo Drive, which they named Misty Mountain. It was completed in 1926 and sold by the couple to Jules Stein in 1940 after a decline in their fortunes.

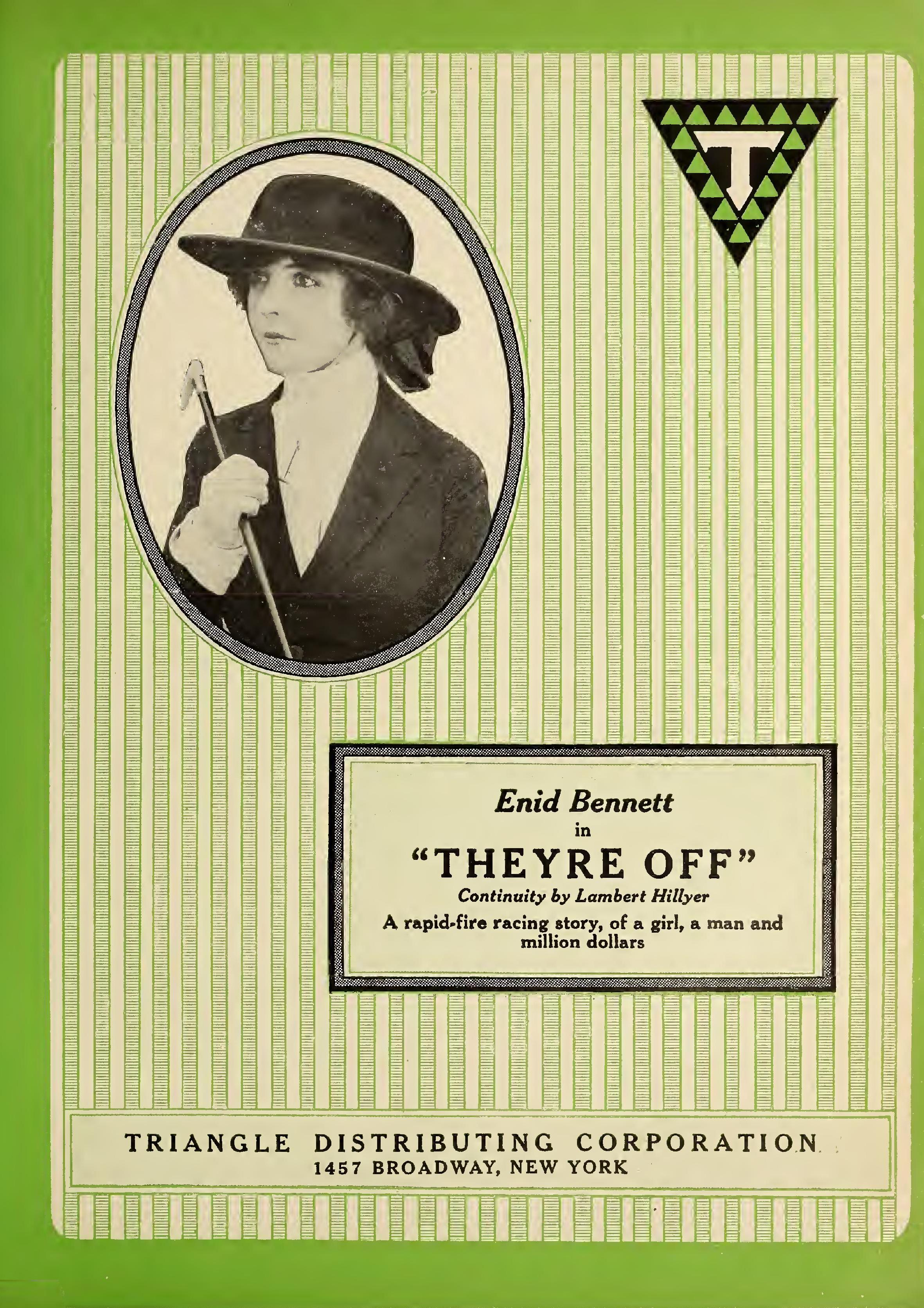
Enid Bennett in They're Off ad from Motion Picture News, 1917

On 14 May 1969, Bennett died at her home in Malibu, California, aged 75.

== Partial filmography ==
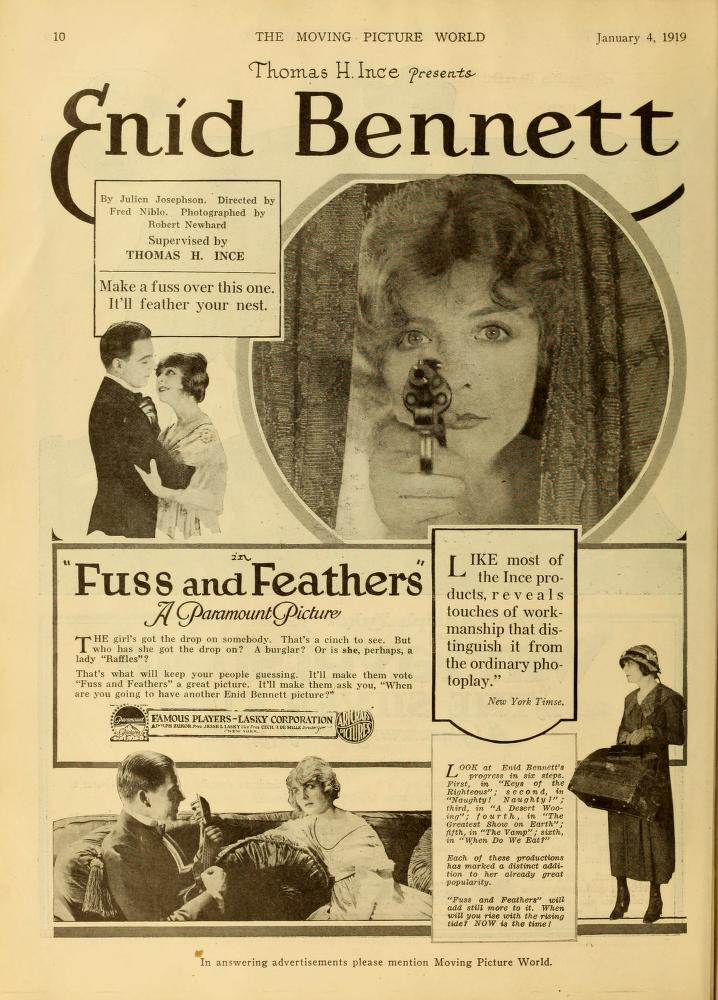
Fuss and Feathers (1918)

- Get-Rich-Quick Wallingford (1916) as Fanny
- Officer 666 (1916) as Helen Burton
- The Aryan (1916) as Minor Role
- Princess of the Dark (1917) as Fay Herron
- The Little Brother (1917) as Jerry Ross
- Happiness (1917) as Doris Wingate
- The Girl, Glory (1917) as Glory Wharton
- The Mother Instinct (1917) as Eleanor Coutierre
- Keys of the Righteous (1918) as Mary Manning
- Naughty, Naughty! (1918) as Roberta Miller
- The Biggest Show on Earth (1918) as Roxie Kemp
- A Desert Wooing (1918) as Avice Bereton
- The Vamp (1918) as Nancy Lyons
- They're Off (1918) as Rita Hackett
- The Marriage Ring (1918) as Anne Mertons
- Coals of Fire (1918) as Nell Bradley
- When Do We Eat? (1918) as Nora
- Fuss and Feathers (1918, unknown / presumably lost film) as Susie Baldwin
- Happy Though Married (1919) as Millicent Lee
- Partners Three (1919) as Agnes Cuyler
- The Law of Men (1919, lost film) as Laura Dayne
- The Haunted Bedroom (1919, lost film) as Betsy Thorne
- The Virtuous Thief (1919, lost film) as Shirley Armitage
- Stepping Out (1919) as Mrs.Robert Hillary
- What Every Woman Learns (1919) as Amy Fortesque
- The Woman in the Suitcase (1920) as Mary Moreland
- The False Road (1920) as Betty Palmer
- Hairpins (1920) as Muriel Rossmore
- Her Husband's Friend (1920) as Judith Westover
- Silk Hosiery (1920) as Marjorie Bowen
- Keeping Up with Lizzie (1921) as Lizzie Henshaw
- The Bootlegger's Daughter (1922) as Nell Bradley
- Robin Hood (1922) as Lady Marian Fitzwalter
- Scandalous Tongues (1922)
- Your Friend and Mine (1923) as Patricia Stanton
- Strangers of the Night (1923, lost film) as Poppy Faire
- The Bad Man (1923) as Mrs. Morgan Pell
- The Courtship of Miles Standish (1923, unknown / presumably lost) as Priscilla Mullens
- A Fool's Awakening (1924) as Olivia Gale
- The Sea Hawk (1924) as Lady Rosamund Godolphin
- The Red Lily (1924) as Marise La Noue
- A Woman's Heart (1926) as Eve Allen Waring
- The Wrong Mr. Wright (1927) as Henrietta
- Skippy (1931) as Mrs. Ellen Skinner
- Waterloo Bridge (1931) as Mrs. Wetherby
- Sooky (1931) as Mrs. Skinner
- Intermezzo (1939) as Greta Stenborg
- Meet Dr. Christian (1939) as Anne Hewitt
- Strike Up the Band (1940) as Mrs. Morgan
- The Big Store (1941) as Clerk (uncredited) (final film role)
