= The Brute Master =

1920 silent film

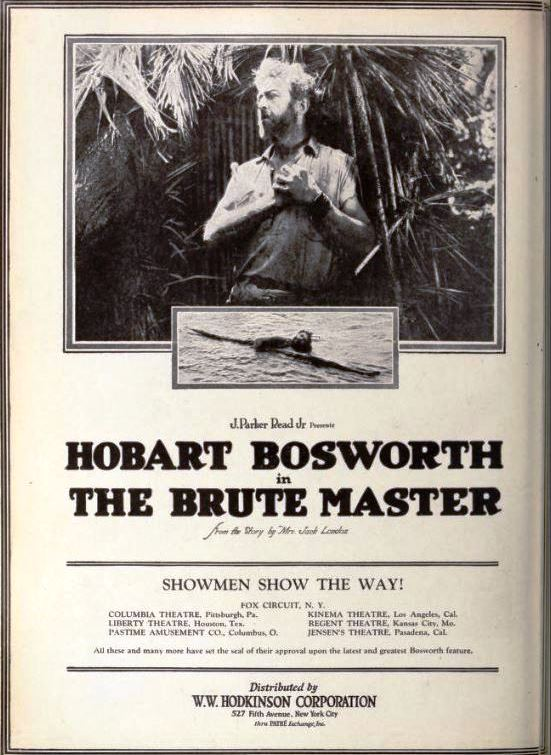
- Directed by: Roy Marshall
- Written by: Charmian London; Hobart Bosworth; Ralph Dixon
- Produced by: J. Parker Read Jr.
- Starring: Hobart Bosworth; Anna Q. Nilsson; William Conklin
- Cinematography: J.O. Taylor
- Edited by: Ralph Dixon
- Production company: J. Parker Read Jr. Productions
- Distributed by: Hodkinson Pictures
- Release date: November 28, 1920
- Running time: 50 minutes
- Country: United States
- Languages: Silent; English intertitles
- Budget: $95,839

The Brute Master is a 1920 American silent drama film directed by Roy Marshall and starring Hobart Bosworth, Anna Q. Nilsson and William Conklin.

== Cast ==
- Hobart Bosworth as Bucko McAllister, The Brute Master
- Anna Q. Nilsson as Madeline Grey
- William Conklin as Walter Maxwell
- Margaret Livingston as The Native 'Taupou'

== Bibliography ==
- Taves, Brian. Thomas Ince: Hollywood's Independent Pioneer. University Press of Kentucky, 2012.
