= Flare-Up Sal =

Flare-Up Sal (aka:Flare-Up Sal of Jimtown)
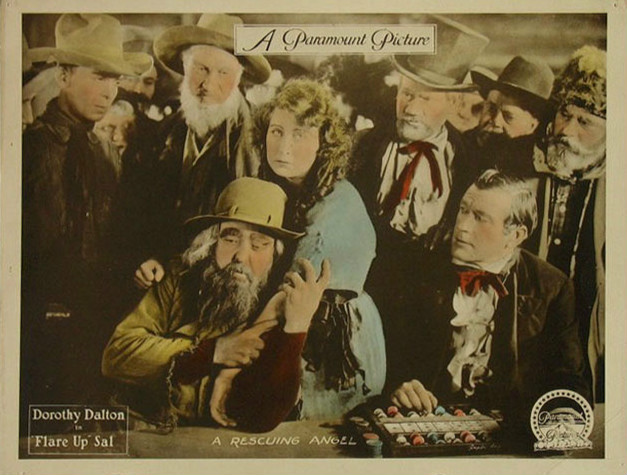
- Lobby card
- Directed by: Roy William Neill
- Written by: J. G. Hawks
- Produced by: Thomas H. Ince
- Starring: Dorothy Dalton
- Cinematography: John S. Stumar
- Distributed by: Famous Players–Lasky; Paramount Pictures
- Release date: February 4, 1918
- Running time: 5 reels
- Country: United States
- Language: Silent (English intertitles)

Flare-Up Sal is a surviving 1918 American silent drama film directed by Roy William Neill and starring Dorothy Dalton. Thomas H. Ince produced and released through Paramount Pictures.

== Cast ==
- Dorothy Dalton as Flare-Up Sal
- Thurston Hall as The Red Rider
- William Conklin as Dandy Dave Hammond
- J. P. Lockney as Tin Cup Casey
- Milton Ross as Lige Higbee

unbilled

- Frank Daniels
- Kelson Falkenberg
- Burton Halbert
- Roy William Neill
- Catherine Proudfit

== Preservation status ==
A print of Flare-Up Sal is preserved in the Library of Congress collection.
