= Up and Going =

1922 silent film

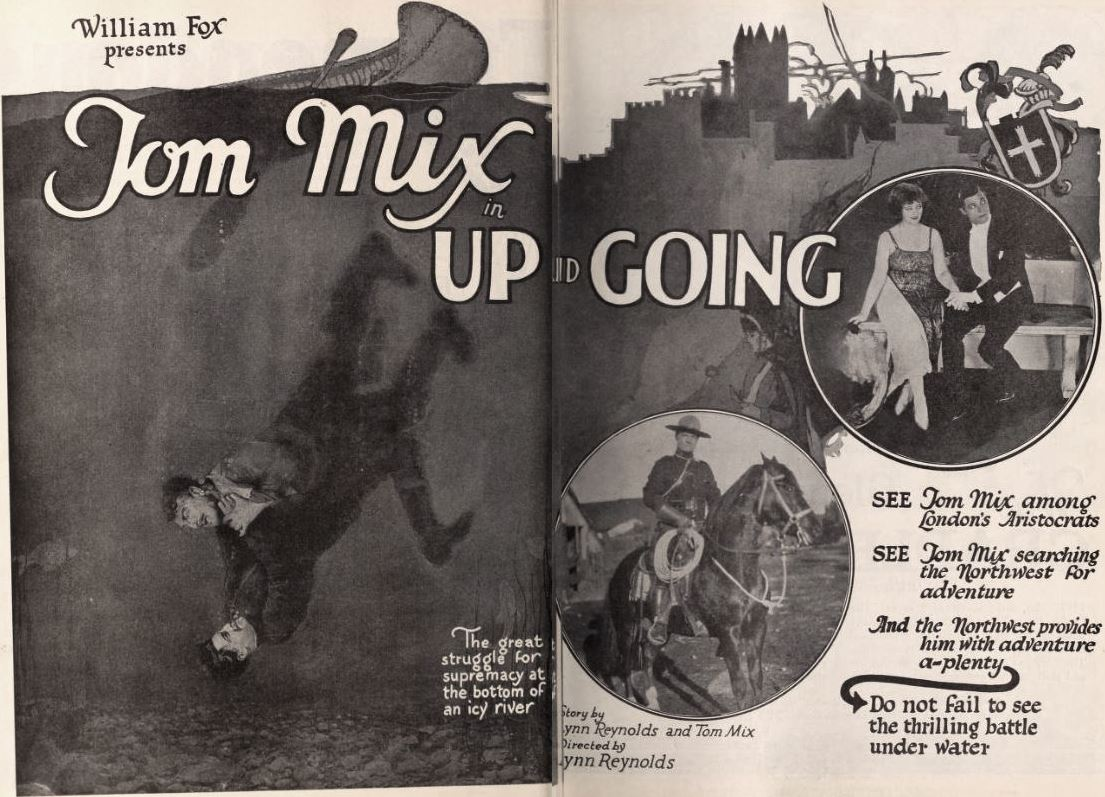
- Directed by: Lynn Reynolds
- Written by: Tom Mix; Lynn Reynolds
- Produced by: William Fox
- Starring: Tom Mix; Eva Novak; William Conklin
- Cinematography: Daniel B. Clark; Benjamin H. Kline
- Production company: Fox Film
- Distributed by: Fox Film
- Release date: April 2, 1922
- Running time: 50 minutes
- Country: United States
- Languages: Silent; English intertitles

Up and Going is a 1922 American silent adventure film directed by Lynn Reynolds and starring Tom Mix, Eva Novak and William Conklin.

== Cast ==
- Tom Mix as David Brandon (in play)
- Eva Novak as Jackie McNabb (in play)
- William Conklin as Basil Du Bois (in play)
- Sid Jordan as Louis Patie (in play)
- Tom O'Brien as Sergeant Langley (in play)
- Pat Chrisman as Sandy McNabb (in play)
- Paul Weigel as Father Le Claire (in play)
- Cecil Van Auker as Albert Brandon (in prologue)
- Carol Holloway as Marie Brandon (in prologue)
- Helen Field as Jacquette McNabb (in prologue)
- Marion Feducha as David Brandon (in prologue)

== Bibliography ==
- Solomon, Aubrey. The Fox Film Corporation, 1915-1935: A History and Filmography. McFarland, 2011.
