= The Haunted Bedroom =

1919 film

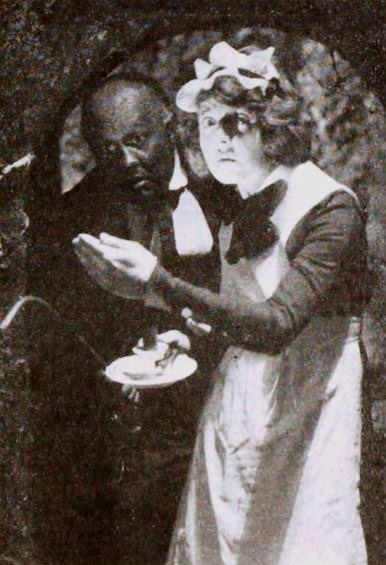
- Still showing Enid Bennett (right) with unidentified actor
- Directed by: Fred Niblo
- Written by: C. Gardner Sullivan
- Produced by: Thomas H. Ince
- Starring: Enid Bennett; Dorcas Matthews
- Cinematography: George Barnes
- Production company: Thomas H. Ince Corporation
- Distributed by: Famous Players–Lasky Corporation
- Release date: May 25, 1919
- Running time: 5 reels
- Country: United States
- Language: Silent (English intertitles)

The Haunted Bedroom is a lost 1919 American silent drama film directed by Fred Niblo and starring Enid Bennett and Dorcas Matthews. The film was also distributed under the title The Ghost of Whispering Oaks.

== Plot ==
As described in a film magazine, New York reporter Betsy Thorne travels to the railroad station in a Southern state to investigate a missing man where she overhears a conversation between the sheriff and an imported detective that reporters are barred from the house and grounds where the mystery has taken place. By good fortune she comes across a maid sent to the house from Richmond, and so frightens her that she gains a chance to act in her place. She finds an extraordinary set of affairs at the house, and during the first night is nearly terrified out of her senses when, hiding in the chapel, she sees a ghostly figure come from the grand organ. The house is roused by her screams as she flees the room, and she is forbidden from going back there by the sister of the missing man. During the following night she is locked in her room during a thunderstorm, and while escaping through a window sees the ghostly figure again in the family graveyard. She enlists the aid of an old black man and, both badly scared, make an investigation which starts from a particular chord played at the grand organ. They find that certain keys cause a secret door in the organ to open, revealing a secret passage to a family tomb. There she discovers two expert crooks and solves a mystery that has baffled the detectives, laying bare the scheme to extort a young man accused of the crime whom she has become deeply interested.

== Cast ==
- Enid Bennett as Betsy Thorne
- Dorcas Matthews as Dolores Arnold
- Jack Nelson as Daniel Arnold
- Lloyd Hughes as Roland Dunwoody
- William Conklin as Dr. James Dunwoody
- Harry Archer as John Wells
- Otto Hoffman as Managing Editor
- Joe Anthony as Uncle Moseby Adams
