= The Woman in the Suitcase =

1920 film

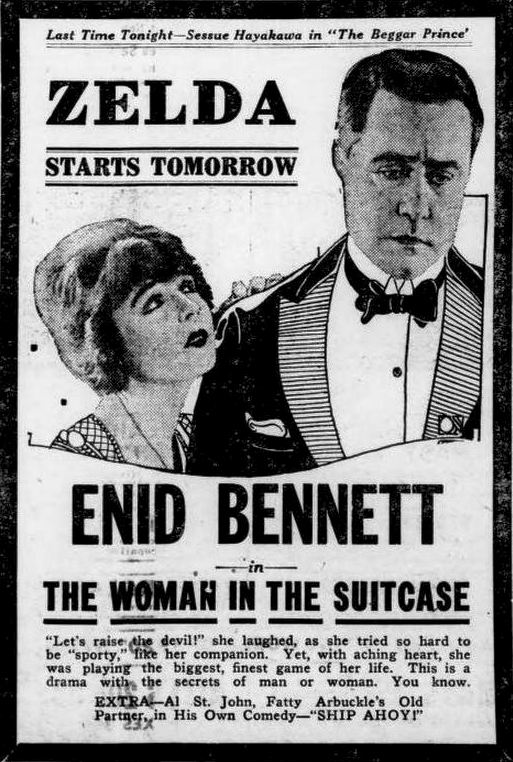
- Newspaper advertisement
- Directed by: Fred Niblo
- Written by: C. Gardner Sullivan
- Produced by: Thomas H. Ince
- Starring: Enid Bennett; William Conklin
- Cinematography: George Barnes
- Edited by: Harry L. Decker
- Distributed by: Paramount Pictures / Artcraft
- Release date: January 11, 1920
- Running time: 60 minutes
- Country: United States
- Language: Silent (English intertitles)

The Woman in the Suitcase is a 1920 American silent drama film directed by Fred Niblo, and is the first Paramount film released in the 1920s. A print of the film is held by the Library of Congress.

== Plot ==
The Woman in the Suitcase (1920)

Mary's father James Moreland returns from a business trip to Philadelphia and while searching his suitcase for a promised present, she finds the autographed picture of Dolly Wright. Mary does not inform her mother of this fact, but instead decides to save her father from this wicked woman. She advertises for an escort to take about town in a search of the Wright woman. Billy Friske, the son of the owner of the newspaper, answers the advertisement and they soon discover Moreland at a dance. Mary makes the acquaintance of the young woman and is soon invited to her apartment. There she meets her father, who sees the error of his ways and returns home with Mary. Mary is made happy by the faithful Billy and accepts him as her life partner.

== Cast ==
- Enid Bennett as Mary Moreland
- William Conklin as James B. Moreland
- Dorcas Matthews as Dolly Wright
- Rowland V. Lee as W.H. 'Billy' Fiske (as Roland Lee)
- Claire McDowell as Mrs. James B. Moreland
- Donald MacDonald as 'Doc' Harrison (as Donald McDonald)
- Gladys George as Ethel
