= What Every Woman Learns =

1919 film

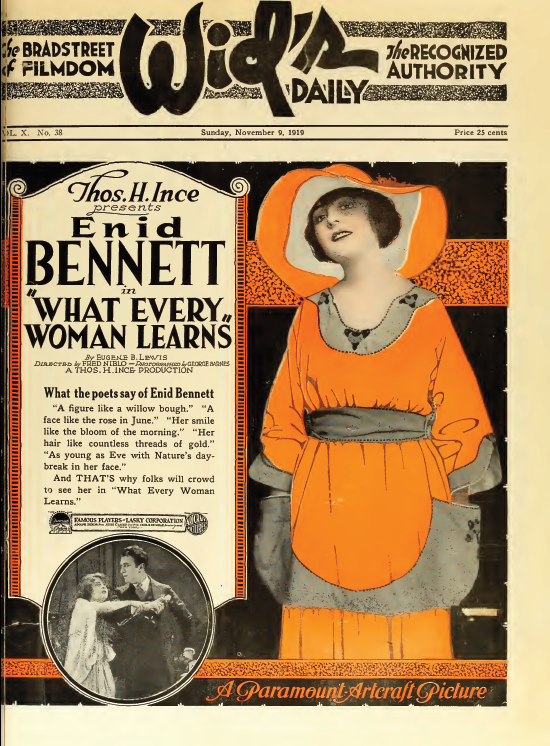
- Advert for film
- Directed by: Fred Niblo
- Written by: Eugene B. Lewis
- Produced by: Thomas H. Ince
- Starring: Enid Bennett; Milton Sills
- Cinematography: George Barnes
- Edited by: W. Duncan Mansfield
- Production company: Famous Players–Lasky/Artcraft
- Distributed by: Paramount Pictures
- Release date: November 9, 1919
- Running time: 50 minutes
- Country: United States
- Language: Silent with English intertitles
- Budget: $44,425
- Box office: $169,358 (through Oct. 1923)

What Every Woman Learns is a 1919 American silent drama film directed by Fred Niblo.

== Plot ==
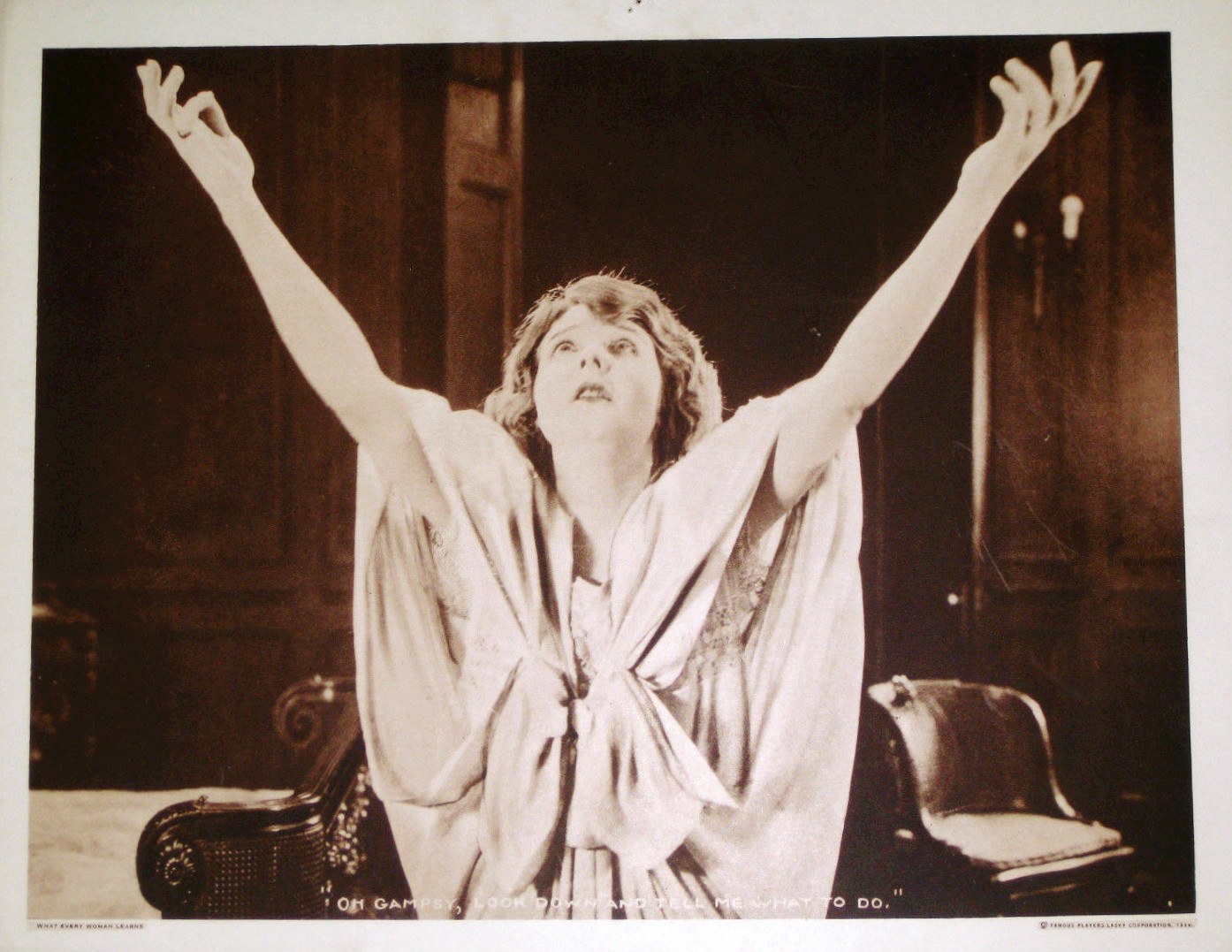
Lobby card

Amy is married to a cad but visits another man who loves her and helps her endure her marriage. After a confrontation and struggle between the men which leads to a death, Amy stands accused of the murder.

== Cast ==
- Enid Bennett as Amy Fortesque
- Milton Sills as Walter Melrose
- Irving Cummings as Dick Gaylord
- William Conklin as John Matson
- Lydia Knott as Aunt Charlotte
- Theodore Roberts as Peter Fortesque
