= Happy Though Married =

1919 film

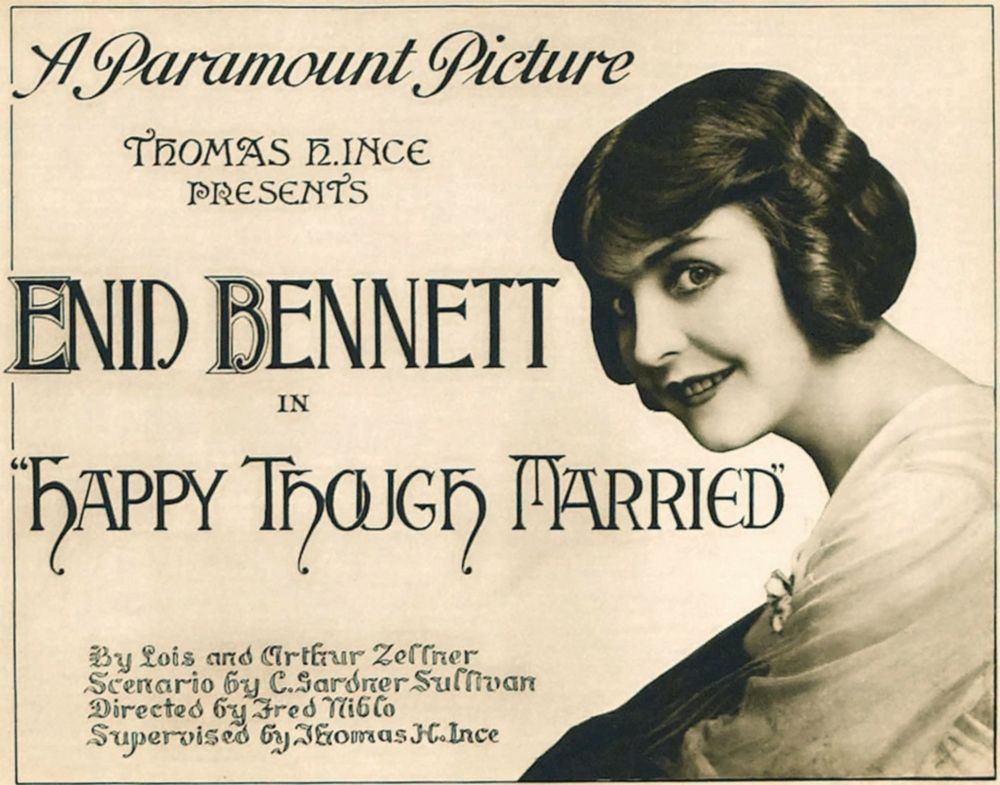
- Directed by: Fred Niblo
- Written by: C. Gardner Sullivan; Arthur J. Zellner; Lois Zellner
- Produced by: Thomas H. Ince
- Starring: Enid Bennett; Hallam Cooley
- Cinematography: Robert Newhard
- Edited by: W. Duncan Mansfield
- Release date: February 23, 1919
- Running time: 5 reels
- Country: United States
- Languages: Silent; English intertitles

Happy Though Married is a 1919 American silent comedy film directed by Fred Niblo.

== Plot ==
As described in a film magazine, Jim Montjoy, who is engaged to Millicent Lee, goes with his brother Jim to Mexico to make their fortunes. Jim falls in love with a Mexican girl, Diana Ramon, and a photograph of her gets into Jim's coat pocket. The brothers own a mining claim that Diana's uncle wants to buy, so Jim stays in Mexico to look after the property while Stanley goes to New York to try to obtain a better price. There he discovers Bob Davis is trying to cut him out, so he marries Millicent without delay. As a joke he buys his wife a book titled How to be Happy Though Married, but it ends up giving her jealous thoughts. She finds the photograph of Diana in Stanley's coat pocket and pretends to go away on a visit, but when she returns to the house she finds her husband escorting the original from the photograph and installing her in one of the bedrooms. Jim, having eloped with his Mexican charmer, is back in town and left to buy new clothes, and Jim then leaves without knowing his wife is in the house. The women meet, and although neither can understand the other's language, they get into an argument. Blond Millicent thinks the handsome brunette is trying to steal her husband, while Diana thinks that her sister-in-law is attempting to rob her of her jewels. All is resolved when the men return.

== Cast ==
- Enid Bennett as Millicent Lee
- Hallam Cooley as Jim Montjoy (as Hal Cooley)
- Charles K. French as Diana's uncle (as Charles French)
- Nora Johnson as Bob's wife (as Norine Johnston)
- Douglas MacLean as Stanley Montjoy
- Philo McCullough as Bob Davis
- Lydia Yeamans Titus as Aunt Mattie
- Vola Vale as Diana Ramon
