= The Kiss (1921 film) =

1921 film

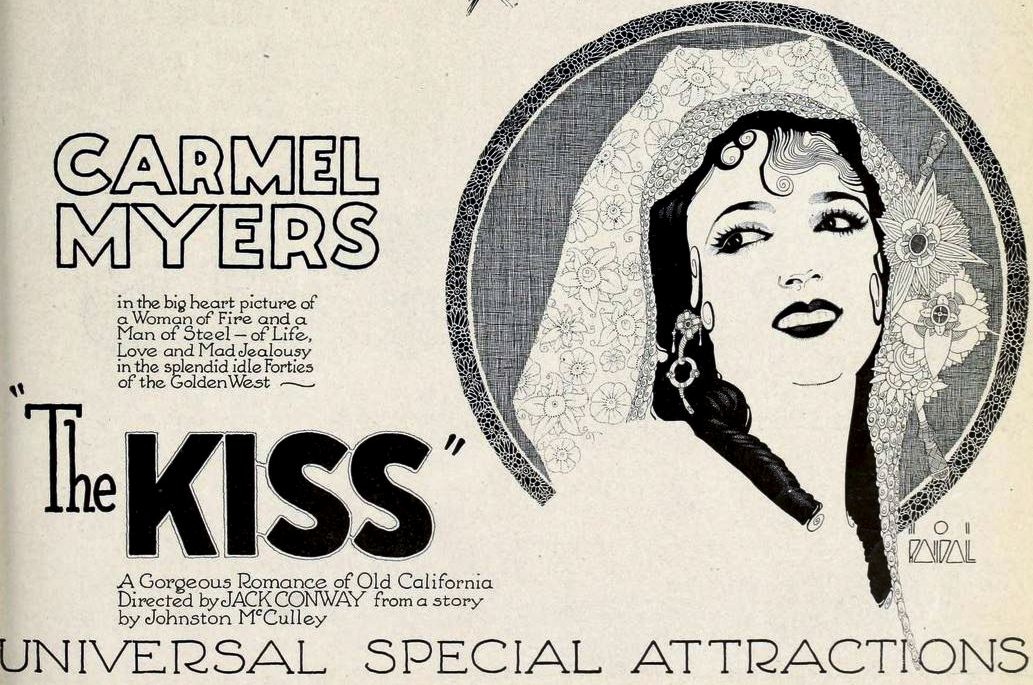
- Directed by: Jack Conway
- Written by: Andrew Percival Younger
- Based on: Little Erolinda; 1916 story in Adventure (magazine) by Johnston McCulley
- Produced by: Carl Laemmle
- Starring: Carmel Myers; George Periolat; J.P. Lockney
- Cinematography: Bert Glennon
- Production company: Universal Pictures
- Distributed by: Universal Pictures
- Release date: July 4, 1921
- Running time: 5 reels 50 minutes
- Country: United States
- Languages: Silent; English intertitles

The Kiss is a 1921 American silent drama film directed by Jack Conway and starring Carmel Myers, George Periolat and J.P. Lockney

== Cast ==
- George Periolat as Don Luis Baldarama
- W.E. Lawrence as Andre Baldarama
- J.P. Lockney as Selistino Vargas
- Carmel Myers as Erolinda Vargas
- J. Jiquel Lanoe as Carlos
- Harvey Clark as Miguel Chavez
- Jean Acker as Isabella Chavez
- Ed Brady as Manuel Feliz

== Bibliography ==
- James Robert Parish & Michael R. Pitts. Film directors: a guide to their American films. Scarecrow Press, 1974.
