= Stepping Out (1919 film) =

1919 film

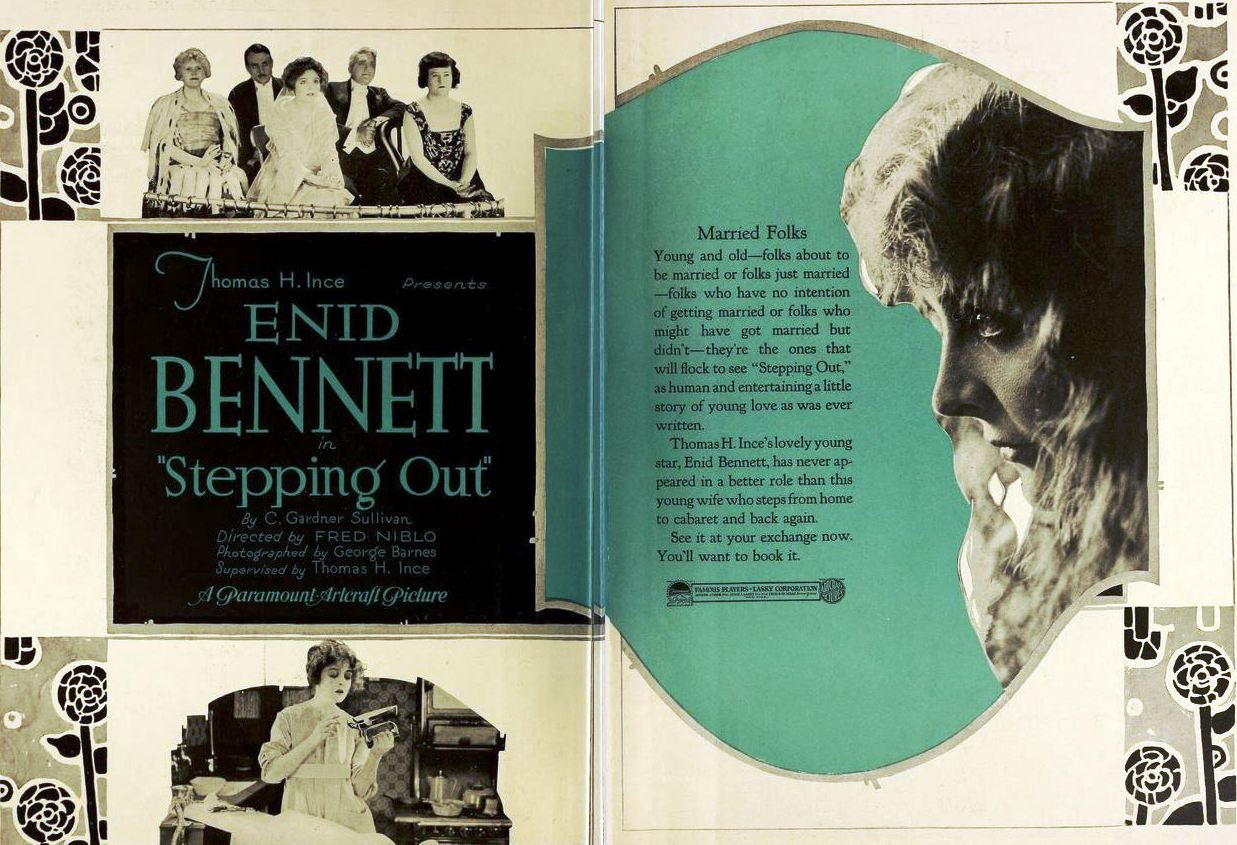
- Ad for film
- Directed by: Fred Niblo
- Written by: C. Gardner Sullivan
- Produced by: Thomas H. Ince
- Starring: Enid Bennett; Niles Welch
- Cinematography: George Barnes
- Edited by: Ralph Dixon
- Distributed by: Paramount Pictures
- Release date: September 21, 1919
- Running time: 50 minutes
- Country: United States
- Language: Silent with English intertitles

Stepping Out is a 1919 American silent drama film directed by Fred Niblo. It is not known whether the film currently survives, suggesting that it may be a lost film.

== Cast ==
- Enid Bennett as The Wife
- Niles Welch as The Husband
- Julia Faye as The Secretary
- Gertrude Claire as The Husband's Mother
- William Conklin as Frank Wilson (as William S. Conklin)
- Bota Miller as Robert Hillary Jr.
