= Misty Mountain =

House in Beverly Glen, Los Angeles, California, US

Coordinates: 34°05′42″N 118°26′13″W

Misty Mountain at 1330 Angelo Drive (also known as the Stein House or Frederick Niblo House) is a large detached house in the Bel Air neighborhood of Los Angeles, sited on 6.5 acres of grounds with landscaped gardens and a swimming pool and tennis court. It was designed by Wallace Neff and built in 1926 for the film director Fred Niblo and his wife, the actress Enid Bennett. The house has been assessed for taxation purposes at 8,651 square feet with 11 bedrooms and nine bathrooms. It has been described as "crab shaped", with the design of the house curling around a motor court at its center.

Neff's original floor plan for the house was described by Variety magazine as featuring an "elliptical entrance hall flanked by formal living and dining rooms, a library and a private guest bedroom with en suite bathroom and private entrance". A service wing contained "a kitchen-sized butler's pantry, a slightly larger kitchen with walk-in pantry, an adjoining breakfast room and a pair of staff bedrooms that share a hall bathroom". Staff or guest quarters had a living room with kitchen, a bathroom and two bedrooms. Neff calculated the turning circle of Niblo's car when designing the driveway. Following a decline in Niblo's fortunes with the advent of sound in motion pictures, Niblo rented the house to Katharine Hepburn.

The house was later owned by Jules Stein, the founder of the MCA Inc. talent agency and media company. Stein bought the house in 1940 after a bidding war against Cary Grant. Stein died in 1981; the house was listed for sale for $10 million. It was bought by the Australian-born American media proprietor Rupert Murdoch in September 1986 for $5.8 million, with Murdoch's purchase papers signed by Barry Diller. In his 2001 book Virtual Murdoch, Neil Chenoweth attributes the commanding position of the house as having contributed to Murdoch's success in deals and negotiations. The estate was quietly put up for sale in 2014 for a price believed to be $35 million. The house was bought by Murdoch's youngest son, James.

The Stein house inspired Ken Ungar's design for his own house on Country Valley Road in Westlake Village.

Jean Stein recounted her childhood in the house and her parents' parties there in her 2016 memoir West of Eden. Stein recalled her mother telling her that Orson Welles had visited the house with Dolores del Río and told her that it reminded him of the German resort of Berchtesgaden, the mountain retreat of Adolf Hitler. Stein was also told that Katharine Hepburn encountered snakes in the living room of the house when she lived there in the 1930s. In Stein's memoir Fiona Shaw recalled that when at the house "Up there you couldn't believe you were in Los Angeles...But of course as soon as you came out on the patio behind the house and looked down at the city, you thought you were in heaven, looking down on earth". At parties, films were shown by Stein's parents in an underground screening room at the house.
