= Silk Hosiery =

1920 film by Fred Niblo

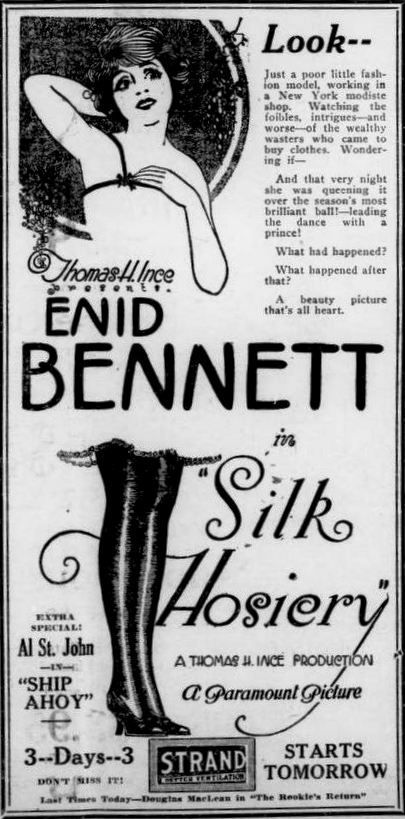
- Newspaper ad
- Directed by: Fred Niblo
- Written by: Frank Mitchell Dazey
- Produced by: Thomas H. Ince
- Starring: Enid Bennett; Geoffrey Webb
- Cinematography: George Barnes
- Edited by: Charles H. Kyson; Harry Marker
- Distributed by: Paramount Pictures
- Release date: December 26, 1920
- Running time: 5 reels (1,388.65 meters)
- Country: United States
- Language: Silent (English intertitles)

Silk Hosiery is a 1920 American silent comedy film directed by Fred Niblo and starring Enid Bennett. A print listed as being in nitrate exists in the Library of Congress and another in the UCLA Film & Television Archive.

== Plot ==
As summarized in a film publication, Marjorie Bowen is a model who longs for romance and adventure of the story book variety, but never gets further than displaying gowns at an ultra-fashionable clothing shop. Every customer who comes in is buying a gown for a ball thrown by some Prince. Yvette, a French woman, comes to order a gown and brings her fiancé Sir Leeds, who immediately attracts Marjorie's attention, but she loses hope after she hears that he is engaged. Marjorie stays alone in the shop to deliver the gown to Yvette and dresses herself in the costume. Some crook business follows in which Yvette and an idler are implicated. Marjorie gets mixed up in it and ends up kidnapped and in a room with Sir Leeds, who tries to explain what happened. They escape and Marjorie impresses the Prince by recovering a note and piece of jewelry that the Prince had indiscreetly given a New York society woman and which he feared would be used against him. Leeds turns out to be a detective. He asks Marjorie to marry him.

== Cast ==
- Enid Bennett as Marjorie Bowen
- Geoffrey Webb as Sir Derwain Leeds
- Marie Pavis as Yvette Fernau
- Donald MacDonald as Cadwallader Smith
- Derek Ghent as Prince Ferdinandi (credited as Derrick Ghent)
- Otto Hoffman as Van Twiller
- Joan Standing as Sophia Black
- Verne Winter as Billy Black (credited as Vern Winters)
- Harold Holland as Jim Shanahan
- Bonnie Hill as Mollie Milligan
- Sylvia Brooks as Mrs. De Windt
- Rose Dione as Madame Louise
