= William Conklin =

American actor (1872–1935)

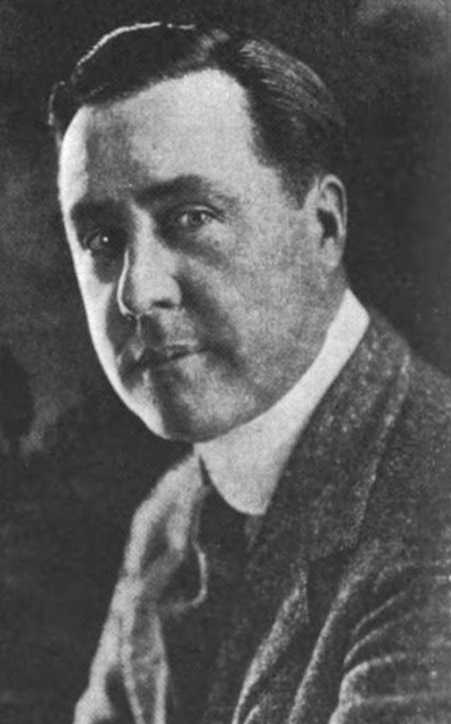
- Born: December 25, 1872; Brooklyn, New York, U.S.
- Died: March 21, 1935 (aged 62); Hollywood, California, U.S.
- Occupation: Actor
- Years active: 1913–1929

William Conklin (December 25, 1872 – March 21, 1935) was an American actor. He appeared in more than 80 silent films between 1913 and 1929. He was born in Brooklyn, New York, and died in Hollywood, California.

== Partial filmography ==
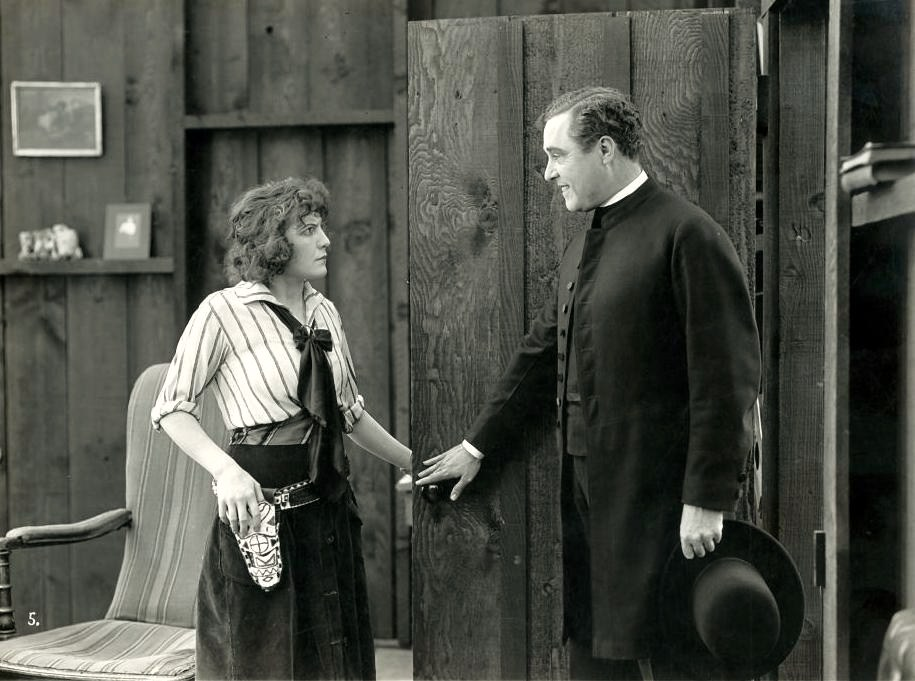
Film still of Louise Glaum and Conklin in Golden Rule Kate (1917)

- Arizona (1913)
- Neal of the Navy (1915), a serial
- The Sultana (1916)
- The Yellow Pawn (1916)
- Joan the Woman (1916)
- Spellbound (1916) as Harrington Graeme
- The Devil's Bait (1917)
- Out of the Wreck (1917)
- The Prison Without Walls (1917)
- The Serpent's Tooth (1917)
- The Law of the Land (1917)
- Golden Rule Kate (1917)
- The Price Mark (1917)
- Sold at Auction (1917)
- Love Letters (1917)
- Flare-Up Sal (1918)
- Love Me (1918)
- Tyrant Fear (1918)
- The Mating of Marcella (1918)
- The Turn of a Card (1918)
- Come Again Smith (1919)
- The Haunted Bedroom (1919)
- Hay Foot, Straw Foot (1919)
- The Virtuous Thief (1919)
- Stepping Out (1919)
- What Every Woman Learns (1919)
- Red Hot Dollars (1919)
- When Fate Decides (1919)
- The Drifters (1919)
- The Woman in the Suitcase (1920)
- Sex (1920)
- Love Madness (1920)
- When Dawn Came (1920)
- The Brute Master (1920)
- Hairpins (1920)
- Beau Revel (1921)
- Blind Hearts (1921)
- The Lure of Youth (1921)
- The Other Woman (1921)
- Iron to Gold (1922)
- Up and Going (1922)
- When Husbands Deceive (1922)
- The Woman He Married (1922)
- Three Who Paid (1923)
- The Lonely Road (1923)
- The Lone Star Ranger (1923)
- The Goldfish (1924)
- Never Say Die (1924)
- Ports of Call (1925)
- The Rag Man (1925)
- Head Winds (1925)
- Fifth Avenue Models (1925)
- A Gentleman Roughneck (1925)
- Counsel for the Defense (1925)
- Old Ironsides (1926)
- Sweet Rosie O'Grady (1926)
- Outlaws of Red River (1927)
- Tumbling River (1927)
- Rose of the Golden West (1927)
- That's My Daddy (1928)
- Life's Crossroads (1928)
- The Divine Lady (1929)
- Shanghai Rose (1929)
