= The False Road =

1920 film by Fred Niblo

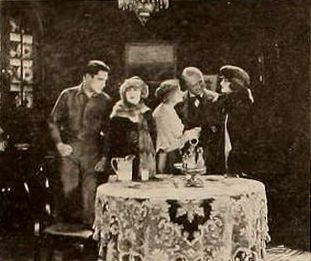
- Film still
- Directed by: Fred Niblo
- Written by: C. Gardner Sullivan
- Produced by: Thomas H. Ince
- Starring: Enid Bennett; Lloyd Hughes
- Cinematography: George Barnes
- Distributed by: Paramount Pictures
- Release date: April 18, 1920
- Running time: 64 minutes
- Country: United States
- Language: Silent (English intertitles)

The False Road is a 1920 American silent drama film directed by Fred Niblo. A copy of the film is preserved at the Library of Congress.

== Plot ==
As described in a film publication, Betty Palmer is in a New York criminal gang. Her sweetheart, Roger Moran, completes a two-year sentence at Sing Sing and surprises her when he announces at a banquet the gang gives in honor of his return that he is going straight. She refuses to leave her pals in the gang, so he leaves her and finally obtains work at a local bank in a small New England town. Later, the gang leader sends Betty and a confederate to rob the bank. Roger follows them back to New York and, by posing as a backslider, succeeds through Betty in recovering the stolen cash. Betty then abandons the life of crime and marries the man of her heart.

== Cast ==
- Enid Bennett as Betty Palmer
- Lloyd Hughes as 'Pickpocket' Roger Moran
- Wade Boteler as 'Sapphire' Mike Wilson
- Lucille Young as 'Frisco' Minnie
- Charles Smiley as Joshua Starbuck
- Edith Yorke as Mother Starbuck
- Gordon Mullen as Crook Chauffeur
