= Partners Three =

1919 film

- Directed by: Fred Niblo
- Written by: J. G. Hawks
- Produced by: Thomas H. Ince
- Starring: Enid Bennett; Casson Ferguson
- Cinematography: George Barnes
- Edited by: W. Duncan Mansfield
- Distributed by: Paramount Pictures
- Release date: March 23, 1919
- Running time: 50 minutes
- Country: United States
- Languages: Silent; English intertitles

Partners Three is a 1919 American silent Western film directed by Fred Niblo. A nitrate and/or acetate copy exists at the Library of Congress. Prints held at the Library of Congress and UCLA Film & Television Archive.

== Cast ==
- Enid Bennett as Agnes Cuyler
- Casson Ferguson as Arthur Gould
- J. P. Lockney as Hassayampa Hardy (as John P. Lockney)
- Robert McKim as Grant Haywood
- Lydia Yeamans Titus as Gossip
