= Her Husband's Friend =

1920 film

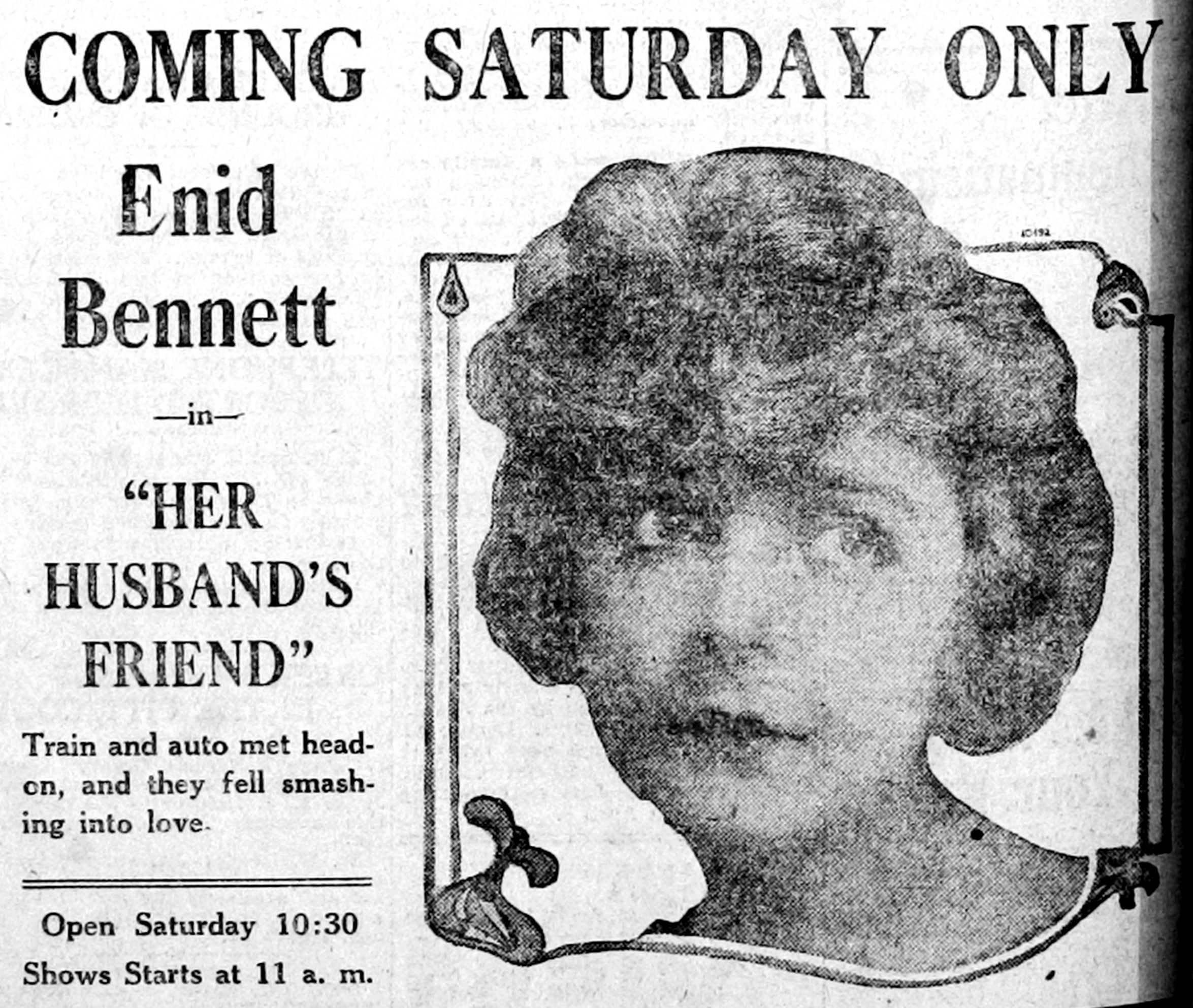
- Newspaper advertisement
- Directed by: Fred Niblo
- Written by: Marjorie Benton Cooke; Agnes Christine Johnston; Carol Kapleau
- Produced by: Thomas H. Ince
- Starring: Enid Bennett; Rowland V. Lee
- Cinematography: George Barnes
- Edited by: Harry Marker
- Distributed by: Paramount Pictures
- Release date: November 14, 1920
- Running time: 5 reels
- Country: United States
- Language: Silent (English intertitles)

Her Husband's Friend is a 1920 American silent drama film directed by Fred Niblo starring Enid Bennett. A copy of the film is preserved at the Library of Congress.

== Plot ==
Princeton Hadley, because of favors done during his college days by Billy Westover, feels a moral obligation upon Billy's sudden death in an automobile accident to hold to the responsibility of paying the widow's alimony to Judith as her husband's bondsman, even though the law does not require this. Shortly before his death, Billy had been divorced from his wife and had lost his fortune. Later, Princeton meets the widow without knowing her identity and falls in love with her. Judith is revealed when the two are brought before their lawyer, and Princeton convinces her that he wishes to continue his obligation as her husband.

== Cast ==
- Enid Bennett as Judith Westover
- Rowland V. Lee as Billy Westover (credited as Roland Lee)
- Tom Chatterton as Princeton Hadley
- Mae Busch as Clarice
- Aileen Manning as Dr. Henrietta Carter
- George C. Pearce as Dr. Ogilvy (credited as George Pierce)
- Robert Dunbar as John Morton
