= Fuss and Feathers =

1918 film

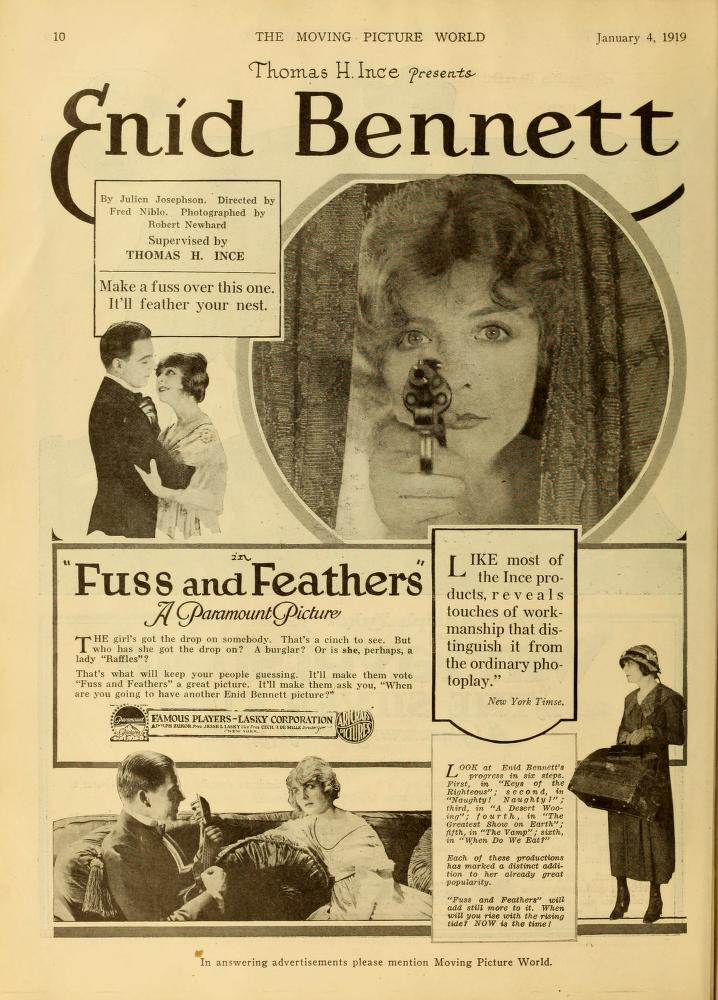
- ad for film
- Directed by: Fred Niblo
- Written by: Julien Josephson
- Produced by: Thomas H. Ince
- Starring: Enid Bennett; Douglas MacLean
- Cinematography: Robert Newhard
- Edited by: W. Duncan Mansfield
- Production company: Thomas H. Ince Corporation
- Distributed by: Paramount Pictures
- Release date: December 8, 1918
- Running time: 50 minutes
- Country: United States
- Language: Silent (English intertitles)

Fuss and Feathers is a 1918 American silent comedy film directed by Fred Niblo. It is not known whether the film currently survives, which suggests that it is a lost film.

== Plot ==
A young girl suddenly finds herself wealthy, but lacking in social graces. She calls upon the disinherited son from a wealthy family for help.

== Cast ==
- Enid Bennett as Susie Baldwin
- Douglas MacLean as Robert Leedyard
- J. P. Lockney as Pete Baldwin (as John P. Lockney)
- Charles K. French as Martin Ledyard
- Sylvia Ashton as Mrs. Ledyard
- Robert McKim as J. Wells Stanton
- Lucille Young as "High Bow" Flow (as Lucile Young)
