= A Woman's Heart (film) =

1926 film directed by Phil Rosen

- Directed by: Phil Rosen
- Written by: Lucille De Nevers
- Based on: The Revelations of a Woman's Heart by Ruth D'Agostino
- Produced by: Joe Rock
- Starring: Enid Bennett; Gayne Whitman; Edward Earle
- Cinematography: H. Lyman Broening
- Production company: Sterling Pictures
- Release date: September 15, 1926 (US)
- Running time: 6 reels
- Country: United States
- Language: Silent (English intertitles)

A Woman's Heart is a 1926 American silent melodrama film directed by Phil Rosen and starring Enid Bennett, Gayne Whitman, and Edward Earle. Based upon a novel by Ruth D'Agostino, it was released on September 15, 1926.

== Plot ==
As described in a film magazine review, immediately after returning home from her honeymoon with John Waring, Eve finds that she still loves her old sweetheart Ralph Deane. Unknowingly, Eve actually made the right choice as the old sweetheart has been "true" to several women. To prevent a divorce, Eve's younger sister Patsy conceives a means of trapping Ralph and exposing him to her sister. In carrying out this scheme, Patsy comes close to involving herself as well as Eve and her husband in the murder of Ralph. Then, one of Ralph's jilted lady friends commits suicide and leaves evidence that clears up the mystery of Ralph's death. Eve learns a lesson and finds that she does love her husband.

== Cast ==
- Enid Bennett as Eve Waring
- Gayne Whitman as John Waring
- Edward Earle as Ralph Deane
- Mabel Julienne Scott as Vixen
- Lois Boyd as Patsy Allen
- Louis Payne as Lawyer

== Preservation ==
With no prints of A Woman's Heart located in any film archives, it is a lost film.
