= The Virtuous Thief =

1919 film

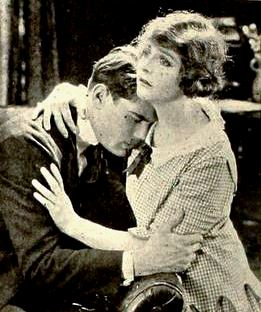
- film still with Lloyd Hughes and Enid Bennett
- Directed by: Fred Niblo
- Written by: C. Gardner Sullivan
- Produced by: Thomas H. Ince
- Starring: Enid Bennett; Niles Welch
- Cinematography: George Barnes
- Edited by: W. Duncan Mansfield
- Production company: Thomas H. Ince Corporation
- Distributed by: Paramount Pictures
- Release date: August 10, 1919
- Running time: 50 minutes
- Country: United States
- Language: Silent (English intertitles)

The Virtuous Thief is a lost 1919 American silent drama film directed by Fred Niblo.

== Plot ==
As described in a film magazine, Dick Armitage, essentially honest but weak, steals a small sum from his employer, Walter Haskell, but confesses the theft prior to its discovery in hopes of leniency. Haskell asks him to sign a confession and gives him three days to raise the money, meanwhile discharging him. Dick is unable to raise the sum so his sister Shirley enters Haskell's employ as a stenographer to pay back the debt. Haskell becomes enamored of her and allows her marked attentions, to the dismay of Bobby Baker, also in Haskell's employ and Shirley's sweetheart. Matters reach a climax when Haskell attempts certain familiarities and is rebuffed. He then threatens the arrest of Dick unless Shirley bends to his will. She returns to the office at night to steal Dick's confession and is caught by Haskell. Mrs. Haskell has detectives watching her husband and they bring her to the scene. A woman who had lived upon Haskell's bounty also appears. The next morning Haskell is found dead in his office. Dick believes his sister is guilty and unsuccessfully attempts to take the blame. Mrs. Haskell arrives at the police headquarters and vindicates Shirley. The police later locate the murderess with happiness then following Dick, Shirley, and Bobbie.

== Cast ==
- Enid Bennett as Shirley Armitage
- Niles Welch as Bobbie Baker
- Lloyd Hughes as Dick Armitage
- Willis Marks as Major Jefferson Armitage
- William Conklin as Walter Haskell
- Dorcas Matthews as Mrs. Haskell
- Lucille Young as Amie Renault
- Andrew Robson as Police Captain
