= When Do We Eat? (1918 film) =

1918 film

- Lobby card
- Directed by: Fred Niblo
- Written by: C. Gardner Sullivan
- Produced by: Thomas H. Ince
- Starring: Enid Bennett; Albert Ray
- Cinematography: Robert Newhard
- Edited by: W. Duncan Mansfield
- Distributed by: Famous Players–Lasky
- Release date: October 7, 1918
- Running time: 50 minutes
- Country: United States
- Language: Silent with English intertitles

When Do We Eat? is a 1918 American silent comedy film directed by Fred Niblo.

== Plot ==
Nora, an actress, is performing in an adaptation of Uncle Tom's Cabin in a Texas town. A sheriff enters with an attachment against the show. Nora, dressed as Little Eva, escapes from the venue and gets onto a train. A tramp makes advances towards her, causing her to jump from the train. She lands in a field and is arrested for looking suspicious.

She is saved from jail by Ma Forbes, who is after someone to help her with some residents at her boarding house. The boarders "Soup" McCool and "Pug" Hennessy are actually criminals. They con Ma's son, James out of $300. They then plan a bank robbery with the help of Nora. They think she is a safecracker, who they've been expecting. Nora plays along, and opens the safe, as she was given the combination from James. Once the safe has been cracked, Nora raises the alarm and the crooks are caught. Afterwards, James proposes to Nora.

== Cast ==
- Enid Bennett as Nora
- Albert Ray as James Waterson Forbes (as Al Ray)
- Gertrude Claire as Undetermined Role
- Jack Nelson as 'Soup' McCool
- Robert McKim as 'Pug' Hennessy
- Frank Hayes as Martin Grubb
- Caroline Rankin, Undetermined Role

== Critical reception ==
Variety gave the film a positive review, commenting approvingly on the direction and photography. The review praised the cast, down to the extras, and singled out Enid Bennett for her "very good work as the little barnstormer". Variety called the film, "a pleasing and original picture," and concluded, "Such pictures are not seen often enough."

== Contemporary reviews ==
- "Enid Bennett in Hungry Role: Actress in 'When Do We Eat?' at Princess Theater". The Hartford Courant, October 11, 1918.
- When Do We Eat? (film review). Exhibitor's Trade Review, November 2, 1918, p. 1815.
- When Do We Eat? (film review). The Motion Picture News, November 9, 1918, p. 2892.
- When Do We Eat? (film review). The Moving Picture World, November 2, 1918, p. 621-622.
- When Do We Eat? (film review). The Moving Picture World, November 9, 1918, p. 694.
- When Do We Eat? (film review). Variety, October 25, 1918, p. 35.
- "'When Do We Eat?' Stars Enid Bennett". Atlanta Constitution, October 26, 1918.
