= The Law of Men (1919 film) =

1919 film

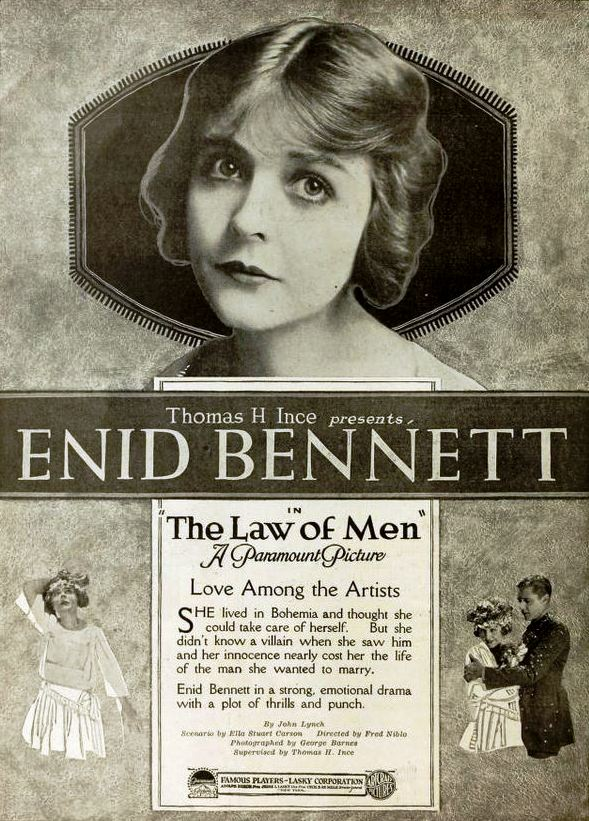
- Promotion of film in Moving Picture World, May 1919
- Directed by: Fred Niblo
- Written by: Ella Stuart Carson; John Lynch
- Produced by: Thomas H. Ince
- Starring: Enid Bennett; Niles Welch
- Cinematography: George Barnes
- Edited by: W. Duncan Mansfield
- Distributed by: Paramount/Artcraft
- Release date: April 27, 1919
- Running time: 50 minutes
- Country: United States
- Language: Silent (English intertitles)

The Law of Men is a lost 1919 American silent drama film directed by Fred Niblo.

== Plot ==
As described in the film magazine Moving Picture World, Laura Dayne, an ambitious young sculptor courted by neighboring young artist Denis Connors, has limited contact with the social world and knows little of the "law of men" and so unsuspicious when decadent architect Jamison Keene lures her to the Tarrytown Inn one night with a promise to consummate her dream of having her work in a municipal building. Keene had recently had the artist paint a miniature of Mildred Wade, the foolish wife of Laura's dear friend Benton Wade.

Laura goes to the Tarrytown Inn and into the trap set for her. Keene uses all of his disarming wiles in vain as Laura puts up such a struggle that the Inn management forces Keene to release her. Overwhelmed by the sense of her own folly, she goes to the artist and tells her story. In fury Denis goes to the Inn, but is ejected by the house detectives for using threatening language. He returns to his room and suggests marriage as the only way to protect Laura. She accepts, and just after the ceremony, Denis is arrested for the murder of Keene. At the trial Benton Wade, motivated also by his hatred of the spoiler of his own home, makes an impassioned defense of the innocent young man, but fails. Benton then becomes a victim of fear as Laura traces step by step his guilt for the crime and confronts him with the evidence. At the sentencing hearing, Benton confesses his guilt and then drinks poison, leaving the young artist and his devoted wife whose intelligence saved him.

== Cast ==
- Enid Bennett as Laura Dayne
- Niles Welch as Denis Connors
- Andrew Robson as Benton Wade
- Dorcas Matthews as Mildred Wade (as Dorcas Mathews)
- Donald MacDonald as Jamison Keene
- Frankie Lee as Child
