= Fred Niblo =

American film director (1874–1948)

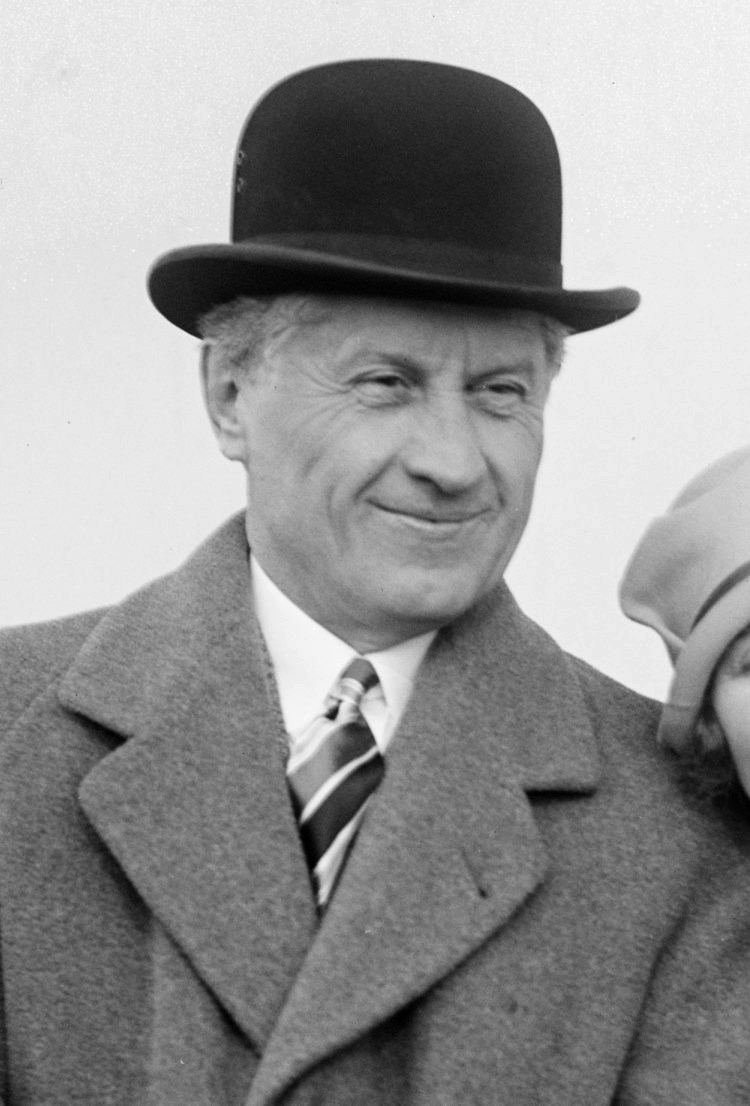
- Niblo in 1926
- Born: Frederick Liedtke; January 6, 1874; York, Nebraska, United States
- Died: November 11, 1948 (aged 74); New Orleans, Louisiana, United States
- Burial place: Forest Lawn Memorial Park Cemetery, Glendale, California, United States
- Occupations: Film director, actor
- Years active: 1916–1932
- Spouses: Josephine Cohan (m. 1901; died 1916) Enid Bennett (m. 1918)
- Children: 4, including Fred Niblo Jr.
- Family: George M. Cohan (brother-in-law)

Fred Niblo (born Frederick Liedtke; January 6, 1874 – November 11, 1948) was an American pioneer film actor, director and producer.

== Biography ==
He was born Frederick Liedtke (several sources give "Frederico Nobile", apparently erroneously) in York, Nebraska to a French mother and a father who had served as a captain in the American Civil War and was wounded at the Battle of Gettysburg. Using the stage name Fred Niblo, Liedtke began his show business career performing in vaudeville and in live theater. After more than 20 years doing live performing as a monologist, during which he traveled extensively around the globe, he worked in Australia from 1912 through 1915, where he turned to the burgeoning motion picture industry and made his first two films.

On June 2, 1901, Niblo married Broadway actress Josephine Cohan, the older sister of George M. Cohan. He managed the Four Cohans in their two big successes: The Governor's Son and Running for Office. From 1904 to 1905, Fred resumed his stage career, appearing as Walter Lee Leonard in The Rogers Brothers in Paris and then returned to vaudeville.

Josephine died in 1916, the year he began acting and directing motion pictures. While in Australia, he met actress Enid Bennett, whom he later married. As a Hollywood director, he is most remembered for several notable films, beginning with his 1920 work The Mark of Zorro which starred Douglas Fairbanks. The following year he teamed with Fairbanks in The Three Musketeers and then directed Rudolph Valentino in Blood and Sand.

In 1924, Niblo directed the film Thy Name Is Woman.

In 1925, Niblo was the principal director of the epic Ben-Hur, one of the more expensive films of the day but became the third highest-grossing silent film in cinema history. Niblo followed this success with two major 1926 works: The Temptress starring Greta Garbo in her second film in America and Norma Talmadge in Camille. Niblo directed some of the great stars of the era, including Joan Crawford, Lillian Gish, and Ronald Colman. In 1930, he directed his first sound film with two of the bigger names in show business: John Gilbert and Renée Adorée in a film titled Redemption.

Niblo and Bennett commissioned architect Wallace Neff to design their house on Angelo Drive, which they named Misty Mountain. It was completed in 1926 and sold by Niblo to Jules C. Stein in 1940 after a decline in his fortunes.

Actress Marion Shilling, who worked with Niblo on Young Donovan's Kid, said, "One of the reasons for his success as a director, certainly, was that he had been an actor himself. He could empathize, see and feel a scene from an actor's viewpoint. He never talked down to us. He was a lovely human being."

Niblo retired in 1933 after more than 40 years in show business. The last 16 years were used to make more than 40 films, most of which were feature-length projects. He was an important personality in the early years of Hollywood and was one of the original founders of the Academy of Motion Picture Arts and Sciences. In recognition of his role in the development of the film industry, he received a star on the Hollywood Walk of Fame at 7014 Hollywood Boulevard on February 8, 1960. His Ben-Hur film has been selected for preservation in the United States National Film Registry.

Niblo died in New Orleans, Louisiana, and is interred in Forest Lawn Memorial Park Cemetery near his wife, Enid Bennett, with whom he had three children, in Glendale, California. His son with Josephine Cohan, Fred Niblo, Jr. (1903–1973), was an Academy Award-nominated screenwriter.

== Filmography ==
Film posters

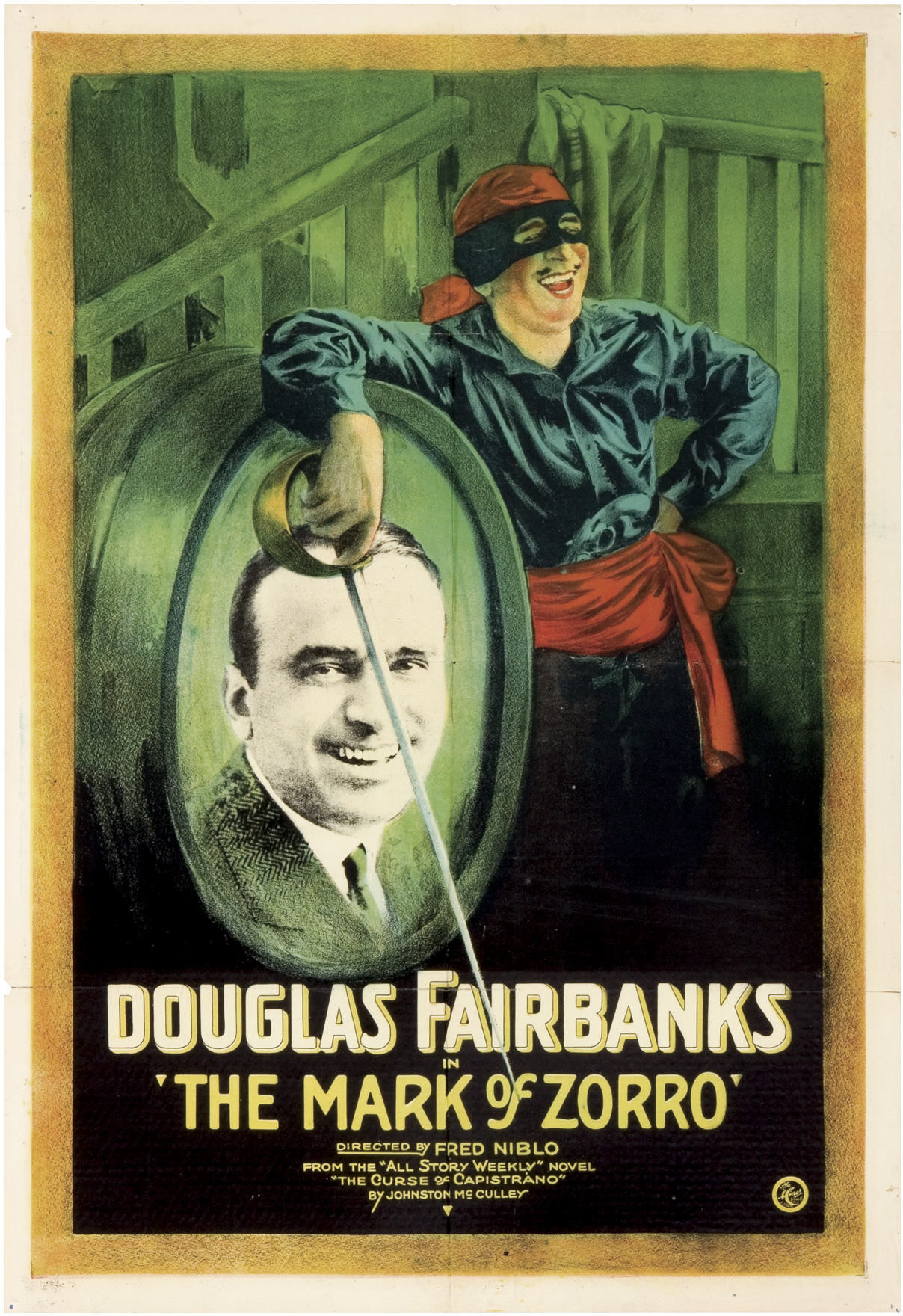
The Mark of Zorro (1920)

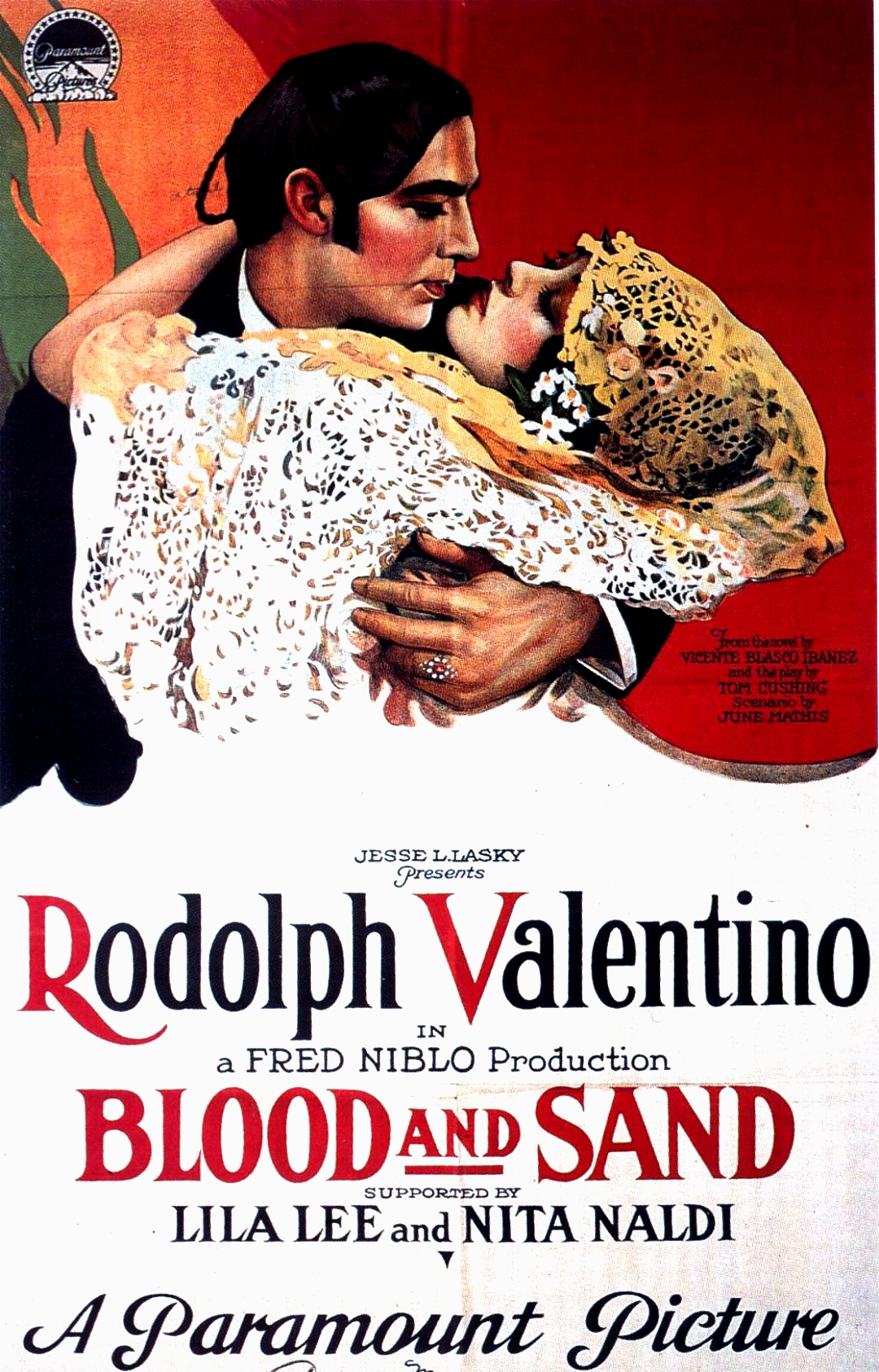
Blood and Sand (1922)

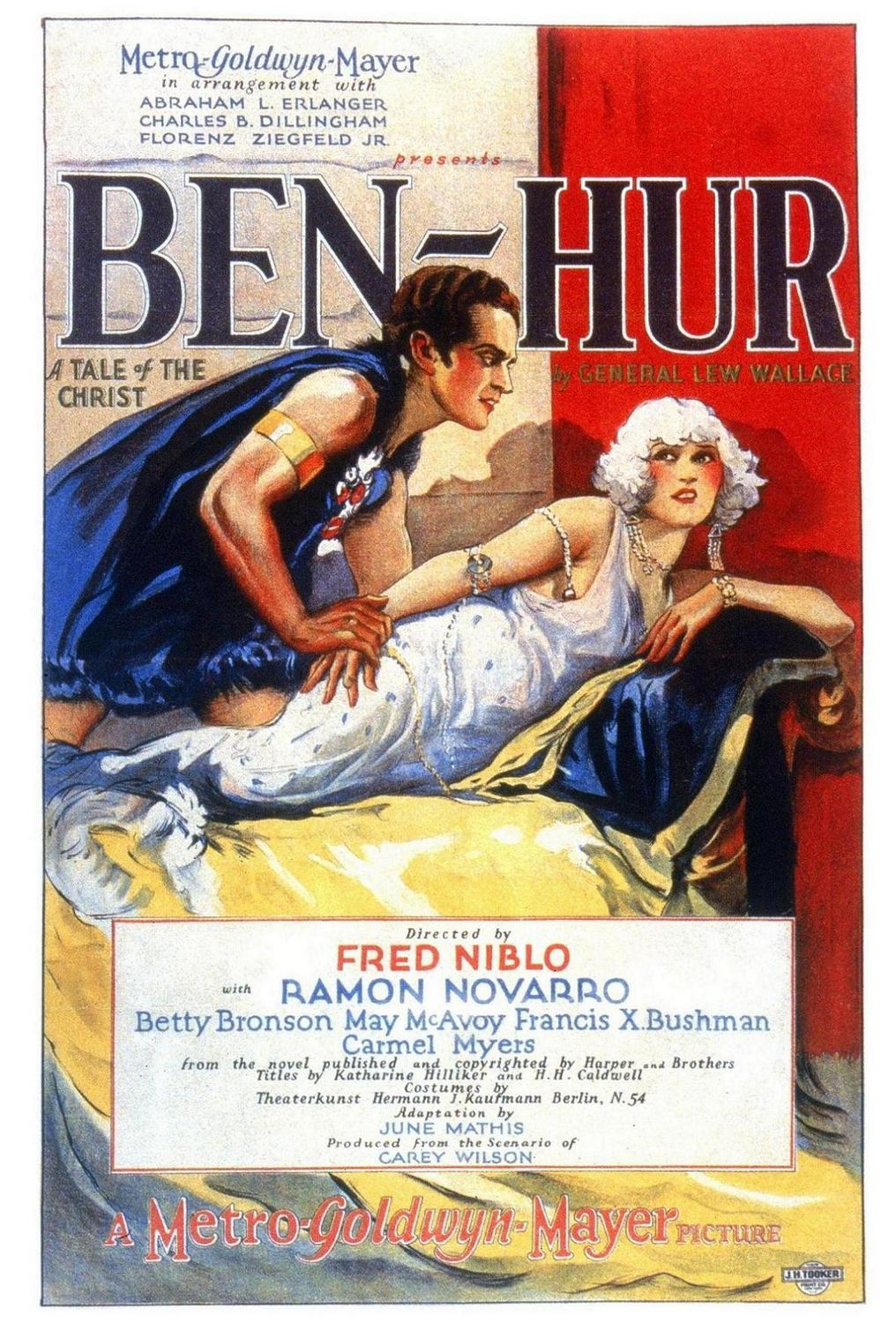
Ben-Hur (1925)

Year	Title	Role
1916	Get-Rich-Quick Wallingford	J. Rufus Wallingford
1916	Officer 666	Travers Gladwin
1918	The Marriage Ring	
1918	When Do We Eat?	
1918	Fuss and Feathers	
1919	Happy Though Married	
1919	Partners Three	
1919	The Law of Men	
1919	The Haunted Bedroom	
1919	The Virtuous Thief	
1919	Stepping Out	
1919	What Every Woman Learns	
1919	Dangerous Hours	
1920	The Woman in the Suitcase	
1920	Sex	
1920	The False Road	
1920	Hairpins	
1920	Her Husband's Friend	
1920	The Mark of Zorro	
1920	Silk Hosiery	
1921	Mother o' Mine	
1921	Greater Than Love	
1921	The Three Musketeers	
1922	The Woman He Married	
1922	Rose o' the Sea	
1922	Blood and Sand	
1923	The Famous Mrs. Fair	
1923	Strangers of the Night	
1924	Thy Name Is Woman	
1924	The Red Lily	
1925	Ben-Hur: A Tale of the Christ	
1926	The Temptress	
1927	Camille	
1927	The Devil Dancer	
1927	The Enemy	
1928	Two Lovers	
1928	The Mysterious Lady	
1928	Dream of Love	
1930	Redemption	
1930	Way Out West	
1931	Young Donovan's Kid	
1931	The Big Gamble	
1932	Two White Arms aka Wives Beware	
1932	Diamond Cut Diamond aka Blame the Woman	
