= J. P. Lockney =

American actor

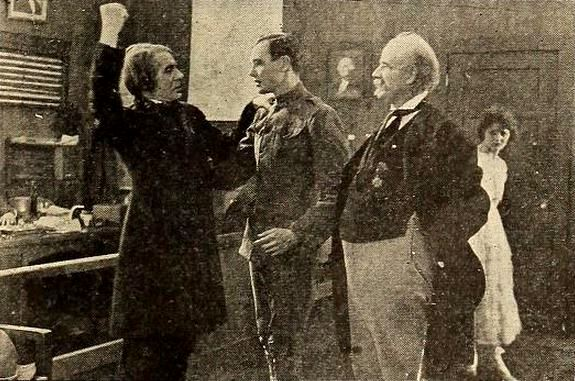
- Lockney (right foreground) in scene from Hay Foot, Straw Foot (1919)
- Born: John P. Loughlin; Philadelphia, Pennsylvania, United States
- Years active: 1915–1937

John P. Loughlin, known professionally as John P. Lockney, was an American actor of the silent film era. He appeared in more than 100 films between 1915 and 1937. He was born in Philadelphia, Pennsylvania.

== Partial filmography ==
- In Slumberland (1917)
- The Bride of Hate (1917)
- The Crab (1917)
- The Gunfighter (1917)
- The Tar Heel Warrior (1917)
- Polly Ann (1917)
- Flying Colors (1917)
- Flare-Up Sal (1918)
- The Guilty Man (1918)
- Fuss and Feathers (1918)
- Partners Three (1919)
- The Sheriff's Son (1919)
- The Egg Crate Wallop (1919)
- The Family Honor (1920)
- Below the Surface (1920)
- A Broadway Cowboy (1920)
- Dice of Destiny (1920)
- Uncharted Channels (1920)
- Down Home (1920)
- The Face of the World (1921)
- Hickville to Broadway (1921)
- Partners of the Tide (1921)
- See My Lawyer (1921)
- The Kiss (1921)
- Rose o' the Sea (1922)
- Just Tony (1922)
- The Bootlegger's Daughter (1922)
- Seeing's Believing (1922)
- Making a Man (1922)
- The Yellow Stain (1922)
- The Prisoner (1923)
- Main Street (1923)
- McGuire of the Mounted (1923)
- Danger Ahead (1923)
- The Dixie Handicap (1924)
- Thundering Romance (1924)
- The Virgin (1924)
- Barriers Burned Away (1925)
- Where the Worst Begins (1925)
- Double Action Daniels (1925)
- The Desperate Game (1926)
- The Windjammer (1926)
- Twisted Triggers (1926)
- Double Daring (1926)
- Sweet Adeline (1926)
- Hearts and Spangles (1926)
- Heroes of the Night (1927)
- Galloping Thunder (1927)
- The Return of Boston Blackie (1927)
- Born to Battle (1927)
- Soda Water Cowboy (1927)
- The American (1927) (not released)
- Vultures of the Sea (1928)
- The Flyin' Buckaroo (1928)
- Smoke Bellew (1929)
- The Voice from the Sky (1930)
