= Wolf Lowry =

1917 film

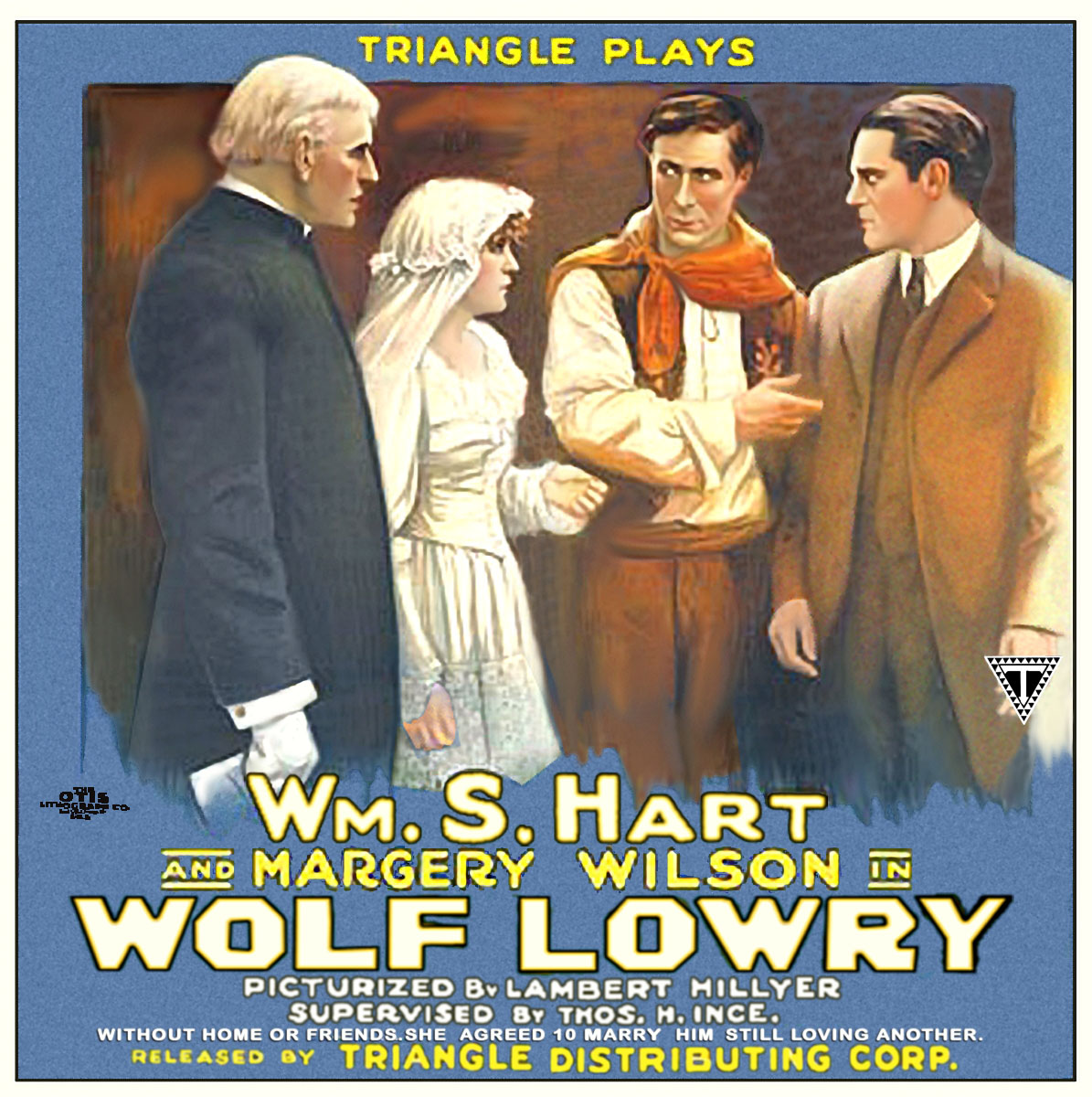
- Film poster
- Directed by: William S. Hart
- Written by: Lambert Hillyer(scenario)
- Based on: The Rancher short story by Charles T. Dazey
- Produced by: Thomas H. Ince
- Starring: William S. Hart; Margery Wilson
- Cinematography: Joseph H. August
- Production company: Kay-Bee
- Distributed by: Triangle Film Corporation
- Release date: May 27, 1917
- Running time: 50 minutes
- Country: United States
- Languages: Silent; English intertitles

Wolf Lowry is a 1917 American silent Western film directed by and starring William S. Hart. It was produced at Kay-Bee Studios and released by Triangle Film Corporation.

Full movie

== Cast ==
- William S. Hart as Tom "Wolf" Lowry
- Aaron Edwards as Buck Fanning
- William Fairbanks as Owen Thorpe (billed as Carl Ullman)
- Margery Wilson as Mary Davis

== Preservation ==
There are multiple surviving film prints at the Library of Congress, George Eastman House, and UCLA Film and Television Archive.
