= The Gunfighter (1917 film) =

1917 film

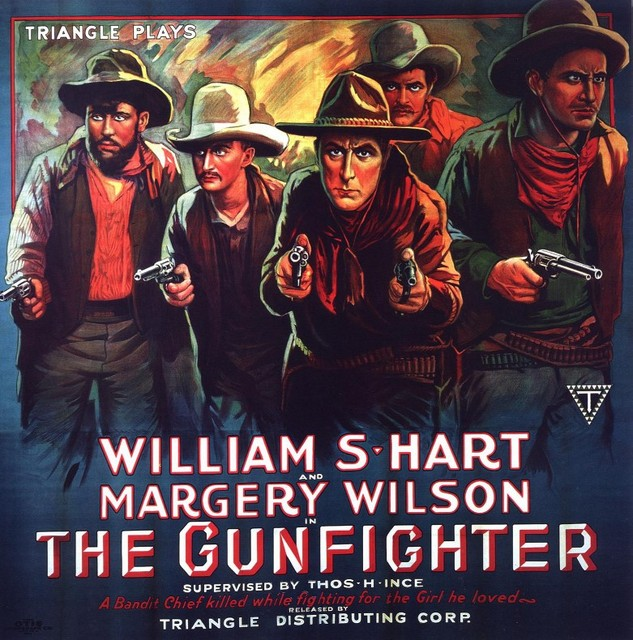
- Film poster
- Directed by: William S. Hart
- Screenplay by: Monte M. Katterjohn
- Produced by: Thomas H. Ince
- Starring: William S. Hart; Margery Wilson; Roy Laidlaw
- Cinematography: Joseph August
- Production company: Kay-Bee Pictures / New York Motion Picture Co.
- Distributed by: Triangle Film Corporation
- Release date: February 11, 1917
- Running time: 5 reels
- Country: United States
- Languages: Silent; English intertitles

The Gun Fighter, on posters The Gunfighter, is a 1917 American silent Western film directed by and starring William S. Hart as the leader of a group of Arizona outlaws, and co-starred Margery Wilson and Roy Laidlaw.

== Cast ==
- William S. Hart as Cliff Hudspeth
- Margery Wilson as Norma Wright
- Roy Laidlaw as El Salvador
- Joseph J. Dowling as 'Ace High' Larkins (credited as J.J. Dowling)
- Milton Ross as 'Cactus' Fuller
- J.P. Lockney as Col. Ellis Lawton
- Georgie Stone as Georgie Stone
