= The Last of the Ingrams =

1917 film

- Directed by: Walter Edwards
- Written by: J.G. Hawks; John Lynch
- Produced by: Thomas H. Ince
- Starring: William Desmond; Margery Wilson; Robert McKim
- Cinematography: Chester A. Lyons
- Production companies: Kay-Bee Pictures; New York Motion Picture
- Distributed by: Triangle Distributing
- Release date: February 25, 1917
- Running time: 50 minutes
- Country: United States
- Languages: Silent; English intertitles

The Last of the Ingrams is a 1917 American silent drama film directed by Walter Edwards and starring William Desmond, Margery Wilson and Robert McKim.

== Cast ==
- William Desmond as Jules Ingram
- Margery Wilson as Mercy Reed
- Robert McKim as Rufus Moore
- Walt Whitman as Israel Spence
- Mary Armlyn as Agnes Moore
- Thelma Salter as Ruth Moore

== Bibliography ==
- Katchmer, George A. A Biographical Dictionary of Silent Film Western Actors and Actresses. McFarland, 2015.
