= The Hand at the Window =

- Directed by: Raymond Wells
- Written by: John A. Moroso
- Starring: Joe King; Margery Wilson; Francis McDonald
- Cinematography: Gus Peterson
- Production company: Triangle Film
- Distributed by: Triangle Distributing
- Release date: April 21, 1918
- Running time: 50 minutes
- Country: United States
- Languages: Silent; English intertitles

The Hand at the Window is a 1918 American silent mystery film directed by Raymond Wells and starring Joe King, Margery Wilson and Francis McDonald.

== Cast ==
- Joe King as Roderick Moran
- Margery Wilson as Laura Bowers
- Francis McDonald as Tony Brachieri
- Irene Hunt as The Calabrian Kid
- Aaron Edwards as O'Brien
- Arthur Millett as Inspector

== Bibliography ==
- Ken Wlaschin. Silent Mystery and Detective Movies: A Comprehensive Filmography. McFarland, 2009.
