= Venus in the East =

1919 film by Donald Crisp

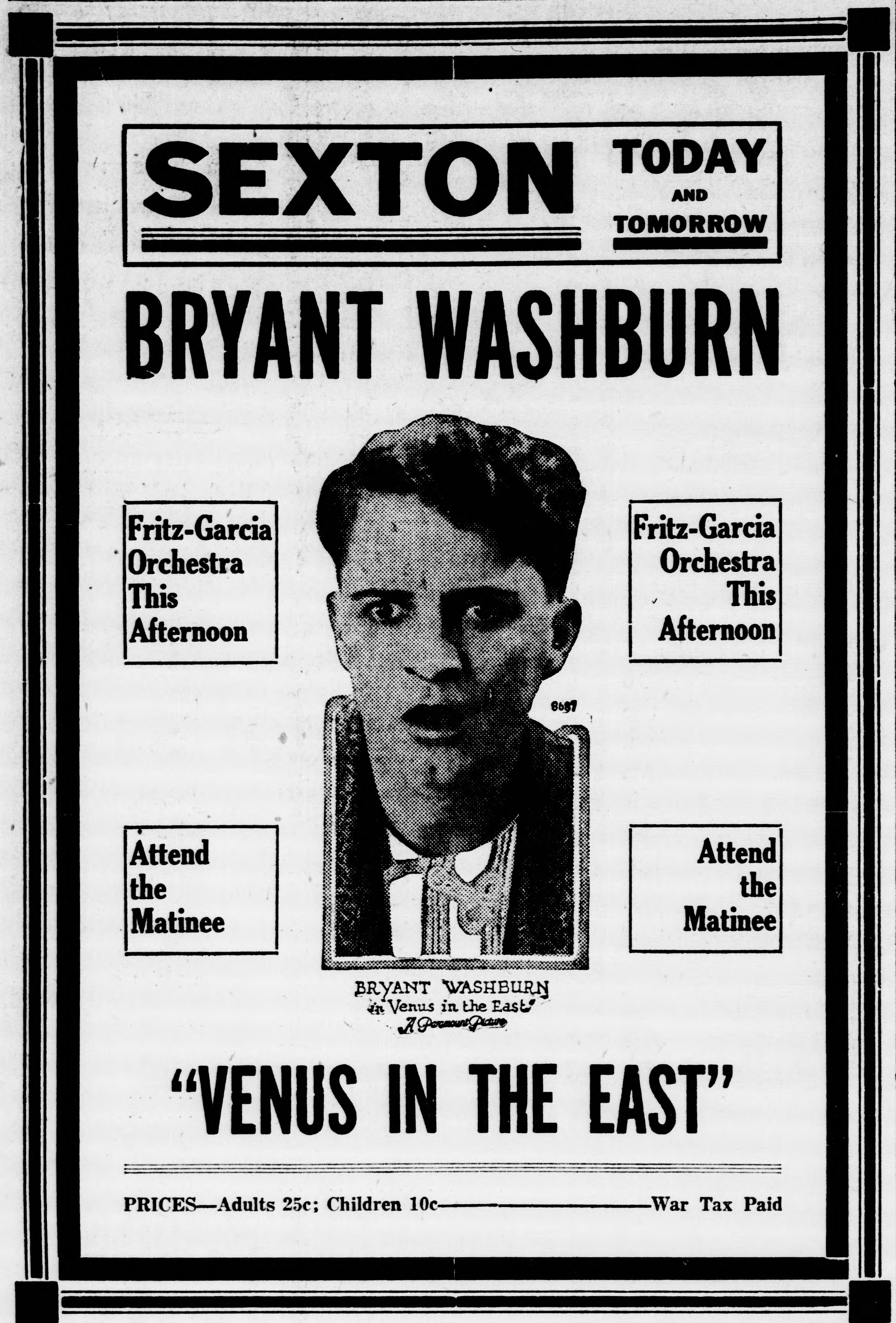
- Newspaper advertisement
- Directed by: Donald Crisp
- Screenplay by: Gardner Hunting; Wallace Irwin
- Produced by: Jesse L. Lasky
- Starring: Bryant Washburn; Margery Wilson; Anna Q. Nilsson; Guy Oliver; Clarence Burton; Julia Faye
- Cinematography: Victor L. Ackland; Charles Edgar Schoenbaum
- Production company: Famous Players–Lasky Corporation
- Distributed by: Paramount Pictures
- Release date: January 26, 1919
- Running time: 50 minutes
- Country: United States
- Language: Silent (English intertitles)

Venus in the East is a 1919 American silent comedy film directed by Donald Crisp, written by Gardner Hunting and Wallace Irwin, and starring Bryant Washburn, Margery Wilson, Anna Q. Nilsson, Guy Oliver, Clarence Burton, and Julia Faye. It was released on January 26, 1919, by Paramount Pictures.

== Cast ==
- Bryant Washburn as Buddy McNair
- Margery Wilson as Martha
- Anna Q. Nilsson as Mrs. Pat Dyvenot
- Guy Oliver as Doc Naylor
- Clarence Burton as Pontius Blint
- Julia Faye as Doric Blint
- Helen Dunbar as Mrs. Blint
- Arthur Edmund Carewe as Middy Knox
- Henry A. Barrows as Terrill Overbeck
- Clarence Geldart as Jass
- Charles K. Gerrard as Maddie Knox

== Preservation ==
With no copies of Venus in the East located in any film archives, it is a lost film.
