= Mothers' Instinct =

Mothers' Instinct may refer to:

- Mothers' Instinct (2018 film), a Belgian psychological thriller film
- Mothers' Instinct (2024 film), a 2024 psychological thriller film and remake of the above
- The maternal bond that forms between a mother and her child

== See also ==
- A Mother's Instinct, a 1996 American mystery drama television film
- The Mother Instinct, a 1917 American silent drama film
