= The Bride of Hate =

1917 film by Walter Edwards

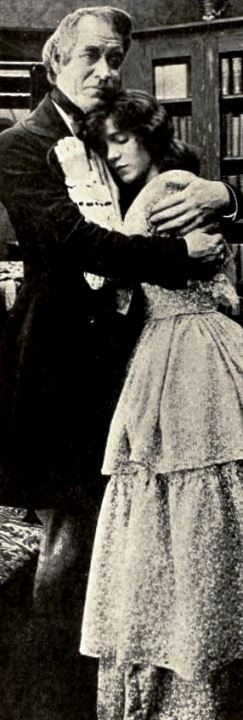
- Still with Keenan and Wilson
- Directed by: Walter Edwards
- Written by: J. G. Hawks; John Lynch
- Produced by: Thomas H. Ince
- Starring: Frank Keenan; Margery Wilson; Jerome Storm
- Cinematography: Charles E. Kaufman
- Production companies: Kay-Bee Pictures; New York Motion Picture
- Distributed by: Triangle Distributing
- Release date: January 14, 1917
- Running time: 50 minutes
- Country: United States
- Languages: Silent; English intertitles

The Bride of Hate is a 1917 American silent drama film directed by Walter Edwards and starring Frank Keenan, Margery Wilson, and Jerome Storm.

== Cast ==
- Frank Keenan as Dr. Dudley Duprez
- Margery Wilson as Mercedes Mendoza
- Jerome Storm as Paul Crenshaw
- David Hartford as Judge Shone
- Elvira Weil as Rose Duprez
- Florence Hale as Mammy Lou
- J. P. Lockney as Don Ramon Alvarez
- Nona Thomas as Don Ramon's Daughter
- John Gilbert as Dr. Duprez's Son

== Preservation ==
With no prints of The Bride of Hate located in any film archives, it is considered a lost film.

== Bibliography ==
- Golden, Eve. John Gilbert: The Last of the Silent Film Stars. University Press of Kentucky, 2013.
