= The Woman in Red (1935 film) =

1935 American drama film

- Theatrical release poster
- Directed by: Robert Florey
- Screenplay by: Mary C. McCall, Jr.; Peter Milne
- Based on: North Shore; 1932 novel by Wallace Irwin
- Produced by: Harry Joe Brown
- Starring: Barbara Stanwyck; Gene Raymond
- Cinematography: Sol Polito
- Edited by: Terry O. Morse
- Music by: Bernhard Kaun
- Production company: Warner Bros. Pictures
- Distributed by: Warner Bros. Pictures
- Release date: February 16, 1935 (US)
- Running time: 68 minutes
- Country: United States
- Language: English

The Woman in Red is a 1935 American drama film directed by Robert Florey and starring Barbara Stanwyck and Gene Raymond. Based on the novel North Shore by Wallace Irwin, the film is about a woman equestrian who meets and falls in love with a traveling polo player from a once wealthy family. After they are married, she is persuaded to entertain a friend's wealthy client aboard a yacht. Another female passenger accidentally drowns, and her friend is arrested for her murder. Determined to keep her name out of the press, the friend does not reveal that he has a witness who can prove his innocence.

== Plot ==
Shelby Barret is a stable hand who rides show horses for snobbish wealthy widow Mrs. Nicholas, nicknamed Nicko. She meets Johnny Wyatt, the destitute son of a once-wealthy Long Island family who plays polo for Nicko. Nouveau-riche Gene Fairchild, a horseman who rides his own entries, is in love with Shelby, while Nicko is in love with Johnny, who has curried her favour. However, despite their efforts, Shelby and Johnny fall in love, and Nicko and Fairchild are jealous of their budding relationship. Nicko fires Shelby, which only encourages Johnny to leave her employ, and they elope to marry. Johnny brings Shelby home to Wyattville, the town named for his family, but his snobbish family does not approve of Shelby and treat her frigidly. They frown even more when the newlyweds start a business handling the horses of wealthy neighbours. Shelby had been expecting a loan from her grandfather in Kentucky to start the business, but when he is unable to provide the money, Shelby borrows from Fairchild without telling the proud but broke Johnny. Nicko soon shows up and starts gossip against Shelby, which does not help matters.

When Johnny is away Fairchild invites Shelby aboard his yacht to help him entertain a wealthy client. She tries to contact Johnny, but when that fails she accepts the invitation. The client and his female companion, chorus girl Olga, show up drunk. Olga accidentally falls overboard and drowns, and Fairchild is accused of her murder. He intends to keep Shelby out of the case although it looks bad for him, while Shelby is afraid of scandal. While the case is in progress, with one of the ship's officers saying that he saw Fairchild leaving the ship with a mysterious "woman in red," the Wyatt family talk about the case. Shelby snaps and confesses that she is the woman in question. She shows up at the court at the last minute to provide witness. The Wyatt family also comes to the court to defend her, if only to protect the family name. Shelby tells the court it was her, and thus she saves Fairchild. She knows that in making her confession she is risking her marriage, and wonders whether Johnny will understand and forgive her, although she has done nothing to be forgiven for. Eugene proposes that Shelby divorce Johnny and marry him, but Shelby says she still loves her husband, even though she is convinced that he is through with her. Shelby walks out of the courthouse to find Johnny waiting for her in his car. He reminds her of their earlier promise that the two of them are a closed corporation, and chides her for crying because she never has a handkerchief. He produces his own and helps her to blow her nose before they embrace.

== Cast ==
- Barbara Stanwyck as Shelby Barret Wyatt
- Gene Raymond as John 'Johnny' Wyatt
- Genevieve Tobin as Mrs. 'Nicko' Nicholas
- John Eldredge as Eugene 'Gene' Fairchild
- Phillip Reed as Dan McCall
- Dorothy Tree as Mrs. Olga Goodyear
- Russell Hicks as Defense Attorney Clayton
- Nella Walker as Aunt Bettina
- Claude Gillingwater as Grandpa Wyatt
- Doris Lloyd as Mrs. Casserly
- Hale Hamilton as Wyatt Furness
- Edward Van Sloan as Prosecuting Attorney Foxall
- Forrester Harvey as Mooney
- Bill Elliott as Stuart Wyatt
- Frederick Vogeding as Nels Erickson
- Brandon Hurst as Uncle Emlen Wyatt
- George Chandler as First Reporter (uncredited)
- Arthur Treacher as Major Albert Casserly (uncredited)
