= The Blooming Angel =

1920 film by Victor Schertzinger

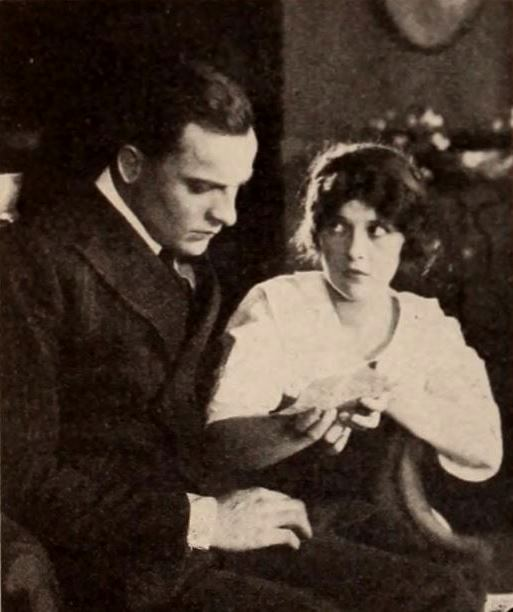
- Directed by: Victor Schertzinger
- Written by: Wallace Irwin (novel)
- Produced by: Samuel Goldwyn
- Starring: Madge Kennedy; Pat O'Malley; Margery Wilson
- Cinematography: George Webber
- Production company: Goldwyn Pictures
- Distributed by: Goldwyn Distributing
- Release date: February 8, 1920
- Running time: 50 minutes
- Country: United States
- Languages: Silent; English intertitles

The Blooming Angel is a 1920 American silent comedy film directed by Victor Schertzinger and starring Madge Kennedy, Pat O'Malley, and Margery Wilson.

== Plot ==
Floss Brannon, ousted from college due to her mischievous behavior, marries Chester Framm, a struggling young student with aspirations of becoming an orator. Facing financial strain from Chester's meager income as an insurance clerk, Floss devises a solution by creating a complexion cream named "Angel Bloom." To leverage Chester's oratory skills for promoting Angel Bloom, Floss orchestrates a plan involving renting an elephant, coating it with the cream, and having Chester endorse the product while riding on the elephant's back.

However, Floss's scheme takes a downturn when the elephant collapses, leading her rival, Carlotta, to accuse her of animal cruelty. Floss's innocence is eventually established during the trial when the elephant unexpectedly recovers and makes a dramatic appearance outside the courtroom window. The resulting publicity brings significant financial success to Chester, Floss, and Angel Bloom.

== Cast ==
- Madge Kennedy as Floss
- Pat O'Malley as Chester Framm
- Margery Wilson as Carlotta
- Arthur Housman as Ramon
- James Robert Chandler as College Professor
- Vera Lewis as Floss's Aunt
- F. Blinn as Appelwaith
- William Courtright as Holbetter

== Bibliography ==
- James Robert Parish & Michael R. Pitts. Film directors: a guide to their American films. Scarecrow Press, 1974. ISBN 9780810807525
