= Chester A. Lyons =

American cinematographer

- Born: May 26, 1885; Westfield, New York, United States
- Died: November 27, 1936 (aged 51); Hollywood, California, United States
- Occupation: Cinematographer
- Years active: 1917–1936 (film)

Chester A. Lyons (1885–1936) was an American cinematographer. Active in the American film industry from 1917 until his death he worked on over eighty films during his career, the majority of them in the silent era. He began his career with Triangle Films and was later employed by Paramount, Fox, First National and MGM.

== Selected filmography ==
- Sudden Jim (1917)
- Time Locks and Diamonds (1917)
- Idolators (1917)
- His Mother's Boy (1917)
- The Last of the Ingrams (1917)
- Love or Justice (1917)
- The Claws of the Hun (1918)
- Playing the Game (1918)
- The Family Skeleton (1918)
- A Nine O'Clock Town (1918)
- The Law of the North (1918)
- String Beans (1918)
- His Own Home Town (1918)
- The Hired Man (1918)
- Hay Foot, Straw Foot (1919)
- The Busher (1919)
- Red Hot Dollars (1919)
- Greased Lightning (1919)
- Bill Henry (1919)
- The Girl Dodger (1919)
- Crooked Straight (1919)
- Alarm Clock Andy (1920)
- The Village Sleuth (1920)
- Paris Green (1920)
- Homer Comes Home (1920)
- Get-Rich-Quick Wallingford (1921)
- The Bootlegger's Daughter (1922)
- The Valley of Silent Men (1922)
- The Good Provider (1922)
- Sisters (1922)
- Back Pay (1922)
- The Pride of Palomar (1922)
- The Nth Commandment (1923)
- The Man Life Passed By (1923)
- Children of Dust (1923)
- Just Like a Woman (1923)
- The Age of Desire (1923)
- Happiness (1924)
- Flaming Love (1925)
- The Only Thing (1925)
- The Circle (1925)
- Man and Maid (1925)
- Daddy's Gone A-Hunting (1925)
- The Gentle Cyclone (1926)
- The First Year (1926)
- Love Makes 'Em Wild (1927)
- Women's Wares (1927)
- Night Life (1927)
- Nameless Men (1928)
- The Gateway of the Moon (1928)
- Mother Machree (1928)
- Clothes Make the Woman (1928)
- A Woman Against the World (1928)
- The Power of the Press (1928)
- The Naughty Duchess (1928)
- Bachelor's Paradise (1928)
- Lucky Star (1929)
- They Had to See Paris (1929)
- Fugitives (1929)
- Lightnin' (1930)
- Not Damaged (1930)
- Song o' My Heart (1930)
- Liliom (1930)
- Bad Girl (1931)
- Young as You Feel (1931)
- Deception (1932)
- Bombshell (1933)
- What Price Decency (1933)
- Sequoia (1934)
- Under the Pampas Moon (1935)
- Mad Love (1935)
- White Hunter (1936)
- Robin Hood of El Dorado (1936)
- Three Live Ghosts (1936)

== Bibliography ==
- Dixon, Wheeler Winston. Black and White Cinema: A Short History. Rutgers University Press, 2015.
- Kear, Lynn. Laurette Taylor, American Stage Legend. McFarland, 2014.
