= Mountain Dew (disambiguation) =

Mountain Dew is a carbonated soft drink brand produced and owned by PepsiCo.

Mountain Dew may also refer to:

- Nevis Mountain Dew, 1978 play by Steve Carter
- Mountain Dew (film), a 1917 American silent comedy-drama film

== Songs ==
- "The Rare Old Mountain Dew", Irish folk song dating from 1882
- "Good Old Mountain Dew", 1928/1935 Appalachian folk song by Bascom Lunsford and Scotty Wiseman
- "Mountain Dew", 1960 song by the Stanley Brothers
- "Diet Mountain Dew" (song), 2011 song by Lana Del Rey

== See also ==
- Mount Dewe, mountain with a similar name
- Dew
