= Wild Sumac =

1917 film

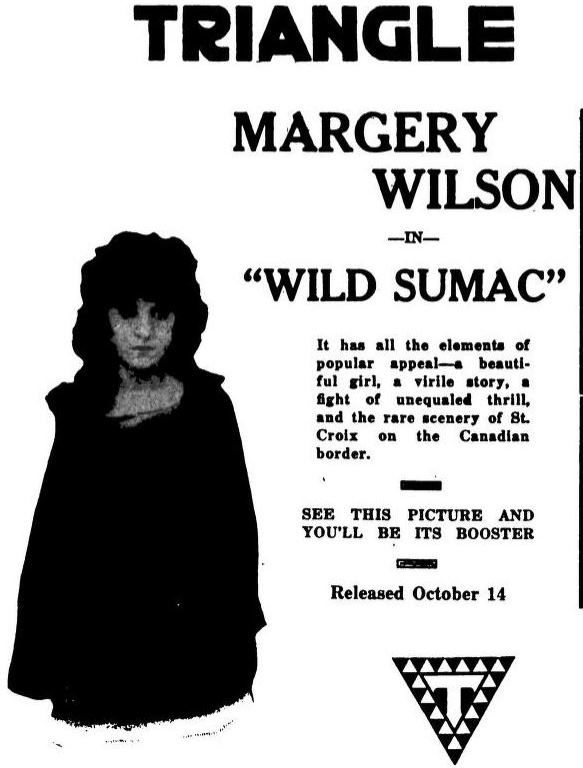
- Directed by: William V. Mong
- Written by: Elaine S. Carrington; Jack Cunningham
- Starring: Margery Wilson; Ed Brady; Frank Brownlee
- Cinematography: Edward Gheller
- Production company: Triangle Film Corporation
- Distributed by: Triangle Distributing
- Release date: October 14, 1917
- Running time: 50 minutes
- Country: United States
- Languages: Silent; English intertitles

Wild Sumac is a 1917 American silent Western drama film directed by William V. Mong and starring Margery Wilson, Ed Brady and Frank Brownlee.

== Cast ==
- Margery Wilson as Wild Sumac
- Ed Brady as John Lewisa
- Frank Brownlee as Lupin
- Wilbur Higby as Armand du Fere
- Ray Jackson as Pierre du Fere
- Percy Challenger as Deacon Bricketts
- George Chesebro as Jacques Fontaine

== Bibliography ==
- Langman, Larry. A Guide to Silent Westerns. Greenwood Publishing Group, 1992.
