= The Primal Lure =

1916 film directed by William S. Hart

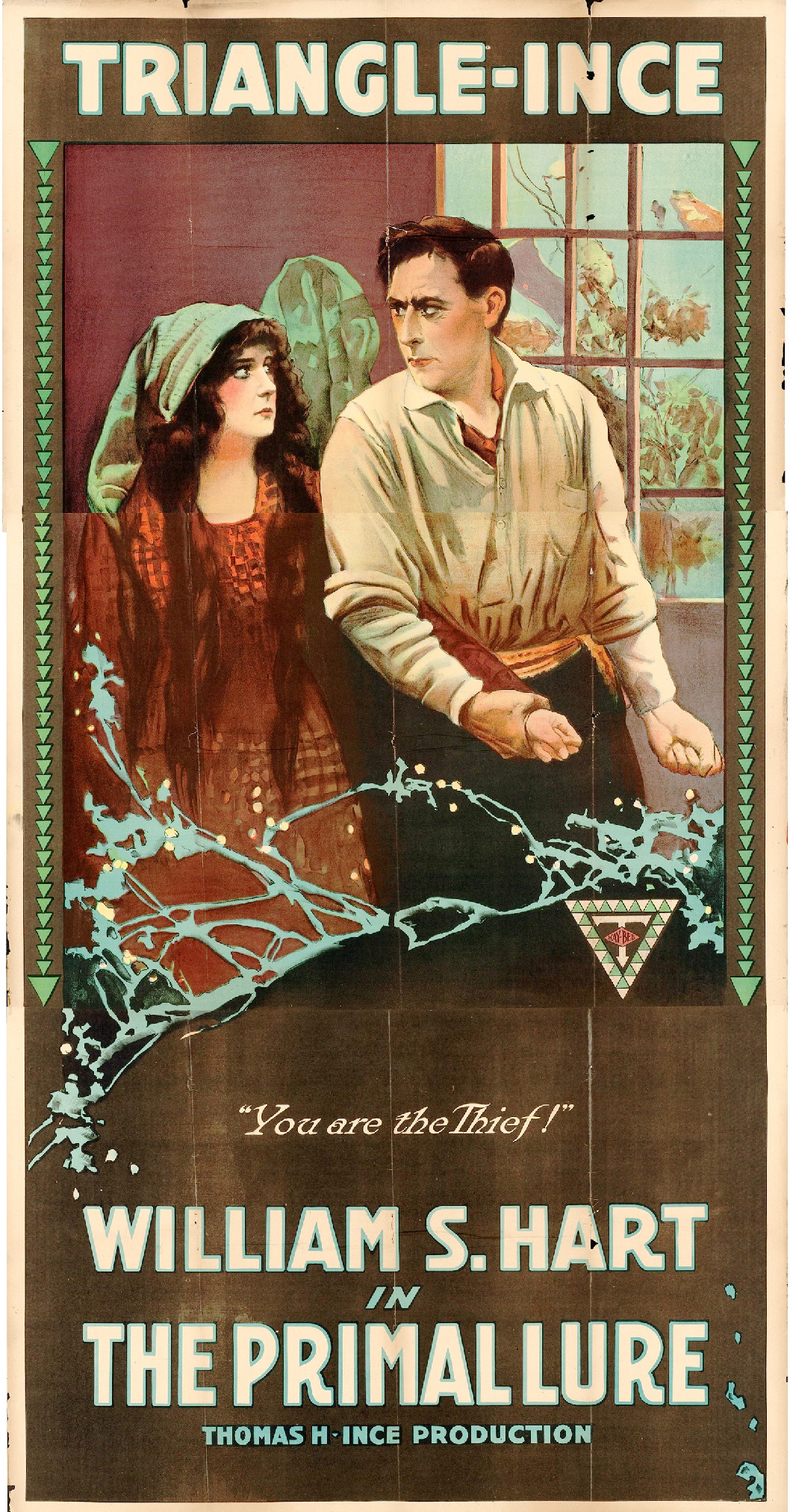
- Directed by: William S. Hart
- Written by: J. G. Hawks
- Based on: The Primal Lure: A Romance of Fort Lu Cerne (novel) by Vingie E. Roe
- Produced by: Thomas H. Ince
- Starring: William S. Hart; Margery Wilson
- Cinematography: Joseph H. August
- Distributed by: Triangle Film Corporation
- Release date: May 21, 1916
- Running time: 50 minutes
- Country: United States
- Languages: Silent; English intertitles

The Primal Lure is a mostly lost 1916 silent film western directed by and starring William S. Hart. Footage surfaced in 2023 on YouTube.

== Cast ==
- William S. Hart as Angus McConnell
- Margery Wilson as Lois Le Moyne
- Robert McKim as Richard Sylvester
- Jerome Storm as Pierre Vernaisse
- Joe Goodboy as Indian Chief
