= The Desert Man =

1917 film

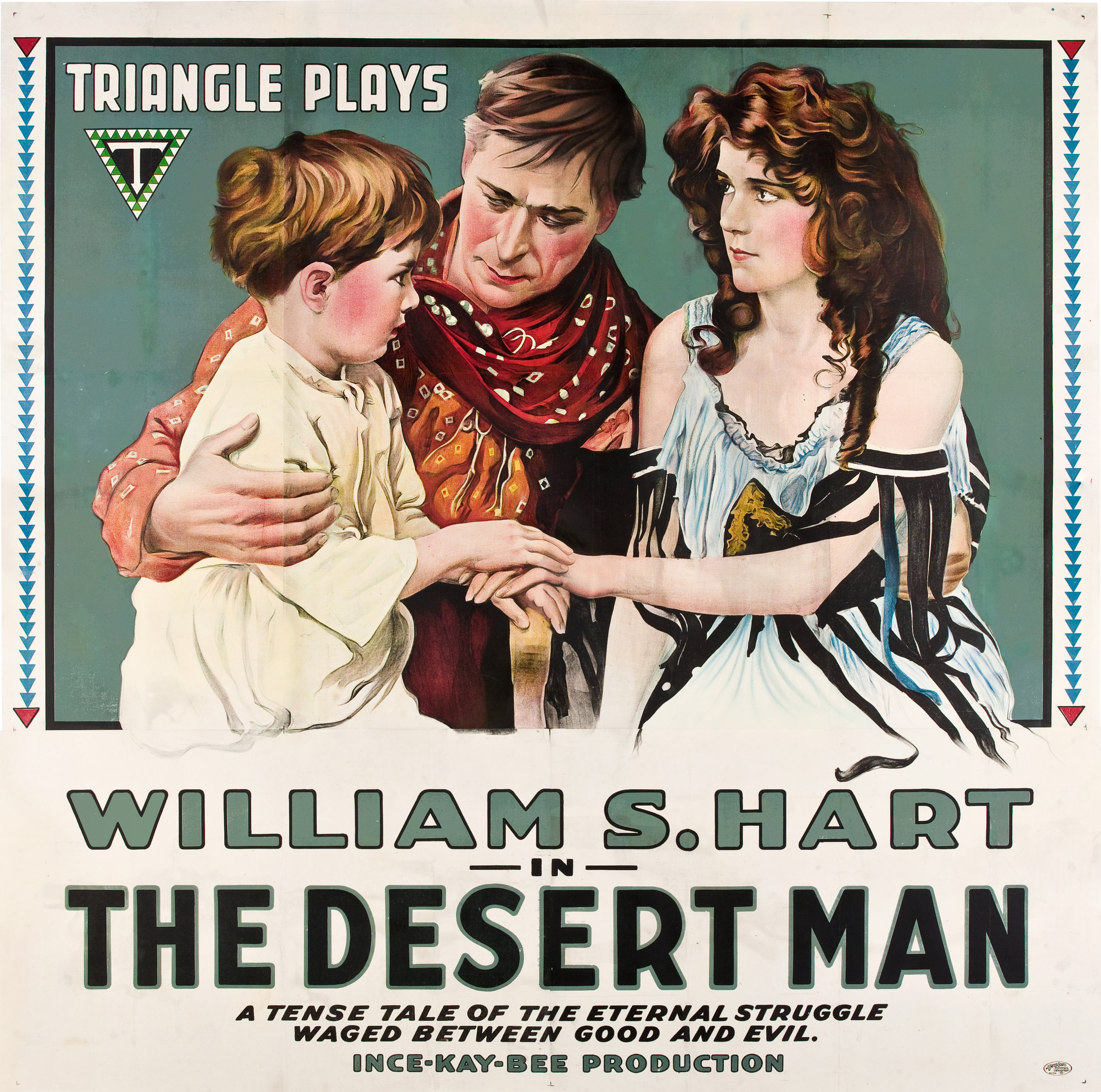
- Film poster
- Directed by: William S. Hart
- Written by: Martin Brown (story); Lambert Hillyer (scenario)
- Produced by: New York Motion Picture Corporation
- Starring: William S. Hart; Margery Wilson
- Cinematography: Joseph H. August
- Distributed by: Triangle Film Corporation
- Release date: April 22, 1917
- Running time: 5 reels
- Country: United States
- Languages: Silent; English intertitles

The Desert Man is a 1917 silent film Western directed by and starring William S. Hart. It was distributed by Triangle Film Corporation.

A fragment or incomplete print exists.

== Cast ==
- William S. Hart - Jim Alton
- Margery Wilson - Jennie
- Buster Irving - Joey
- Henry Belmar - Razor Joe
- Milton Ross - Tacoma Jake
- Jack Livingston - Dr. Howard
- Walt Whitman - Old Burnss
- Josephine Headley - Katy
