= String Beans (film) =

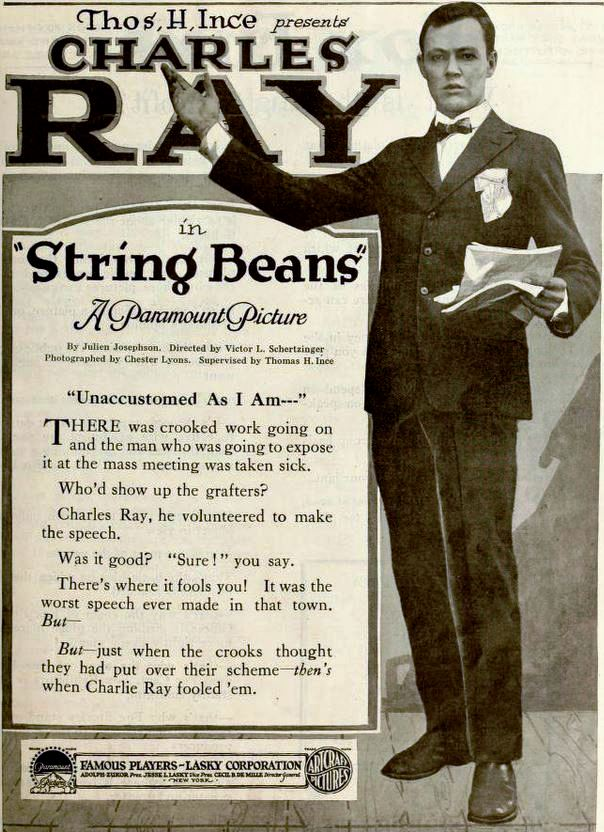
- Advertisement
- Directed by: Victor Schertzinger
- Screenplay by: Julien Josephson
- Produced by: Thomas H. Ince
- Starring: Charles Ray; Jane Novak; J. P. Lockney; Donald MacDonald
- Cinematography: Chester A. Lyons
- Edited by: W. Duncan Mansfield
- Production company: Thomas H. Ince Corporation
- Distributed by: Paramount Pictures
- Release date: December 29, 1918
- Running time: 50 minutes
- Country: United States
- Language: Silent (English intertitles)

String Beans is a 1918 American silent comedy film directed by Victor Schertzinger, written by Julien Josephson, and starring Charles Ray, Jane Novak, J. P. Lockney, Donald MacDonald, Al W. Filson, and Otto Hoffman. It was released on December 29, 1918, by Paramount Pictures.

== Plot ==
As described in a film magazine, Toby Watkins is a farmhand who writes poetry for the local paper, the Sabert Weekly Clarion, much to his uncle's disgust. Following a quarrel in which he beats his uncle, he is ordered away from home. He gets a position at the paper as a bill collector and is soon elevated to the foreman of the composing room. Kendall Reeves, a crook, comes to town and plans to mulct the populace by starting a canning factory. A tramp printer recognizes Reeves as a former jailbird and makes him agree to split with him. Toby overhears the plot and when Bartrum, the editor, becomes too ill to speak in opposition to the scheme, Toby agrees to take his place. On the platform, however, Toby loses his nerve and beats an ignominious retreat in the middle of his address. Reeves later attempts to force the mayor, Lot Morris, to give him $5000 on account at the point of a revolver. The daughter Jean calls up Toby who then arrives in time to save the mayor and capture the crook. He also wins the hand of the mayor's daughter.

== Cast ==
- Charles Ray as Toby Watkins
- Jane Novak as Jean Morris
- J. P. Lockney as Zachary Bartrum (credited as John P. Lockney)
- Donald MacDonald as Kendall Reeves
- Al W. Filson as Lot Morris (credited as Al Filson)
- Otto Hoffman as Joe Farley
- Dorothy Devore as Minor Role (uncredited)
