= The Man Life Passed By =

1923 film directed by Victor Schertzinger

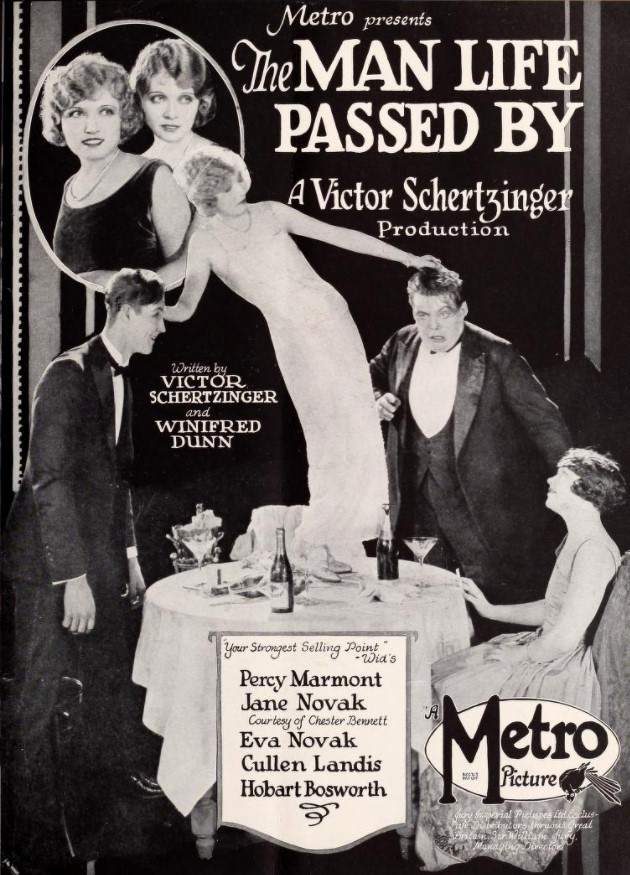
- Directed by: Victor Schertzinger
- Written by: Victor Schertzinger; Winifred Dunn
- Starring: Percy Marmont; Jane Novak; Eva Novak
- Cinematography: Chester A. Lyons
- Production company: Metro Pictures
- Distributed by: Metro Pictures
- Release date: December 24, 1923
- Running time: 70 minutes
- Country: United States
- Language: Silent (English intertitles)

The Man Life Passed By is a 1923 American silent drama film directed by Victor Schertzinger and starring Percy Marmont, Jane Novak, and Eva Novak. The Novak sisters portray two sisters in the film.

== Plot ==
As described in a film magazine review, John Turbin is robbed of his invention by 'Iron Man' Moore. His mother dies, and his only friend is Miss Hope who, unknown to Turbin, is one of Moore's daughters. Because of her influence, Turbin saves the other daughter Joy. Mr. Moore is so grateful that he does the right thing by Turbin and he accepts the love between Turbin and Hope.

== Cast ==
- Percy Marmont as John Turbin
- Jane Novak as Hope Moore
- Eva Novak as Joy Moore
- Cullen Landis as Harold Trevis
- Hobart Bosworth as 'Iron Man' Moore
- Lydia Knott as John's Mother
- Gertrude Short as Paula
- Francis X. Bushman Jr. as Jerry
- Lincoln Stedman as Muggsy
- George Siegmann as Crogan
- George Beranger as Leo Friend
- Larry Fisher as Peters
- William Humphrey as The Lawyer

== Preservation ==
A complete print of The Man Life Passed By is held by Gosfilmofond.

== Bibliography ==
- James Robert Parish & Michael R. Pitts. Film directors: a guide to their American films. Scarecrow Press, 1974.
