= His Own Home Town =

- Directed by: Victor Schertzinger
- Screenplay by: Larry Evans
- Produced by: Thomas H. Ince
- Starring: Charles Ray; Katherine MacDonald; Charles K. French; Otto Hoffman; Andrew Arbuckle; Karl Formes
- Cinematography: Chester A. Lyons
- Production company: Famous Players–Lasky Corporation
- Distributed by: Paramount Pictures
- Release date: May 27, 1918
- Running time: 50 minutes
- Country: United States
- Language: Silent (English intertitles)

His Own Home Town is a 1918 American silent drama film directed by Victor Schertzinger and written by Larry Evans. The film stars Charles Ray, Katherine MacDonald, Charles K. French, Otto Hoffman, Andrew Arbuckle, and Karl Formes. The film was released on May 27, 1918, by Paramount Pictures.

== Plot ==
As described in a film magazine, an outcast from home, Jimmy Duncan goes to New York City where, under an assumed name, he becomes famous as a playwright. His childhood sweetheart Carol, also goes to the city seeking success on the stage. On the death of Carol's father Jimmy inherits the Chronicle, a newspaper he had been publishing in Worcester. Jimmy returns to clean out the corrupt gang of city politicians using the paper. The extra he prints brings the politicians to his office, including Jimmy's own father, the Rev. John Duncan. Upon their promise to leave town within the next twenty-four hours, Jimmy suppresses the next edition of the newspaper. His play is also accepted and Carol becomes famous as its leading lady.

== Cast ==
- Charles Ray as Jimmy Duncan
- Katherine MacDonald as Carol Landis
- Charles K. French as T. Elihu Banks
- Otto Hoffman as Tivotson
- Andrew Arbuckle as Rev. John Duncan
- Karl Formes as David Landis
- Milton Ross as Justice Jameson

== Reception ==
Like many American films of the time, His Own Home Town was subject to restrictions and cuts by city and state film censorship boards. For example, the Chicago Board of Censors cut, in Reel 2, the second and third gambling scenes, Reel 3, third and fourth gambling scenes, Reel 5, shooting Jimmy Duncan.
