= Flaming Love =

1925 film by Victor Schertzinger

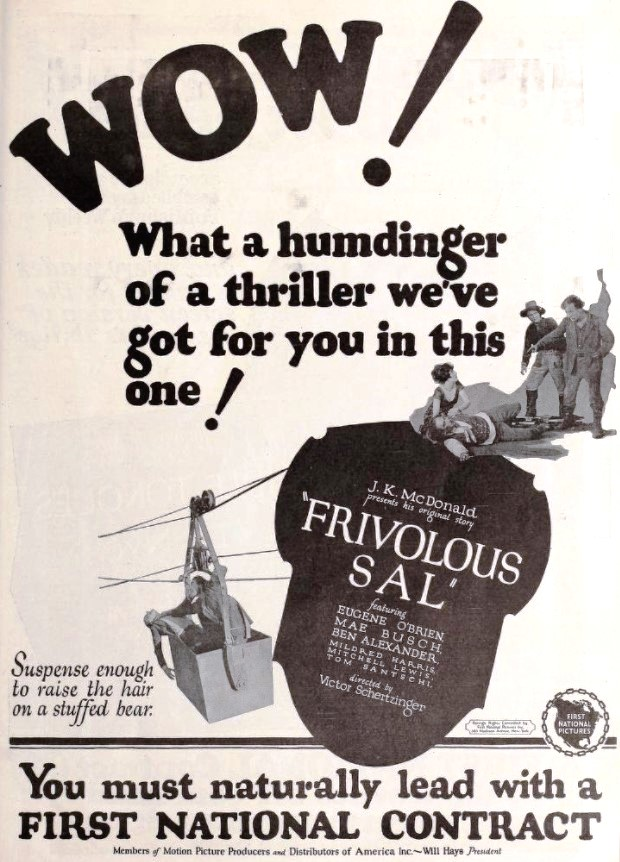
- Advertisement
- Directed by: Victor Schertzinger
- Written by: Lois Zellner
- Story by: J.K. McDonald
- Starring: Eugene O'Brien; Mae Busch; Ben Alexander
- Cinematography: Chester A. Lyons; George Richter
- Edited by: Beth Matz; Robert R. Snody
- Production company: J.K. McDonald Productions
- Distributed by: First National Pictures
- Release date: January 4, 1925 (United States)
- Running time: 80 minutes
- Country: United States
- Languages: Silent; English intertitles

Flaming Love, also known as Frivolous Sal, is a 1925 American silent Western film directed by Victor Schertzinger for First National Pictures. The film involves a female saloon owner in the Old West, her weak-willed new actor husband, and his young son from a previous relationship.

== Plot ==
As described in a review in a film magazine, when Roland Keene's wife dies, he goes West with a theatrical troupe, leaving his young son Benny in New York. In Placer Valley he meets Sal Flood, owner of a saloon she inherited from her father. Benny arrives in Placer Valley just in time to witness his father marrying Sal. Roland takes over running the saloon and is being milked by Osner, a professional gambler, when Steve McGregor, a friend of Sal, intervenes. After a bloody fight, Steve whips the gambler. Sal then takes over the saloon. To meet his gambling debts, Roland is compelled by Osner to open the saloon's safe, which has Steve's gold. When the safe is opened, Benny through a window sees Osner taking the metal. The building is blasted by Osner, and Benny is injured by debris from the building. Benny shields his father when the Sheriff investigates, and Roland sets out to get Osner and return the gold. Osner flees to a tram car, and Roland jumps on it as it begins to travel down from one mountain and then up the next slope. In mid-air he succeeds in spilling Osner to freefall from the tram car to some tree tops far below, but then Roland loses his own grip to luckily land safely on a sandy bank.

== Cast ==
- Eugene O'Brien as Roland Keene
- Mae Busch as Sal Flood
- Ben Alexander as Benny Keene
- Tom Santschi as Steve McGregor
- Mitchell Lewis as Osner
- Mildred Harris as Chita

== Production ==
The film was partially shot in Mount Rainier National Park in northwest Washington. Schertzinger and his crew of 38 arrived at the park in mid-August and stayed through early September, lodging at the Paradise Inn. The story was based on experiences that writer-producer J.K. McDonald had working in the logging and mining camps in the Pacific Northwest.

Reviews noted the amount of drinking that takes place during the film, which is set in a time prior to Prohibition's ban on alcoholic drinks in 1920.

== Preservation ==
With no prints of Flaming Love / Frivolous Sal located in any film archives, it is a lost film.
