= Margery Wilson =

American actress

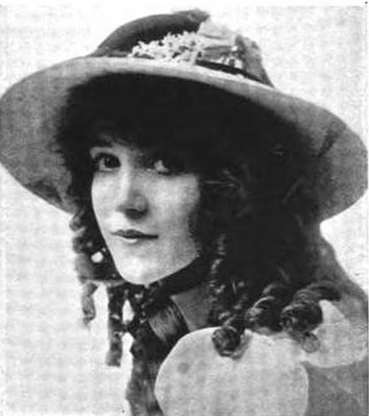
- Born: Sara Barker Strayer; October 31, 1896; Gracey, Kentucky, US
- Died: January 21, 1986 (aged 89)
- Occupations: Film director; screenwriter; actress
- Spouses: Otto Meeks; Grover Paulette Williamson; Vance Link Bushnell
- Children: 2

Margery Wilson (born Sara Barker Strayer; October 31, 1896 – January 21, 1986) was an American actress, writer, and silent movie director. She appeared in 51 films between 1914 and 1939.

== Early life and education ==
Wilson was born in Gracey, Kentucky as Sara Barker Strayer, the daughter of Mr. and Mrs. Holmes B. Strayer.

She received higher education in philosophy and literature while also pursuing social service work. Starting out, Wilson gave public performances in Cincinnati at clubs, schools, and churches. Later, she was able to tour from Ohio to Atlanta with the John Lawrence Players as the leading lady.

By the age of 16, she founded her own theater company. She and her sister left for London on a world tour as musical entertainers. She changed her name when she was 16 in 1913 because her relatives disliked having the family name associated with acting.

== Film career ==
In 1914, Wilson traveled to Los Angeles to pursue a career in Hollywood. She was in a wide range of motion pictures but is best known for her portrayal of Brown Eyes, a character in the D. W. Griffith film Intolerance. She had three dozen roles, many of them leads.

Wilson also was one of Hollywood's earliest women directors. Her career as a film writer, director, and producer was short, lasting from 1920 to 1922. Those three years did not include the time she toured with her films. She directed at least three movies: That Something (1920), The Offenders (1921), and Insinuation (1922). There are no surviving prints of any of her directing efforts. She finished her work as a film director by her late twenties.

== Personal life and later life ==
Wilson had two children. Both of them predeceased her. She left the film production business to take care of her children after marrying Otto Meeks, the owner of a ranching empire (or "a prominent Western industrialist"). After his death, she married Grover Paulette Williamson. Her third husband, Vance Link Bushnell, died in 1947. Although she was no longer in film production, she stayed connected to the business by contributing to pamphlets about famous people. Owing to her Hollywood connections, she was able to write 50 of the pamphlets.

== Professional achievements ==
She wrote guidance books that coached husbands on how to protect and treat their wives. In 1951, her book How to Make the Most of Wife was published. These books could also be considered inspirational nonfiction. Her autobiography, I Found My Way, was published in 1956.

== Partial filmography ==
- The Lucky Transfer (1915, short) - The little girl
- Double Trouble (1915) - Elizabeth Waldron
- The Primal Lure (1916) - Lois Le Moyne
- Eye of the Night (1916) - Jane
- Intolerance (1916) - Brown Eyes
- The Return of Draw Egan (1916) - Myrtle Buckton
- A Corner in Colleens (1916) - Rose
- The Honorable Algy (1916) - Patricia
- The Sin Ye Do (1916) - Alice Ward
- The Habit of Happiness (1916)
- The Bride of Hate (1917) - Mercedes Mendoza
- The Gunfighter (1917) - Norma Wright
- The Last of the Ingrams (1917) - Mercy Reed
- The Desert Man (1917) - Jennie
- Wolf Lowry (1917) - Mary Davis
- The Clodhopper (1917) - Mary Martin
- The Mother Instinct (1917) - Marie Coutierre
- Mountain Dew (1917) - Roxie Bradley
- Wild Sumac (1917) - Wild Sumac
- Without Honor (1918) - Jeanie McGregor
- The Flames of Chance (1918) - Jeanette Gontreau
- The Hard Rock Breed (1918) - Shiela Dolan
- The Law of the Great Northwest (1918) - Marie Monest
- The Hand at the Window (1918) - Laura Bowers
- Old Love for New (1918) - Gwendolyn Alcot
- Marked Cards (1918) - Ellen Shannon
- Venus in the East (1919) - Martha
- Crooked Straight (1919) - Vera Owen
- Desert Gold (1919) - Mercedes Castenada
- The Blooming Angel (1920) - Carlotta
- That Something (1920, co-director) - Dorah Holmes
- The House of Whispers (1920) - Clara Bradford
- Why Not Marry? (1922)
- Insinuation (1922, director) - Mary Wright
- The Offenders (1922, co-director)
