= The Mother Instinct =

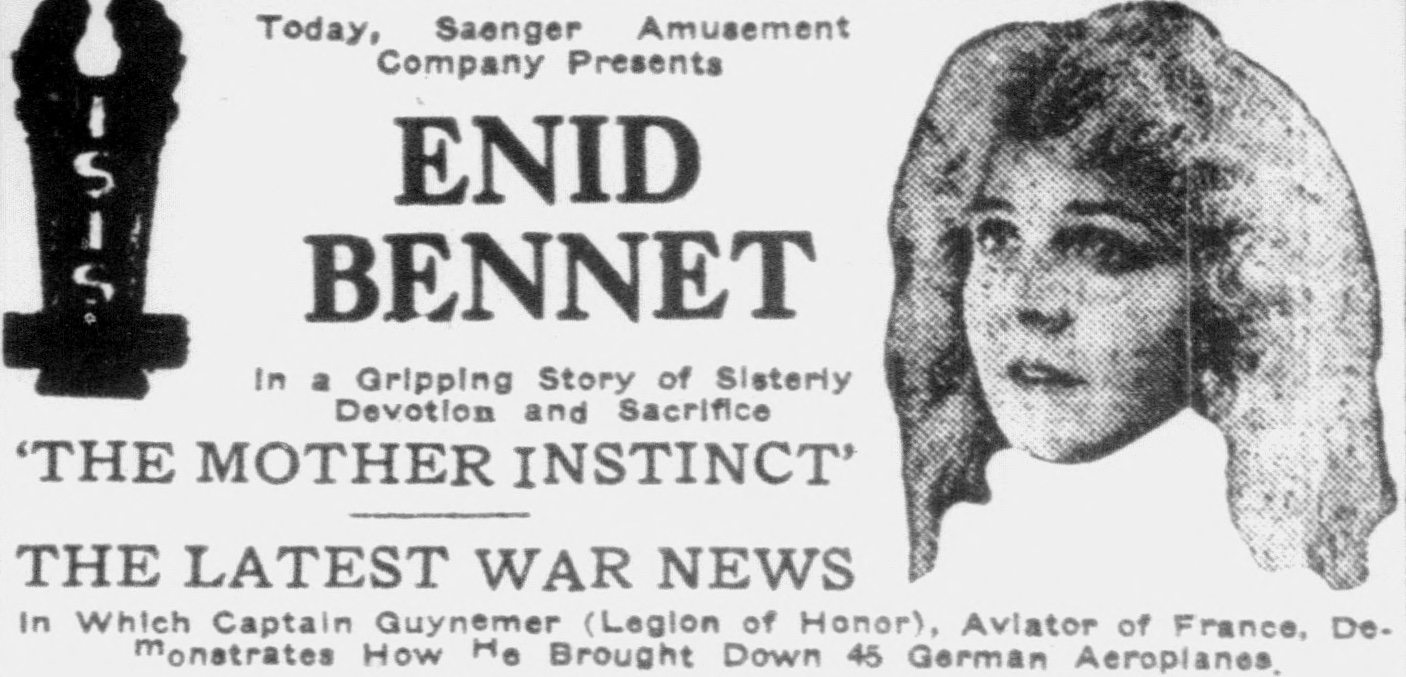
- Contemporary advertisement
- Directed by: Lambert Hillyer; Roy William Neill
- Written by: Lambert Hillyer; Maude Pettus
- Starring: Enid Bennett; Rowland V. Lee; Margery Wilson
- Production company: Triangle Film Corporation
- Distributed by: Triangle Distributing
- Release date: July 15, 1917
- Running time: 50 minutes
- Country: United States
- Languages: Silent; English intertitles

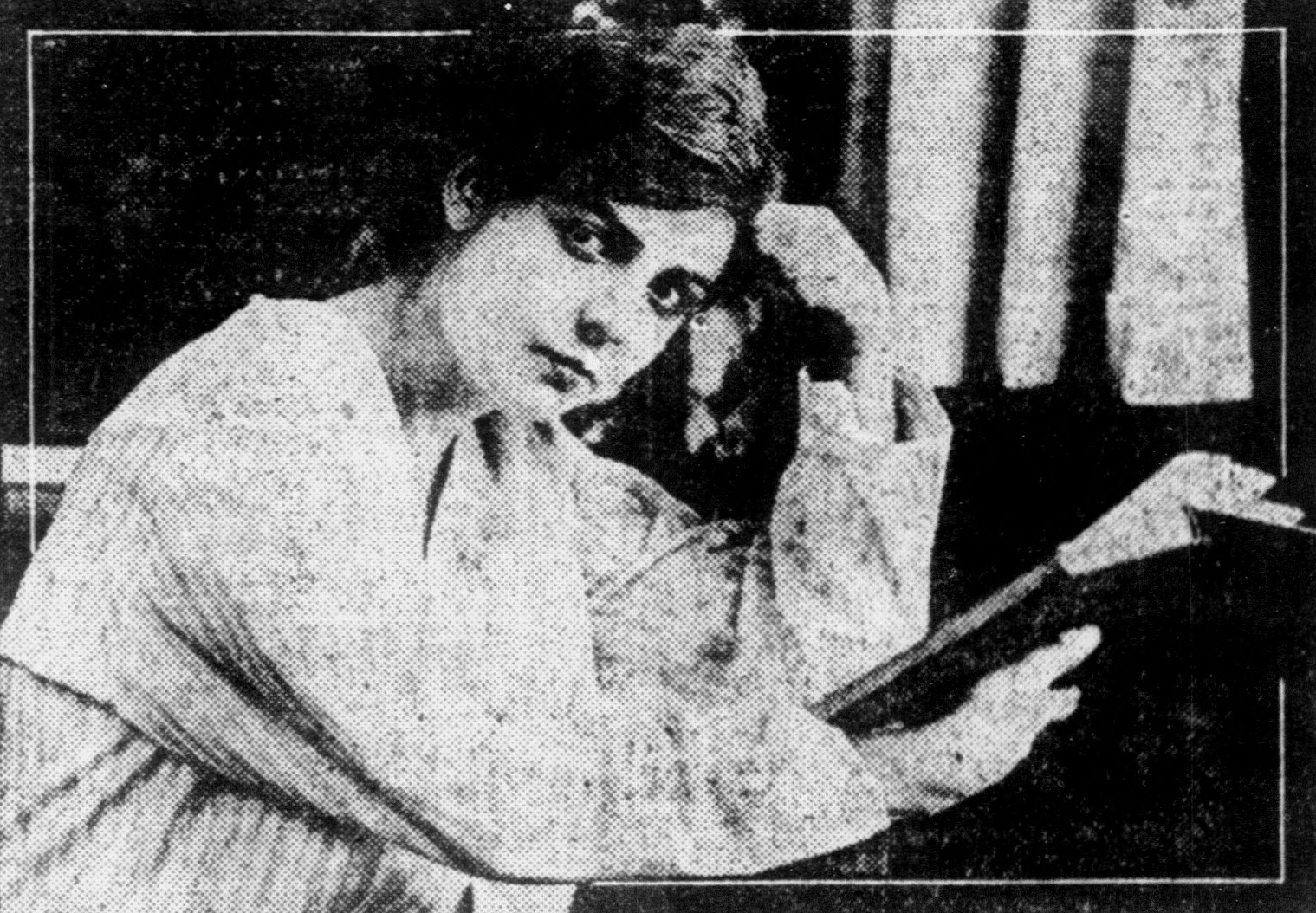
Enid Bennett in a publicity photo for the film.

The Mother Instinct is a 1917 American silent drama film directed by Lambert Hillyer and Roy William Neill and starring Enid Bennett, Rowland V. Lee and Margery Wilson.

== Cast ==
- Enid Bennett as Eleanor Coutierre
- Rowland V. Lee as Jacques
- Margery Wilson as Marie Coutierre
- Tod Burns as Pierre Bondel
- John Gilbert as Jean Coutierre
- Gertrude Claire as Mother Coutierre
- William Fairbanks as Raoul Bergere

== Preservation ==
With no prints of The Mother Instinct located in any film archives, it is considered a lost film.

== Bibliography ==
- Golden, Eve. John Gilbert: The Last of the Silent Film Stars. University Press of Kentucky, 2013.
