= The Family Skeleton =

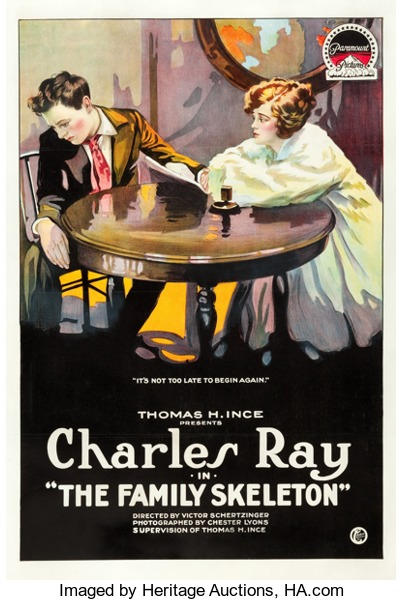
- Directed by: Victor Schertzinger; Jerome Storm
- Screenplay by: Thomas H. Ince; Bert Lennon
- Produced by: Thomas H. Ince
- Starring: Charles Ray; Sylvia Breamer; Andrew Arbuckle; William Elmer; Otto Hoffman; Jack Dyer
- Cinematography: Chester A. Lyons
- Production company: Thomas H. Ince Corporation
- Distributed by: Paramount Pictures
- Release date: March 31, 1918
- Running time: 50 minutes
- Country: United States
- Language: Silent (English intertitles)

The Family Skeleton is a surviving 1918 American silent drama film directed by Victor Schertzinger and Jerome Storm and written by Thomas H. Ince and Bert Lennon. The film stars Charles Ray, Sylvia Breamer, Andrew Arbuckle, William Elmer, Otto Hoffman, and Jack Dyer. The film was released on March 31, 1918, by Paramount Pictures.

== Plot ==
As described in a film magazine, Billy Bates believes that he has inherited the desire for strong drink from his father and, in order to live apart from his friends unmolested, he retires to a cheap saloon where each day finds him sinking lower. Poppy Drayton loves Billy and decides to save him from himself. She hatches a plan that makes Billy believe that she has been kidnapped, and Billy finds that he can do without John Barleycorn when the safety of the woman he loves is at stake.

== Cast ==
- Charles Ray as Billy Bates
- Sylvia Breamer as Poppy Drayton
- Andrew Arbuckle as Dr. Griggs
- William Elmer as 'Spider' Doyle
- Otto Hoffman as Billy's Valet
- Jack Dyer as Wheeler

== Reception ==
Like many American films of the time, The Family Skeleton was subject to cuts by city and state film censorship boards. For example, the Chicago Board of Censors required cuts in Reel 3 of four closeups of woman seated at table with men drinking and to reduce length by half of all other scenes of women shown drinking.

== Preservation ==
Prints are extant in the Library of Congress collection and at the Gosfilmofond Russian State archive.
