= Bill Henry (film) =

1919 film by Jerome Storm

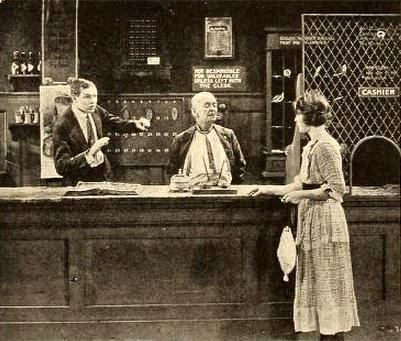
- Still showing Charles Ray, Bert Woodruff, and Edith Roberts
- Directed by: Jerome Storm
- Screenplay by: Julien Josephson; Lois Zellner
- Produced by: Thomas H. Ince
- Starring: Charles Ray; Edith Roberts; William A. Carroll; Bert Woodruff; Jennie Lee; Walter Perkins
- Cinematography: Chester A. Lyons
- Edited by: Ralph Dixon
- Production companies: Thomas H. Ince Corporation; Famous Players–Lasky Corporation
- Distributed by: Paramount Pictures
- Release date: August 17, 1919
- Running time: 50 minutes
- Country: United States
- Language: Silent (English intertitles)

Bill Henry is a 1919 American silent comedy film directed by Jerome Storm, and written by Julien Josephson and Lois Zellner. The film stars Charles Ray, Edith Roberts, William A. Carroll, Bert Woodruff, Jennie Lee, and Walter Perkins. The film was released on August 17, 1919, by Paramount Pictures. A print of the film is in the Russian Gosfilmofond film archive.

== Plot ==
As described in a film magazine, Bill Henry Jenkins leaves the family farm with a patent vibrator under his arm and speeds across the nation on his bicycle in search of fortune. He is assaulted by an irate farmer and takes refuge in a small town hotel run by his uncle, where he gets a position as a clerk. Lela Mason comes to the hotel, having spent her last cent to arrive there. She has inherited a piece of farm land only to be told by the local lawyer that it is worthless, which raised Bill Henry's sympathy. He plays poker with the traveling men to win enough money to buy the property, keeping Lela ignorant as to the buyer's identity. A land salesman offers Bill Henry a much greater price for the land and Bill sells it, telling the lawyer to turn the money over to Lela. Instead, the lawyer pockets the money and accuses Bill Henry of knowingly cheating the young woman. His uncle turns him in, but Lela remains faithful. Bill Henry returns, beats up the lawyer and makes him confess his deception, and marries the young woman.

== Cast ==
- Charles Ray as Bill Henry Jenkins
- Edith Roberts as Lela Mason
- William A. Carroll as Burton Rogers
- Bert Woodruff as Uncle Chet Jenkins
- Jennie Lee as Aunt Martha Jenkins
- Walter Perkins as E.J. Burroughs
- Walter Hiers as Salesman
- Frederick Moore as Salesman
