= Victor Schertzinger =

American composer, director, film producer, and screenwriter

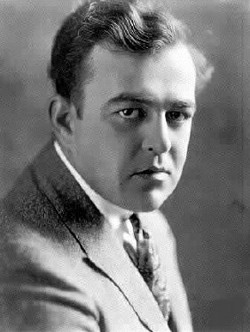
- Born: April 8, 1888; Mahanoy City, Pennsylvania, U.S.
- Died: October 26, 1941 (aged 53); Hollywood, California, U.S.
- Occupations: Violinist; conductor; composer; songwriter; film director; film producer; screenwriter
- Spouse: Julia E. Nicklin
- Children: 2

Victor L. Schertzinger (April 8, 1888 – October 26, 1941) was an American composer, film director, film producer, and screenwriter. His films include Paramount on Parade (co-director, 1930), Something to Sing About (1937) with James Cagney, and the first two "Road" pictures Road to Singapore (1940) and Road to Zanzibar (1941). His two best-known songs are "I Remember You" and "Tangerine", both with lyrics by Johnny Mercer and both featured in Schertzinger's final film, The Fleet's In (1942).

== Life and career ==
Schertzinger was born in Mahanoy City, Pennsylvania, the child of musical parents of Pennsylvania Dutch descent, and attracted attention as a violin prodigy at the age of four.

As a child of eight, he appeared as a violinist with several orchestras, including the Victor Herbert Orchestra and the John Philip Sousa band. In his teens, he attended the Brown Preparatory School in Philadelphia, and gave violin performances while touring America and Europe.

Schertzinger studied music at the University of Brussels. He continued to distinguish himself as a concert violinist, and then as a symphony conductor. He also worked as a songwriter, adding three songs with lyrics by producer Oliver Morosco to L. Frank Baum and Louis F. Gottschalk's musical, The Tik-Tok Man of Oz (1914).

January 5, 1917 Los Angeles Evening Express ad for world premiere of The Play of Everyman with music by Schertzinger

His first brush with the film industry came in 1916, when Thomas Ince commissioned him to compose the orchestral accompaniment for his silent film Civilization. Remaining under Ince's employment, Schertzinger became principal director of the Charles Ray films, establishing a rapport with Ray that few of the star's other collaborators would ever achieve.

After the introduction of sound, Schertzinger continued to direct films but also began to compose songs for them, and in some instances writing scripts or producing as well. Although closely associated with Paramount Pictures, Schertzinger actually spent the 1930s as a freelancer.

Some of his best films, such as One Night of Love (1934) and The Mikado (1939) exploited his knowledge of the world of music. His songwriting collaborators during this period also included Gus Kahn, Johnny Burke and Frank Loesser.

Schertzinger married Julia E. Nicklin, to whom he remained married until his death. They had two daughters, Patricia and Paula.

== Death and Legacy ==
Schertzinger died unexpectedly from a heart attack in Hollywood at the age of 53, having just finished work on The Fleet's In (1942). He had directed 89 films, and had composed music for more than 50 films.

The Hollywood Walk of Fame contains a star for Schertzinger at 1611 Vine Street.

In his home town of Mahanoy City, an official marker from the Pennsylvania Historical and Museum Commission indicates the location of the Schertzinger homestead and jewelry store where Schertzinger grew up. The marker reads:

Violin prodigy who performed with John Philip Sousa and later became a film director and composer. He pioneered the use of original film music for films, and his film 'One Night of Love' won best musical score and sound recording Oscars in 1934. He composed the pop standard 'Tangerine.' Among many films he directed were two of the Hope and Crosby 'Road' movies. He was awarded a star on the Hollywood Walk of Fame. His childhood home was here.

Schertzinger's two best-known songs, "I Remember You" and "Tangerine", continue to appear in the soundtracks of new films.

Schertzinger also appears as a recurring character in Victor Triola's ongoing Epic Short Story series in Book 10, titled "The Organ of Love".

== Filmography ==
The following information comes from the Internet Movie Database. All listed films were directed by Schertzinger, unless otherwise noted.

- The Conqueror (1916) (composer only)
- Civilization (1916) (composer only)
- The Pinch Hitter (1917)
- The Millionaire Vagrant (1917)
- The Clodhopper (1917)
- Sudden Jim (1917)
- The Son of His Father (1917)
- His Mother's Boy (1917)
- The Hired Man (1918)
- The Family Skeleton (1918)
- Playing the Game (1918)
- His Own Home Town (1918)
- The Claws of the Hun (1918)
- A Nine O'Clock Town (1918) (also story)
- Coals of Fire (1918)
- Quicksand (1918)
- String Beans (1918)
- Hard Boiled (1919)
- Extravagance (1919)
- The Sheriff's Son (1919)
- The Homebreaker (1919)
- The Lady of Red Butte (1919)
- When Doctors Disagree (1919)
- Other Men's Wives (1919)
- Upstairs (1919)
- The Peace of Roaring River (1919) (unconfirmed)
- Jinx (1919) with Mabel Normand
- Pinto (1920) (also writer)
- The Blooming Angel (1920)
- The Slim Princess (1920)
- What Happened to Rosa (1920)
- The Concert (1921)
- Made in Heaven (1921)
- Beating the Game (1921)
- Head Over Heels (1922)
- The Bootlegger's Daughter (1922)
- Mr. Barnes of New York (1922)
- The Kingdom Within (1922)
- Dollar Devils (1923)
- Refuge (1923)
- The Lonely Road (1923)
- The Man Next Door (1923)
- The Scarlet Lily (1923)
- Long Live the King (1923)
- The Man Life Passed By (1923) (also writer)
- Chastity (1923)
- A Boy of Flanders (1924)
- Bread (1924)
- Flaming Love (1925)
- Man and Maid (1925)

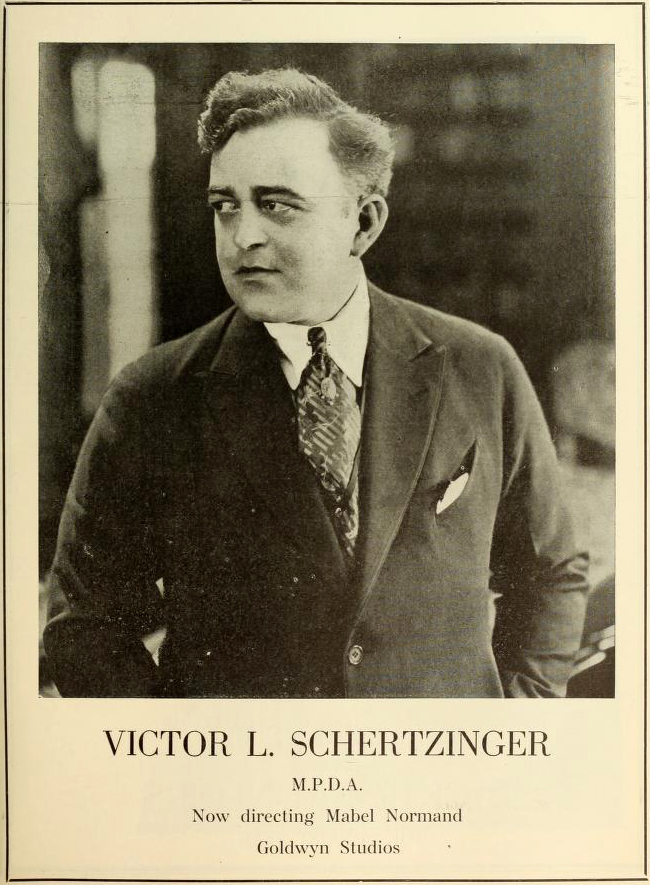
Advertisement (1919)

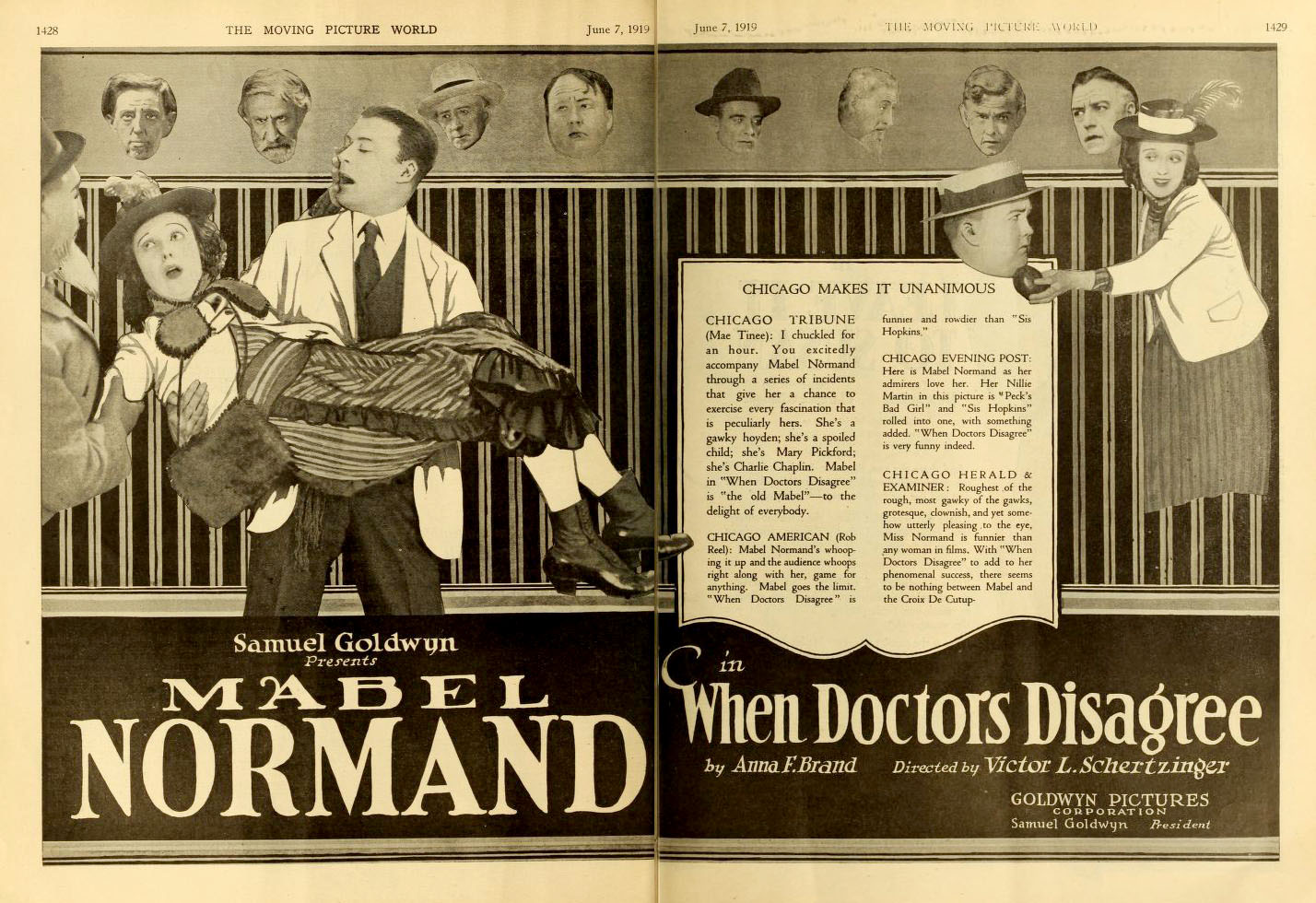
When Doctors Disagree, 1919

- The Wheel (1925)
- Thunder Mountain (1925)
- The Golden Strain (1925)
- Siberia (1926)
- The Lily (1926)
- The Return of Peter Grimm (1926)
- Stage Madness (1927)
- The Heart of Salome (1927)
- The Secret Studio (1927)
- The Showdown (1928)
- Forgotten Faces (1928)
- Outcast (1928) (composer only)
- Redskin (1929)
- Nothing But the Truth (1929)
- The Wheel of Life (1929)
- Fashions in Love (1929) (also composer)
- The Laughing Lady (1929)
- The Love Parade (1929) (composer only)
- Betrayal (1929) (story only)
- The Climax (1930) (composer only)
- Shadow of the Law (1930) (composer only, uncredited)
- Paramount on Parade (1930) (co-directed)
- Safety in Numbers (1930)
- Heads Up (1930) (also composer)
- The Woman Between (1931)
- Caught Plastered (1931) (composer only)
- Friends and Lovers (1931) (also composer)
- Strange Justice (1932) (also composer)
- Uptown New York (1932)
- The Constant Woman (1933) (also producer)
- Cocktail Hour (1933) (also producer)
- My Woman (1933) (also composer)
- Beloved (1934) (also composer)
- One Night of Love (1934) (Academy Award nomination for Best Direction)
- Let's Live Tonight (1935)
- Love Me Forever (1935) (also writer, composer)
- The Lone Wolf Returns (1935) (composer only, uncredited)
- The Return of Peter Grimm (1935) (uncredited)
- Don't Gamble with Love (1936) (composer only)
- The Music Goes 'Round (1936) (also composer)
- You May Be Next (1936) (composer only, uncredited)
- Devil's Playground (1937) (composer only, uncredited)
- Something to Sing About (1937) (also writer, producer, composer)
- The Mikado (1939)
- Road to Singapore (1940)
- Rhythm on the River (1940) (also composer)
- Road to Zanzibar (1941)
- Kiss the Boys Goodbye (1941)
- Birth of the Blues (1941)
- The Fleet's In (1942)

== Discography ==
Unless otherwise noted, the following information comes from the Internet Movie Database.

- "Marcheta" (1913)
- "My Wonderful Dream Girl" (1913) (lyrics by Oliver Morosco from L. Frank Baum's The Tik-Tok Man of Oz)
- "There's a Mate in this Big World for You" (1913) (lyrics by Oliver Morosco from L. Frank Baum's The Tik-Tok Man of Oz)
- "Oh! Take Me" (1913) (lyrics by Oliver Morosco from L. Frank Baum's The Tik-Tok Man of Oz)
- "Another Kiss" (1927)
- "Gotta Be Good" (1928)
- "Dream Lover" (1929) (lyrics by Clifford Grey)
- "Paris Stay the Same" (1929) (lyrics by Clifford Grey)
- "Delphine" (1929) (lyrics by Leo Robin)
- "I Still Believe In You" (1929) (lyrics by Leo Robin)
- "You're My Melody of Love" (1931)
- "I'm That Way About You" (1931)
- "Close to Me" (1931)
- "Listen Heart of Mine" (1933)
- "One Night of Love" (1934) (lyrics by Gus Kahn)
- "Love Me Forever" (1934) (lyrics by Gus Kahn)
- "Right or Wrong" (1937)
- "Out of the Blue" (1937)
- "Any Old Love" (1937)
- "Loving You" (1937)
- "I Don't Want to Cry Anymore" (1940)
- "Captain Custard" (1940) (lyrics by Johnny Burke)
- "(The Moon and the) Willow Tree" (1940) (lyrics by Johnny Burke)
- "I Don't Cry Anymore" (1940) (lyrics by Johnny Burke)
- "I'll Never Let a Day Pass By" (1941) (with Frank Loesser)
- "Kiss the Boys Goodbye" (1941) (with Frank Loesser)
- "Sand in My Shoes" (1941) (with Frank Loesser)
- "Find Yourself a Melody" (1941) (with Frank Loesser)
- "My Start" (1941) (with Frank Loesser)
- "I Remember You" (1941) (lyrics by Johnny Mercer)
- "Tangerine" (1941) (lyrics by Johnny Mercer)
- "Arthur Murray Taught Me Dancing in a Hurry" (1941) (lyrics by Johnny Mercer)
- "Not Mine" (1941) (lyrics by Johnny Mercer)
- "The Fleet's In" (1941) (lyrics by Johnny Mercer)
- "When You Hear The Time Signal" (1941) (lyrics by Johnny Mercer)
- "If You Build A Better Mousetrap" (1941) (lyrics by Johnny Mercer)

== See also ==
- The Play of Everyman
