= Crooked Straight =

1919 film by Jerome Storm

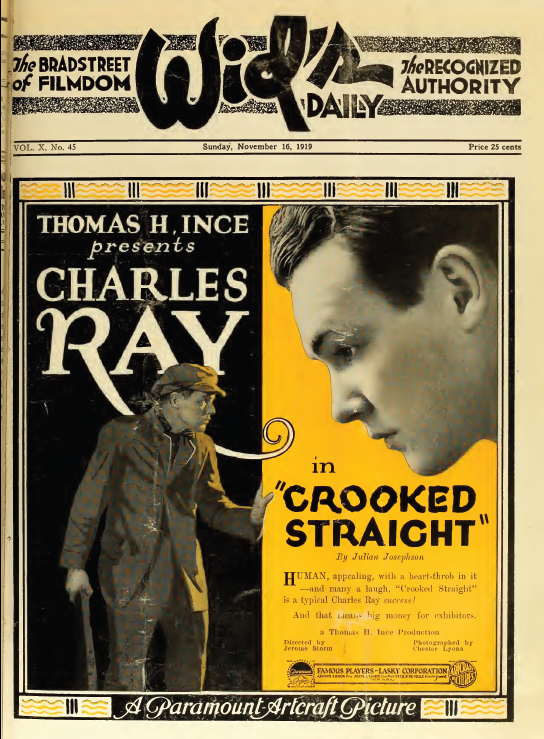
- Advertisement for film
- Directed by: Jerome Storm
- Screenplay by: Julien Josephson
- Produced by: Thomas H. Ince
- Starring: Charles Ray; Wade Boteler; Margery Wilson; Gordon Mullen; Otto Hoffman
- Cinematography: Chester A. Lyons
- Production companies: Thomas H. Ince Corporation; Famous Players–Lasky Corporation
- Distributed by: Paramount Pictures
- Release date: November 9, 1919
- Running time: 50 minutes
- Country: United States
- Language: Silent (English intertitles)

Crooked Straight is a 1919 American silent drama film directed by Jerome Storm and written by Julien Josephson. The film stars Charles Ray, Wade Boteler, Margery Wilson, Gordon Mullen, and Otto Hoffman. The film was released on November 9, 1919, by Paramount Pictures. It is not known whether the film currently survives.

== Plot ==
“A youth comes to the city and is the victim of crooks. He is left by them penniless and discouraged. Driven to desperation, he becomes a safe-cracker himself, but in the end, of course, returns to honest living and marries the heroine.”

== Cast ==
- Charles Ray as Ben Trimble
- Wade Boteler as Spark Nelson
- Margery Wilson as Vera Owen
- Gordon Mullen as Chick Larrabee
- Otto Hoffman as Lucius Owen
