= Red Hot Dollars =

1919 film by Jerome Storm

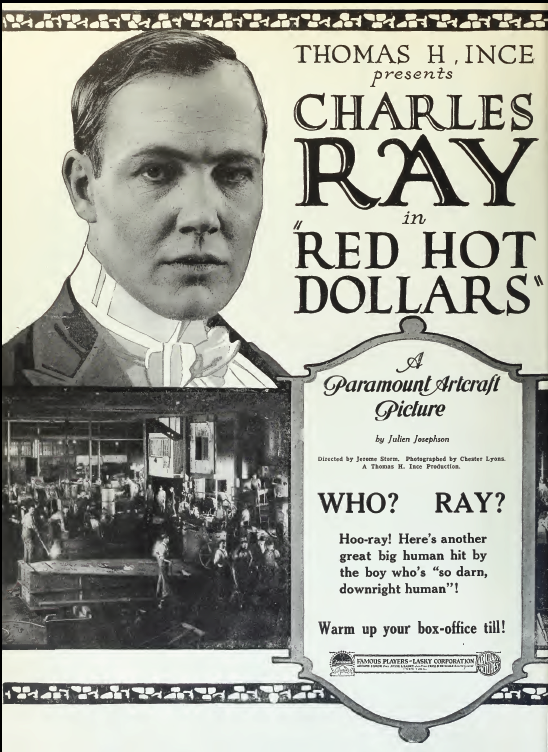
- Advertisement for film
- Directed by: Jerome Storm
- Screenplay by: Julien Josephson
- Produced by: Thomas H. Ince
- Starring: Charles Ray; Gladys George; Charles Hill Mailes; William Conklin; Mollie McConnell
- Cinematography: Chester A. Lyons
- Production companies: Thomas H. Ince Corporation; Famous Players–Lasky Corporation
- Distributed by: Paramount Pictures
- Release date: December 28, 1919
- Running time: 50 minutes
- Country: United States
- Language: Silent (English intertitles)

Red Hot Dollars is a 1919 American silent drama film directed by Jerome Storm and written by Julien Josephson. The film stars Charles Ray, Gladys George, Charles Hill Mailes, William Conklin, and Mollie McConnell. The film was released on December 28, 1919, by Paramount Pictures. A copy of the film is in the Gosfilmofond archive in Moscow.

== Plot ==
As described in a film magazine, Tod Burke a laborer in Peter Garton's steel mill, is severely injured while saving the life of his employer. Because he is without a family, Tod is taken to the Garton mansion to recuperate. The steel magnate becomes very attached to Tod and adopts him. As soon as he has regained his health, he rushes to the home of his sweetheart Janet Muir to tell her of his good luck. He is ejected from the home by Angus Muir, Janet's grandfather, who is a bitter enemy of Garton. The feud between Muir and Garton has existed for many years, and had its origin in the unscrupulous dealings by which Muir gained control of Muir's business. Tod continues his work in Garton's offices only because Janet says his career depends upon it. However, he is heartbroken at not being able to see his fiancée. She is sad because of the illness of her grandfather and the straitened circumstances of the family. Tod takes Janet into his office as a stenographer, but warns that she must not disclose her identity or tell her grandfather the truth of her employment. Garton discovers Janet is a Muir and immediately discharges her. Tod becomes angry and leaves with Janet. The grandfather learns of Janet's firing and goes to the Garton mansion for revenge. Janet and Tod go after him and arrive in time to effect a reconciliation between Muir and Garton.

== Cast ==
- Charles Ray as Tod Burke
- Gladys George as Janet Muir
- Charles Hill Mailes as Angus Muir
- William Conklin as Peter Garton
- Mollie McConnell as Cornelia Garton
