= Hay Foot, Straw Foot =

1919 film by Jerome Storm

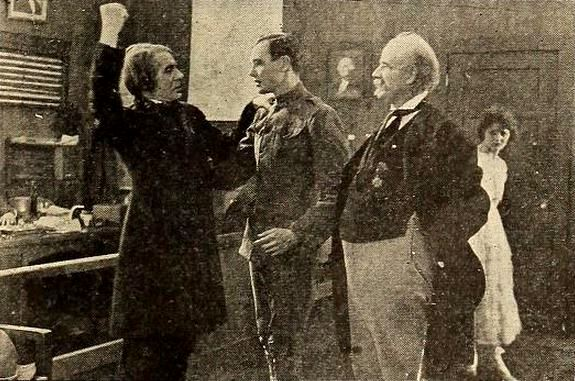
- Still with Spottiswoode Aitken, Charles Ray, J. P. Lockney, and Doris May
- Directed by: Jerome Storm
- Screenplay by: Julien Josephson
- Produced by: Thomas H. Ince
- Starring: Charles Ray; Doris May; William Conklin; Spottiswoode Aitken; J. P. Lockney
- Cinematography: Chester A. Lyons
- Edited by: Ralph Dixon
- Production company: Thomas H. Ince Corporation
- Distributed by: Paramount Pictures
- Release date: June 22, 1919
- Running time: 50 minutes
- Country: United States
- Language: Silent (English intertitles)

Hay Foot, Straw Foot is a 1919 American silent comedy film directed by Jerome Storm and written by Julien Josephson. The film stars Charles Ray, Doris May, William Conklin, Spottiswoode Aitken and J. P. Lockney. The film was released on June 22, 1919, by Paramount Pictures. It is not known whether the film currently survives.

== Plot ==
As described in a film magazine, enlistee Ulysses S. Grant Briggs is bound by his father Thaddeus Briggs, a veteran of the Civil War, to emulate his illustrious namesake in all things. He is charged in a court-martial for entering a notorious roadhouse against orders and rescuing Betty Martin, a young woman who aspires to the stage and had just taken part in a military camp entertainment, from the wiles of a man posing as a vaudeville agent. His father appears at the camp hearing and insists that his boy must have had a good reason for his action, but his son refuses to speak. Betty considers the disgrace she caused to the young man, comes to the camp and tells her story and secures his acquittal.

== Cast ==
- Charles Ray as Ulysses S. Grant Briggs
- Doris May as Betty Martin
- William Conklin as Harry Weller
- Spottiswoode Aitken as Thaddeus Briggs
- J. P. Lockney as Jeff Hanan

== Reception ==
The Variety review was mostly positive, finding the story to be "slight" but that the acting more than made up for it. Great praise was given to Doris May, who the reviewer described as "a mighty clever little ingenue" and "enacts her role charmingly.

== See also ==
- List of films and television shows about the American Civil War
