= Playing the Game =

1918 American short comedy film

- Directed by: Victor Schertzinger
- Screenplay by: Julien Josephson (story); R. Cecil Smith (scenario)
- Produced by: Thomas H. Ince
- Starring: Charles Ray; Doris May; Harry L. Rattenberry; Robert McKim; William Elmer; Leota Lorraine
- Cinematography: Chester A. Lyons
- Production company: Thomas H. Ince Corporation
- Distributed by: Paramount Pictures
- Release date: May 5, 1918
- Running time: 50 minutes
- Country: United States
- Language: Silent (English intertitles)

Playing the Game is a 1918 American silent comedy drama film directed by Victor Schertzinger and written by Julien Josephson and R. Cecil Smith. The film stars Charles Ray, Doris May, Harry L. Rattenberry, Robert McKim, William Elmer, and Leota Lorraine. The film was released on May 5, 1918, by Paramount Pictures. It is not known whether the film currently survives, and it may be a lost film.

== Plot ==
As described in a film magazine, believing that killed a professional dancer in a cafe brawl, Larry Prentiss along with his valet Hodges flee to the west to where he owns a ranch. The two are waylaid, robbed of their clothes, and set adrift. In this condition they are picked up by the foreman of Larry's ranch, Flash Purdy. Larry, wanting to make good on his merits, refuses to make known his identity. Hardships follow in which Larry incurs the enmity of Flash Purdy. Larry later saves the ranch payroll during a running gun fight and in the midst of a hand-to-hand struggle learns that Moya Shannon, daughter of the ranch manager, loves him. In the days that follow he squares his account with Purdy, but his adventure comes to a close when his identity becomes known after he receives a telegram from his uncle.

== Cast ==
- Charles Ray as Larry Prentiss
- Doris May as Moya Shannon
- Harry L. Rattenberry as Matt Shannon
- Robert McKim as 'Flash' Jim Purdy
- William Elmer as Hodges
- Leota Lorraine as 'Babe' Fleur de Lis
- Charles Perley as Hickey Trent
- Melbourne MacDowell as Jeremiah Prentiss

== Reception ==
Like many American films of the time, Playing the Game was subject to cuts by city and state film censorship boards. For example, the Chicago Board of Censors cut, in Reel 5, the closeup of foreman holding gun against Mexican's heart.
