= Greased Lightning (1919 film) =

1919 film by Jerome Storm

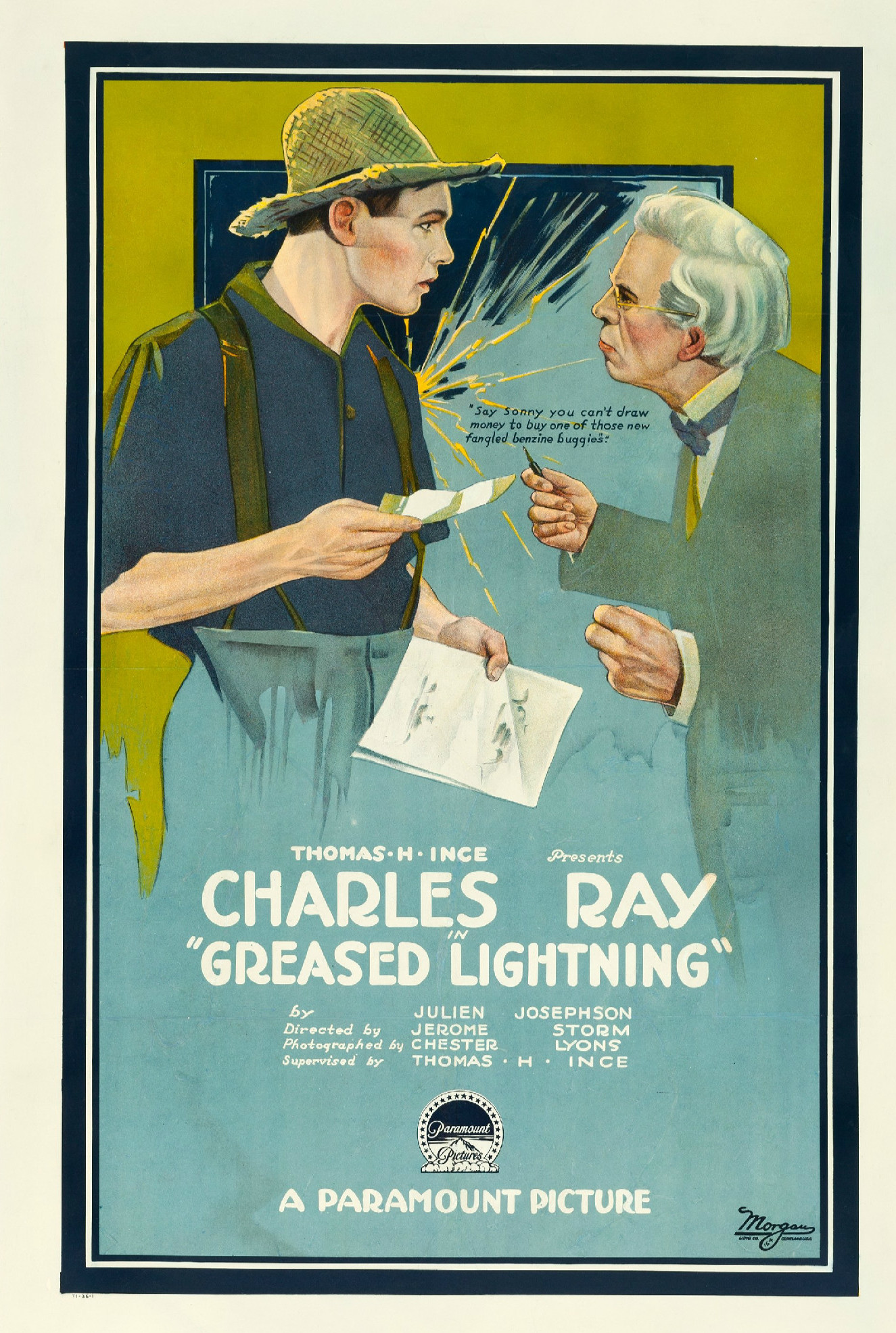
- Directed by: Jerome Storm
- Screenplay by: Julien Josephson
- Produced by: Thomas H. Ince
- Starring: Charles Ray; Wanda Hawley; Robert McKim; Willis Marks; Bert Woodruff; J. P. Lockney
- Cinematography: Chester A. Lyons
- Production company: Thomas H. Ince Corporation
- Distributed by: Paramount Pictures
- Release date: April 27, 1919
- Running time: 50 minutes
- Country: United States
- Language: Silent (English intertitles)

Greased Lightning is a surviving 1919 American silent comedy film directed by Jerome Storm and written by Julien Josephson. The film stars Charles Ray, Wanda Hawley, Robert McKim, Willis Marks, Bert Woodruff, and J. P. Lockney. The film was released on April 27, 1919, by Paramount Pictures.

== Plot ==
As described in a film magazine, village blacksmith Andy Fletcher is about to purchase a new car when Laban Flint, the town banker, warns him to stay clear of his daughter Alice with the vehicle. Since Alice was the cause of Andy's desire in making the purchase, he is dissuaded. But a lucky trade brings a motored relic into his possession and Flint is pacified. During a drive into the country with Alice and her father, the car breaks down and an estrangement ensues when Alice departs in the elegant machine of Alden J. Armitage, a wealthy investor recently come to Piperville. Some time later Armitage arranges an automobile race and Andy enters his chassis. While the race is on, Armitage robs the bank and flees. Andy pursues in his car and captures the robber.

== Cast ==
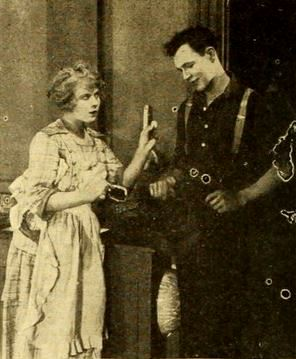
Still with Charles Ray and Wanda Hawley

- Charles Ray as Andy Fletcher
- Wanda Hawley as Alice Flint
- Robert McKim as Alden J. Armitage
- Willis Marks as Laban Flint
- Bert Woodruff as Grandpa Piper
- J. P. Lockney as Milt Barlow
- Otto Hoffman as Rufus Shadd

== Preservation status ==
A print survives in the Gosfilmofond, Russian film archive.
