= Mountain Dew (film) =

- Directed by: Thomas N. Heffron
- Written by: Julien Josephson; Monte M. Katterjohn
- Produced by: Triangle Film Corporation
- Starring: Margery Wilson
- Cinematography: Charles Stumar
- Distributed by: Triangle Film Corporation
- Release date: September 16, 1917
- Running time: 5 reels
- Country: United States
- Language: Silent (English intertitles)

Mountain Dew is a lost 1917 American silent comedy-drama film directed by Thomas N. Heffron and starring Margery Wilson. It was produced and distributed by the Triangle Film Corporation.

== Plot ==
As described in a film magazine, J. Hamilton Vance (Gunn) goes to the mountains to find new material for a novel. He becomes a school teacher and becomes infatuated with Roxie Bradley (Wilson), the daughter of Squire Bradley (Filson), who does not approve of his daughter's learning. Vance is successful in teaching the girl to read and write and, although he is suspected of being a revenue agent, he manages to make a few friendships. However, a stray piece of paper upon which he has begun his novel flies away and is picked up by some of the moonshiners, who then attack him. He marries Roxie and by promising to become a partner in their distillery of illicit liquor, he is allowed to continue on his way unharmed.

== Cast ==
- Margery Wilson - Roxie Bradley
- Charles Gunn - J. Hamilton Vance
- Thomas Washington - Roosevelt Washington
- Al W. Filson - Squire Bradley
- Jack Richardson - Milt Sears
- Aaron Edwards - Lafe Grider
- Mary Boland - Lily Bud Rainer

== Reception ==
Like many American films of the time, Mountain Dew was subject to cuts by city and state film censorship boards. The Chicago Board of Censors cut a scene with a boy shooting Sears and three racist subtitles, "Do you care so much for education that you'll see a nigger hold a gun to your pap?", "Get the men together at the still and we'll get him and his nigger tonight", and "I'se a white nigger from Chicago".
