= Julien Josephson =

American screenwriter

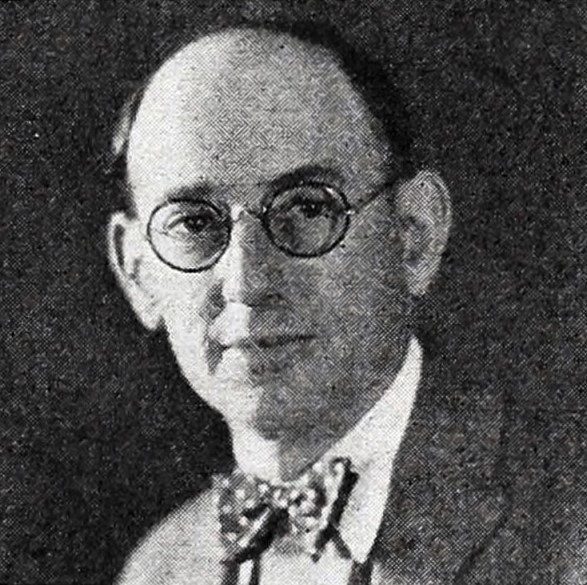
From a 1925 magazine

Julien Josephson (October 24, 1881 – April 14, 1959) was an American motion picture screenwriter. His career spanned between 1914 and 1943. He was a native of Roseburg, Oregon.

== Career ==
Josephson was well known for his early silent movie adaptions of theatrical works such as Oscar Wilde's Lady Windermere's Fan (1925) and Mary Roberts Rinehart and Avery Hopwood's The Bat (1926). He was nominated for an Academy Award for his work on George Arliss' Disraeli (1929). He later wrote or co-wrote many popular films, including the Shirley Temple vehicles Heidi and Wee Willie Winkie (both 1937), Suez (1938) and Stanley and Livingstone (1939).

== Partial filmography ==
- Mountain Dew (1917)
- Playing the Game (1918)
- The Biggest Show on Earth (1918)
- Fuss and Feathers (1918)
- String Beans (1918)
- Greased Lightning (1919)
- Hay Foot, Straw Foot (1919)
- Bill Henry (1919)
- The Egg Crate Wallop (1919)
- Crooked Straight (1919)
- Red Hot Dollars (1919)
- Paris Green (1920)
- Homespun Folks (1920)
- The Jailbird (1920)
- Dangerous Curve Ahead (1921)
- Watch Your Step (1922)
- Extra! Extra! (1922)
- Head Over Heels (1922)
- His Back Against the Wall (1922)
- The Man Unconquerable (1922)
- Who Are My Parents? (1922)
- The Cowboy and the Lady (1922)
- Hungry Hearts (1922)
- All the Brothers Were Valiant (1923)
- Brass (1923)
- Main Street (1923)
- Where the North Begins (1923)
- The Printer's Devil (1923)
- The Country Kid (1923)
- Daddies (1924)
- The Narrow Street (1925)
- My Wife and I (1925)
- Rose of the World (1925)
- The Bat (1926)
- It Must Be Love (1926)
- Forever After (1926)
- The Eagle of the Sea (1926)
- The Whirlwind of Youth (1927)
- A Ship Comes In (1928)
- The Red Mark (1928)
- Do Your Duty (1928)
- The Climax (1930)
- The Green Goddess (1930)
- Kiss Me Again (1931)
- Misbehaving Ladies (1931)
- The Millionaire (1931)
- Alexander Hamilton (1931)
- The Man Who Played God (1932)
- The Expert (1932)
- A Successful Calamity (1932)
- Chance at Heaven (1933)
- Wee Willie Winkie (1937)
- Heidi (1937)
- Suez (1938)
- Stanley and Livingstone (1939)
- The Rains Came (1939)
- The Great Gildersleeve (1942)
- Happy Land (1943)
