= Al W. Filson =

American actor (1857–1925)

Al Filson
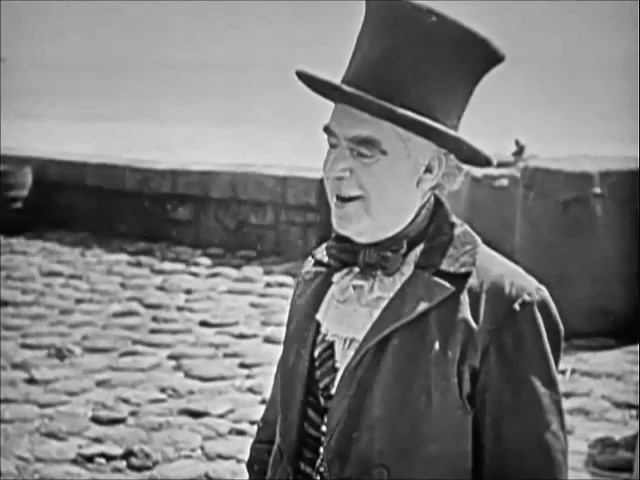
- In the 1922 film Monte Cristo
- Born: Alfred William Filson; January 27, 1857; Indiana, U.S.
- Died: November 14, 1925 (aged 68); Palm Springs, California, U.S.
- Other names: Alford William Filson
- Occupations: Actor of stage and film
- Spouse: Lee Errol (or Lea Errol)

Al W. Filson (January 27, 1857 – November 14, 1925) was an American actor of stage and film, known for his work in vaudeville. Filson toured with the Orpheum and Keith circuits, with a tramp act. He was in several Selig Polyscope Company films.

Filson often performed comedy sketch on stage with his wife, actress Lee Errol (or Lea Errol), under the name Filson and Errol. Filson and Errol performed in "A Daughter of Bacchus" (1905); and in the George M. Cohan stage show skit, "A Tip on the Derby".

He copyrighted Ed Chrissie's musical comedy, "A Dose of His Own Medicine" in 1898.

== Filmography ==
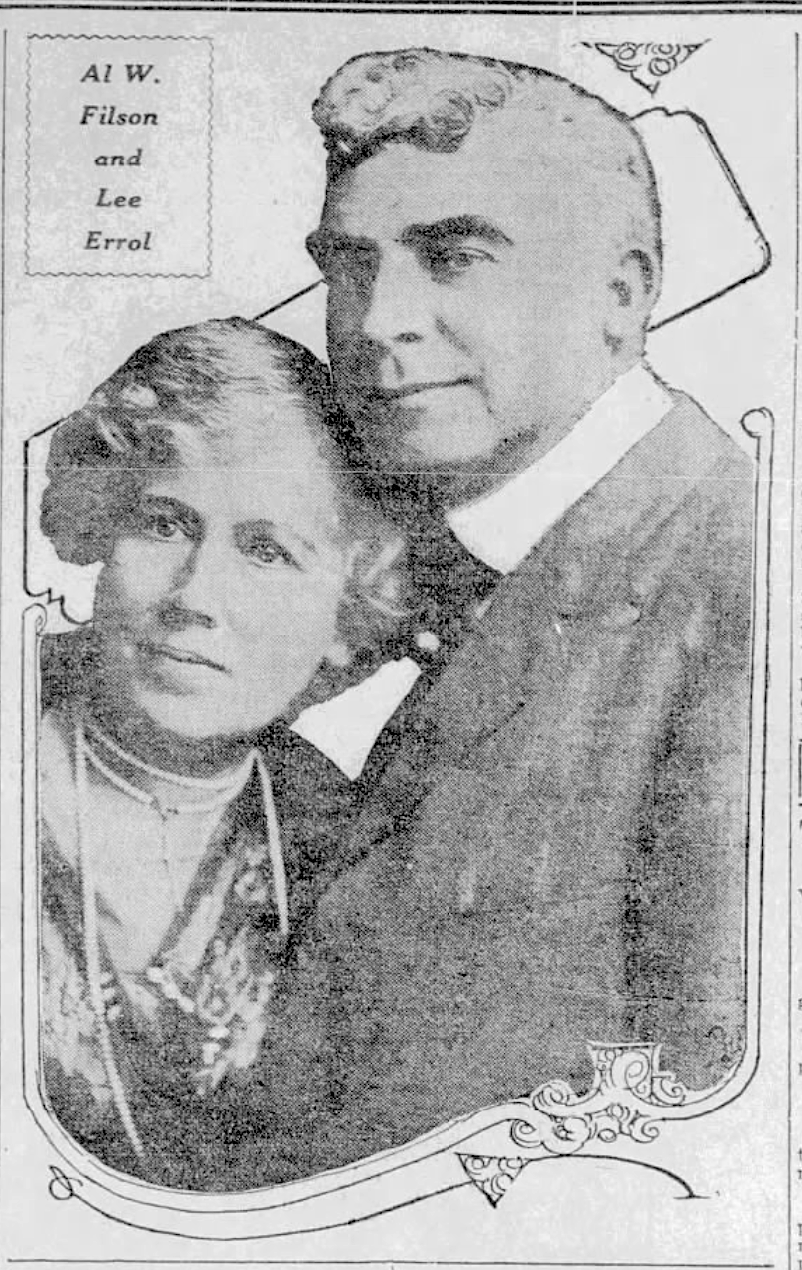
Filson and Errol, 1914

- For Her Father's Sins (1914)
- The Love of Loti San (1915)
- The Eternal Feminine (1915)
- The Tiger Slayer (1915)
- The Print of the Nails (1915)
- Bred in the Bone (1915)
- Eleven-Thirty P.M. / 11:30 P.M. (1915)
- A Yankee from the West (1915)
- The Old Man Who Tried to Grow Young (1916)
- At Piney Ridge (1916)
- Unto Those Who Sin (1916)
- The Cycle of Fate (1916)
- The Garden of Allah (1916)
- The Valiants of Virginia (1916)
- The Scarlet Car (1917)
- The Lad and the Lion (1917), a film adaptation of The Lad and the Lion
- Beware of Strangers (1917)
- Who Shall Take My Life? (1917)
- Mountain Dew (1917)
- Little Lost Sister (1917)
- String Beans (1918)
- Hands Down (1918)
- Widow by Proxy (1919)
- Hairpin (1920)
- Treasure Island (1920)
- Homespun Folks (1920)
- The Girl from God's Country (1921)
- Made in Heaven (1921)
- Chickens (1921)
- Monte Cristo (1922)
- Watch Him Step (1922)
