= Head over Heels (1922 film) =

1922 film by Paul Bern and Victor Schertzinger

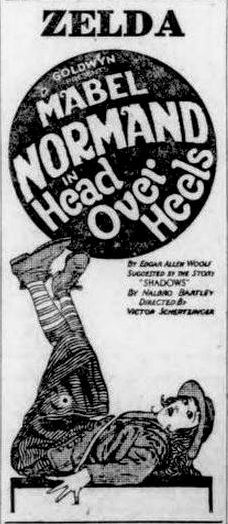
- Newspaper ad
- Directed by: Paul Bern; Victor Schertzinger
- Written by: Nalbro Isadorah Bartley (screen story); Gerald C. Duffy (scenario); Julien Josephson (scenario)
- Produced by: Samuel Goldwyn
- Starring: Mabel Normand; Raymond Hatton; Adolphe Menjou
- Cinematography: George Webber (*as George F. Webber)
- Distributed by: Goldwyn Pictures
- Release date: April 1922
- Running time: 50 minutes
- Country: United States
- Language: Silent (English intertitles)

Head over Heels is a 1922 American comedy film starring Mabel Normand and directed by Paul Bern and Victor Schertzinger. This is a surviving comedy film at the Library of Congress. The supporting cast includes Raymond Hatton and Adolphe Menjou.

== Plot ==
As described in a film magazine, Tina, an Italian acrobat, is engaged by Sterling, a member of a New York City theater company, to come to New York City as a star. She arrives in her native costume and, realizing he has picked a lemon, Sterling asks Lawson, his partner, to get him out of the contract. A press agent learns of the situation and agrees to take over the contract. He arranges to have her meet Al Wilkins, a patent medicine manufacturer, who is also a motion picture magnet. After being dressed up by a beauty specialist, both Wilkins and Lawson crave her favor. She is in love with Lawson, however, and when he receives a business note from another, she almost breaks up his party by jumping into its midst and fighting Lawson's client. In the end, everything is straightened out and there is a "twinkling of wedding bells" finish.

== Cast ==
- Mabel Normand as Tina
- Hugh Thompson as Lawson
- Russ Powell as Papa Bambinetti
- Raymond Hatton as Pepper
- Adolphe Menjou as Sterling
- Lilyan Tashman as Edith Penfield
- Lionel Belmore as Al Wilkins
