= A Nine O'Clock Town =

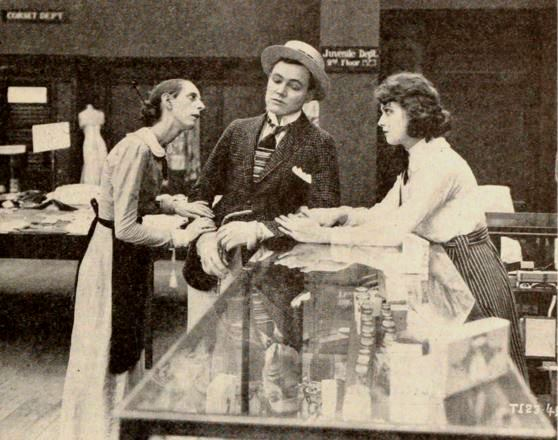
- Film still
- Directed by: Victor Schertzinger
- Screenplay by: Victor Schertzinger
- Produced by: Thomas H. Ince
- Starring: Charles Ray; Jane Novak; Otto Hoffman; Gertrude Claire; Catherine Young; Dorcas Matthews
- Cinematography: Chester A. Lyons
- Production companies: Famous Players–Lasky Corporation; Thomas H. Ince Corporation
- Distributed by: Paramount Pictures
- Release date: July 28, 1918
- Running time: 50 minutes
- Country: United States
- Language: Silent (English intertitles)

A Nine O'Clock Town is a 1918 American comedy silent film written and directed by Victor Schertzinger. The film stars Charles Ray, Jane Novak, Otto Hoffman, Gertrude Claire, Catherine Young, and Dorcas Matthews. The film was released on July 28, 1918, by Paramount Pictures. It is not known whether the film currently survives, and it may be a lost film.

== Plot ==
As described in a film magazine, David Clary has big ideas on how to run a store, but John Clary, his crusty old dad, lets his business run downhill. David goes to the big city and while working as a clerk in a department store absorbs a few more pointers. He is also fleeced by a cabaret habitué (Young). Finally, his father sends for him to rejuvenate the "Emporium." By employing the town band and advertising, he fills the store with customers. The cabaret girl comes to town on the pretext of returning his watch and lures him to her hotel room. Here her fake husband (Ross) blackmails the young manager, but is exposed when he comes to collect $5000 from David by the corset model (Matthews), who swears that he is her husband. Selling out the store to a syndicate for a large sum saves David from bankruptcy and he takes his chief clerk and constant adviser Katherine Farrell (Novak) as his life partner.

== Cast ==
- Charles Ray as David Clary
- Jane Novak as Katherine Farrell
- Otto Hoffman as John Clary
- Gertrude Claire as Mrs. Clary
- Catherine Young as The Dame
- Dorcas Matthews as The Model
- Milton Ross as The Dame's Partner
- Melbourne MacDowell as Mr. Adler
- Caroline Rankin as Saleslady (credited as Caroline 'Spike' Rankin)
