= The Clodhopper =

1917 film by Victor Schertzinger

- Directed by: Victor Schertzinger
- Production company: Kay-Bee Pictures
- Release date: 1917
- Running time: 46 minutes
- Country: United States
- Language: Silent

The Clodhopper is a 1917 American comedy drama film from Kay-Bee Pictures starring Charles Ray and Margery Wilson and directed by Victor Schertzinger.

== Plot ==
The Clodhopper (1917)

Isaac Nelson is the tight-fisted president of a country bank and owns a farm, where his son Everett works long hours every day, even on Sundays. Everett wears his father's cast-off clothes, and after his mother buys him a mail order suit, Everett goes to a Fourth of July picnic with his sweetheart Mary Martin. The father sees his wife in the field doing the son's work and, after forcing his son home from the picnic, beats him. Everett Nelson runs off to the big city (NYC) and tries to apply for a job as a janitor at a theater. There he meets a showman who puts him in a cabaret as a country dancer, doing a bizarre dance that Everett calls the "clodhopper slide," making $200 a week. Back in his hometown, rumors start to spread about the county bank making poor investments, creating a run on Mr. Nelson's bank. Everett's girlfriend, goes to New York to ask him for help and sways him to return home. Everett saves the bank and he and Mary get married.

== Cast ==
- Charles Ray - Everett Nelson
- Charles K. French - Isaac Nelson, Everett's Father
- Margery Wilson - Mary Martin
- Lydia Knott - Mrs. Nelson
- Tom Guise - Karl Seligman

== Reception ==
Like many American films of the time, The Clodhopper was subject to cuts by city and state film censorship boards. The Chicago Board of Censors required one cut of a stamped postcard (the board cut closeups of all envelopes and postcards from films).
