= Wallace Irwin =

American journalist (1875–1959)

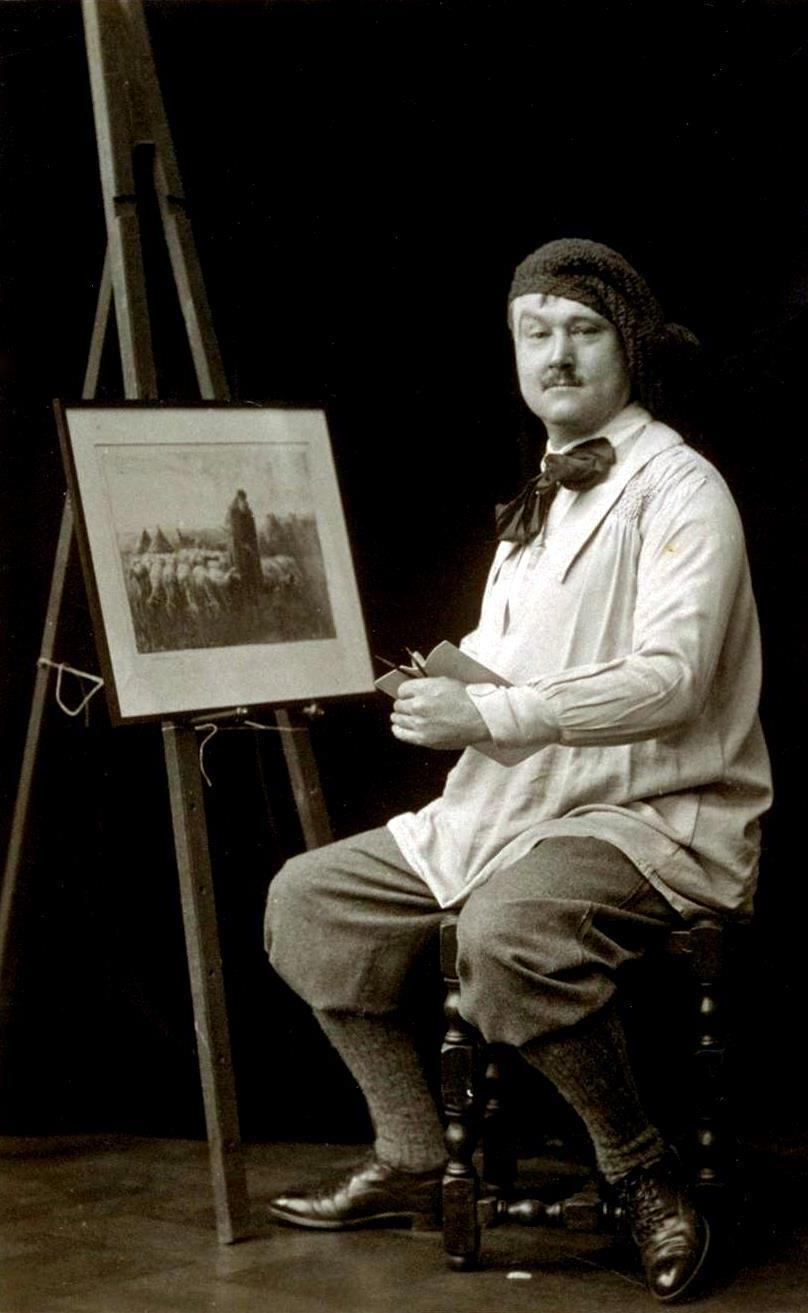
Irwin in London, 1922

Wallace Irwin (March 15, 1875 – February 14, 1959) was an American writer. Over the course of his long career, Irwin wrote humorous sketches, light verse, screenplays, short stories, novels, nautical lays, aphorisms, journalism, political satire, lyrics for Broadway musicals, and the libretto for an opera. His novel The Julius Caesar Murder Case (1935) represents a subgenre within detective fiction, the mystery novel set in antiquity.

== Biography ==
A native of Oneida, New York, Irwin grew up in Colorado and went to California to attend Stanford University. As editor of two campus publications, he lampooned faculty in verse and was expelled, as he later boasted, for having a character that "savored of brimstone". Later he would lampoon collegiate life in his once popular The Shame of the Colleges (1907). He moved to San Francisco and began his career as a journalist for William Randolph Hearst’s Examiner and other papers. With the encouragement of Gelett Burgess, Irwin branched into poetry with The Love Sonnets of a Hoodlum (1901), followed by Nautical Lays of a Landsman (1904), At The Sign of the Dollar (1905), Chinatown Ballads (1906), and The Love Sonnets of a Car Conductor (1908). Between 1913 and 1935, fourteen of his novels or short stories were adapted by himself or others for film.

Irwin often wrote under a pseudonym or presented himself as the editor, translator, or sardonic discoverer of works by others. His Rubaiyat of Omar Khayyam, Jr. purports to be his translation from a language he calls "Mango-Bornese". Irwin's most sustained impersonation began in 1907 with the serialization of his "Letters of a Japanese Schoolboy" in Colliers magazine. He wrote in a stereotypical fractured English in the persona of a thirty-five-year-old "boy" Hashimura Togo. The fourth installment of the series, entitled "Yellow Peril", featured Irwin posed in yellow face make-up for a portrait photograph of Togo. The photo fooled readers for months, whereupon Colliers produced twin photos, Irwin as Togo and Irwin "before he was Japanned". Irwin's racial clichés brought him to the heights of success, including praise from Mark Twain who found Togo a delightful creation and the New York Globe which hailed the book as "the greatest joke in America". Irwin went on to write three more Togo books, and in 1917 Hollywood followed with the silent film comedy Hashimura Togo.

The Togo fad was built upon Irwin's creation of a Japanese caricature at a time when many Americans admired Japan for its recent victory in the Russo-Japanese War, 1904–05. However, after World War I, American opinion shifted as the United States and Japan competed for military and economic advantage in Asia. Irwin's approach likewise turned, resulting in Seed of the Sun with its dire warning that Japanese immigrants represented both the "nefarious alliance of Asiatics and speculative capital" and their emperor's plan for them to "marry Euro-American women in order to promote their race".

Success as a humorist allowed Irwin to devote himself to what he considered his serious work, novels and articles with social and political purpose, writing that is now largely forgotten except when cited by historians as representative of widespread pre-World War II racism.

Irwin was married twice. In 1901 he married Grace Adelaide Luce. Over a year after her death, in January 1916 he married Laetitia McDonald. Wallace and Laetitia had two children. Donald (1917–1991) was a journalist for the New York Herald Tribune and the Los Angeles Times, and served as an aide to Nelson A. Rockefeller during the Eisenhower administration. Wallace Jr. (1919–2010) was a speechwriter for several U.S. congressmen and the future President George H. W. Bush during Bush's time as U.S. ambassador to the United Nations.

Wallace Irwin died in Southern Pines, North Carolina. That same year, 1959, his personal papers, including manuscripts to novels and poems, correspondence, freelance journalism, and an unpublished autobiography, were donated to the Bancroft Library at the University of California, Berkeley.
