= Triangle Film Corporation =

American film studio

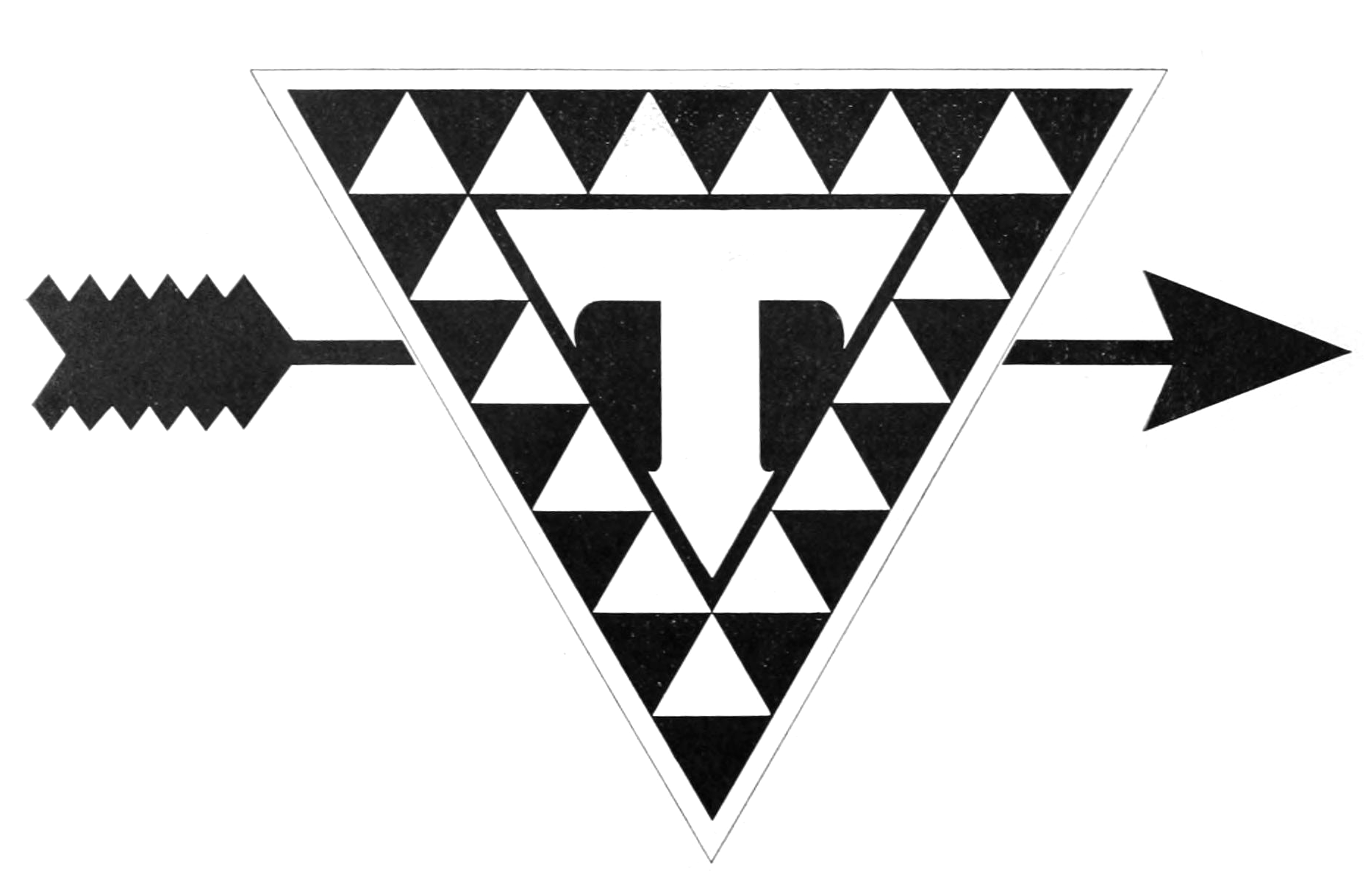

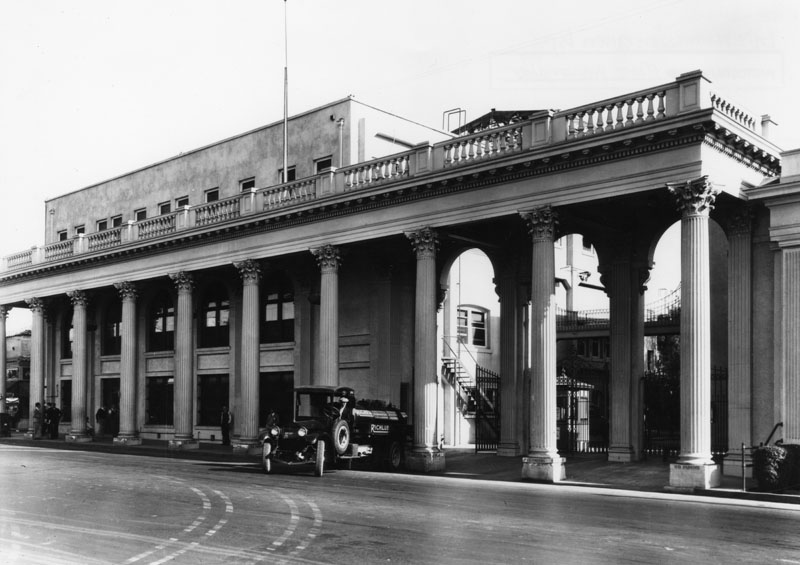
- Triangle Studios, 1916
- Type: Public
- Industry: Film
- Founded: July 1915
- Founder: Harry and Roy Aitken
- Defunct: 1922
- Fate: Absorbed
- Headquarters: 10202 West Washington Boulevard, Culver City, California, United States
- Area served: Worldwide
- Key people: Adolph Zukor (Producer); Filmmakers: D.W. Griffith; Thomas Ince; Mack Sennett

Triangle Film Corporation (also known as Triangle Motion Picture Company) was a major American motion-picture studio, founded in July 1915 in Culver City, California and terminated 7 years later in 1922.

== History ==
The studio was founded in July 1915 by Harry and Roy Aitken, two brothers from the Wisconsin farmlands who pioneered the studio system of Hollywood's Golden Age. Harry was also D. W. Griffith's partner at Reliance-Majestic Studios; both parted with the Mutual Film Corporation in the wake of The Birth of a Nation's unexpected success that year. Triangle was envisioned as a prestige studio based on the producing abilities of filmmakers D. W. Griffith, Thomas Ince and Mack Sennett.

The studio planned to open eight model theaters, but opened only three: the Knickerbocker in New York, the Chestnut Street Opera House in Philadelphia and the Studebaker Theatre in Chicago. They opened in 1915 and were all closed as unviable in 1916.

Eventually, the studio suffered from bloat. By 1917, producer Adolph Zukor had taken control of all of the studio's assets. In June 1917, Thomas H. Ince and Mack Sennett left the company and sold their remaining interests. In 1917, Triangle's distribution network of film exchanges were sold off to the W.W. Hodkinson company for $600,000 (equivalent to $15,000,000 in 2025). Goldwyn Pictures purchased the Triangle Studios in Culver City in 1918.

Triangle continued to produce films until 1919, when it ceased operations. Films using the Triangle name were still released to the general public until 1923.

== Selected filmography ==
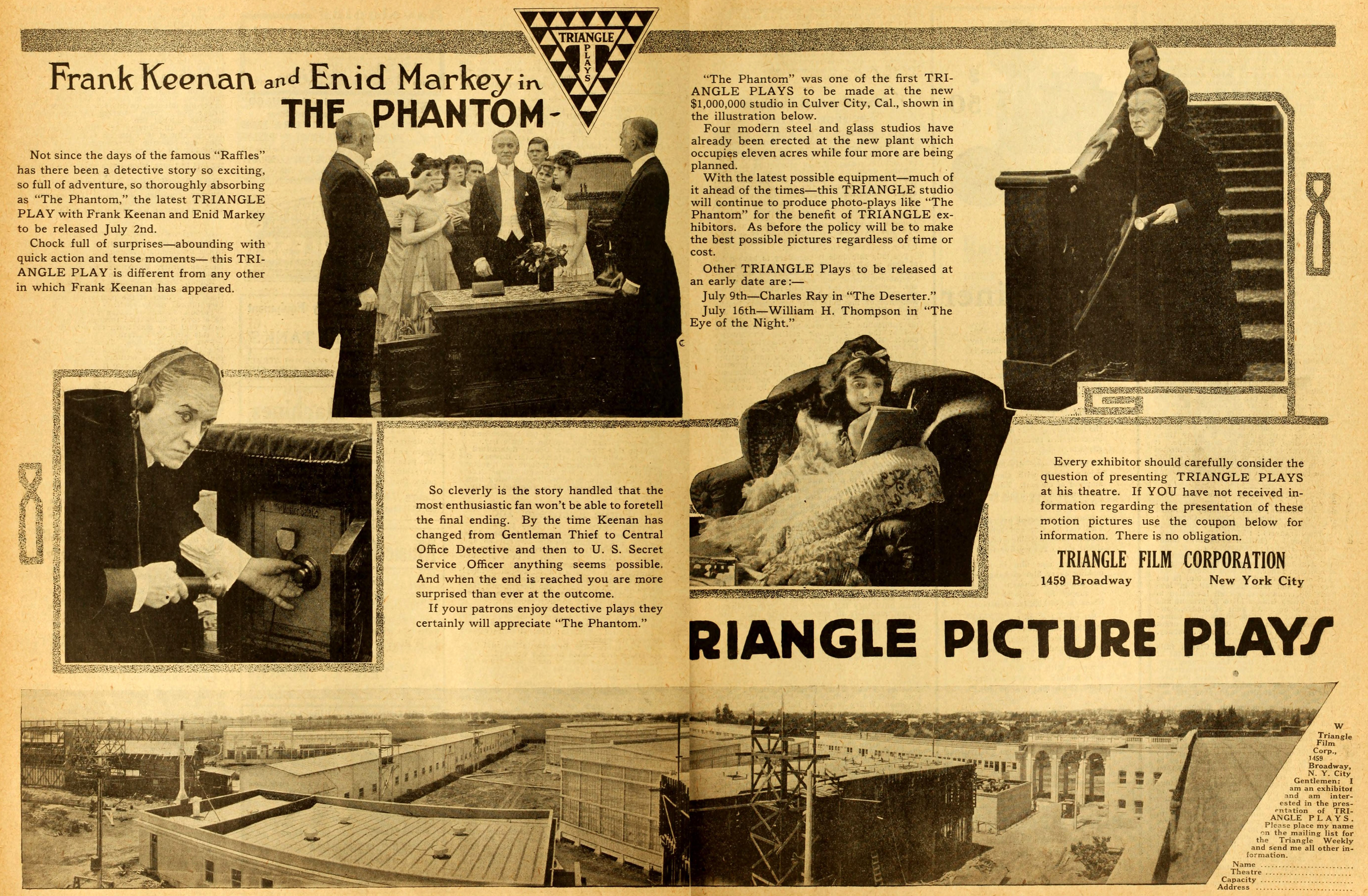
The Phantom (1916)

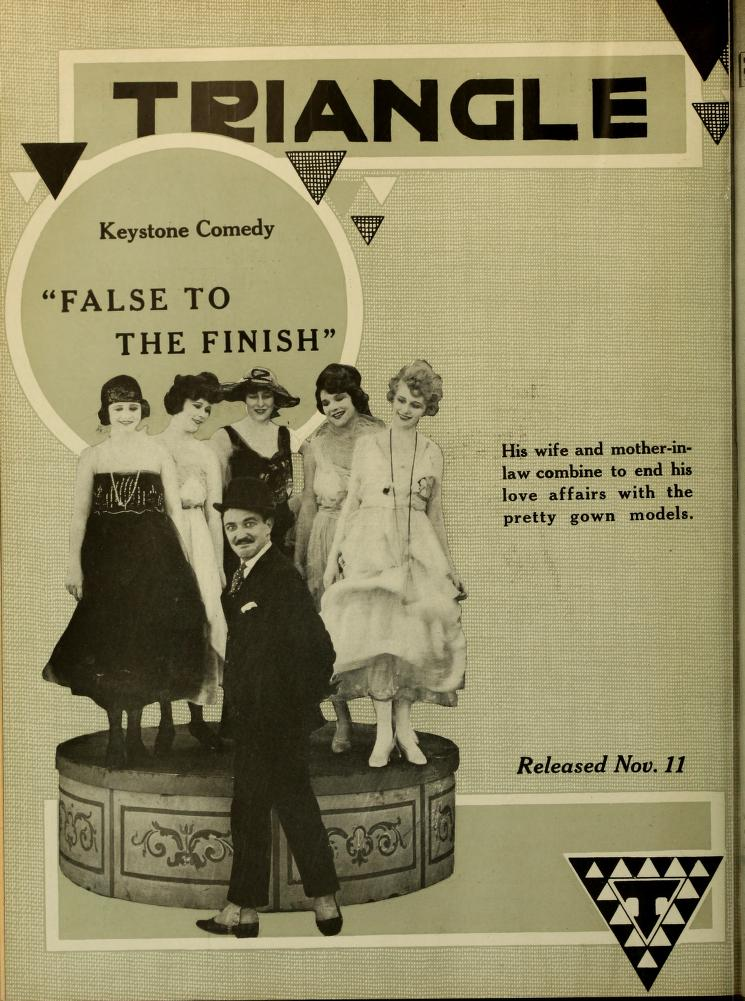
False to the Finish (1917)

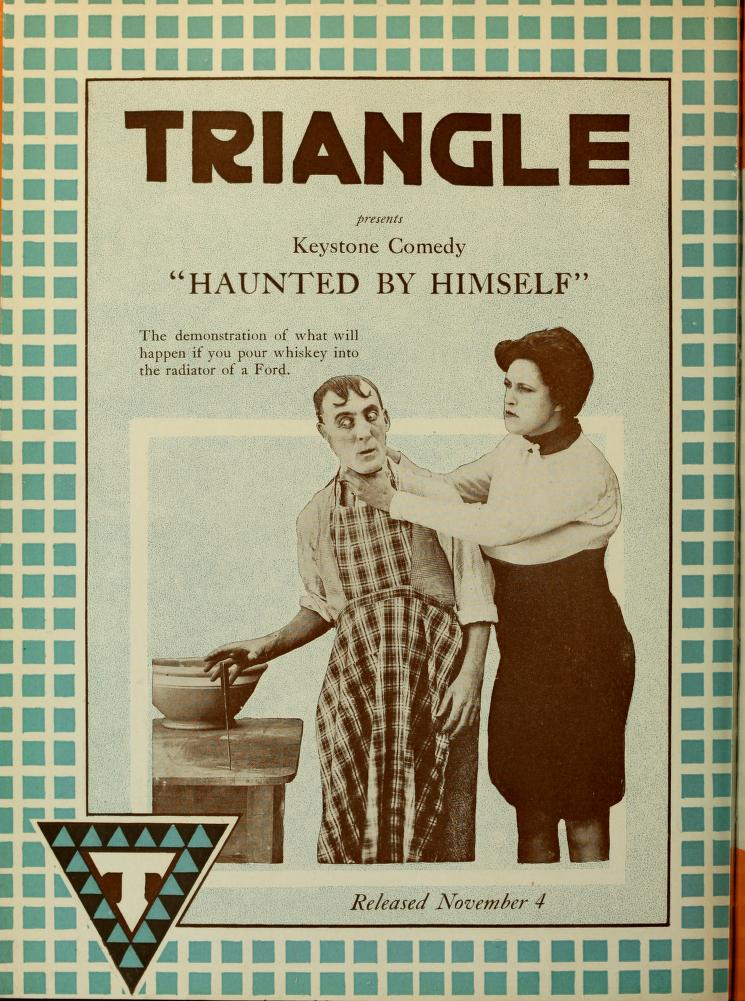
Haunted by Himself (1917)

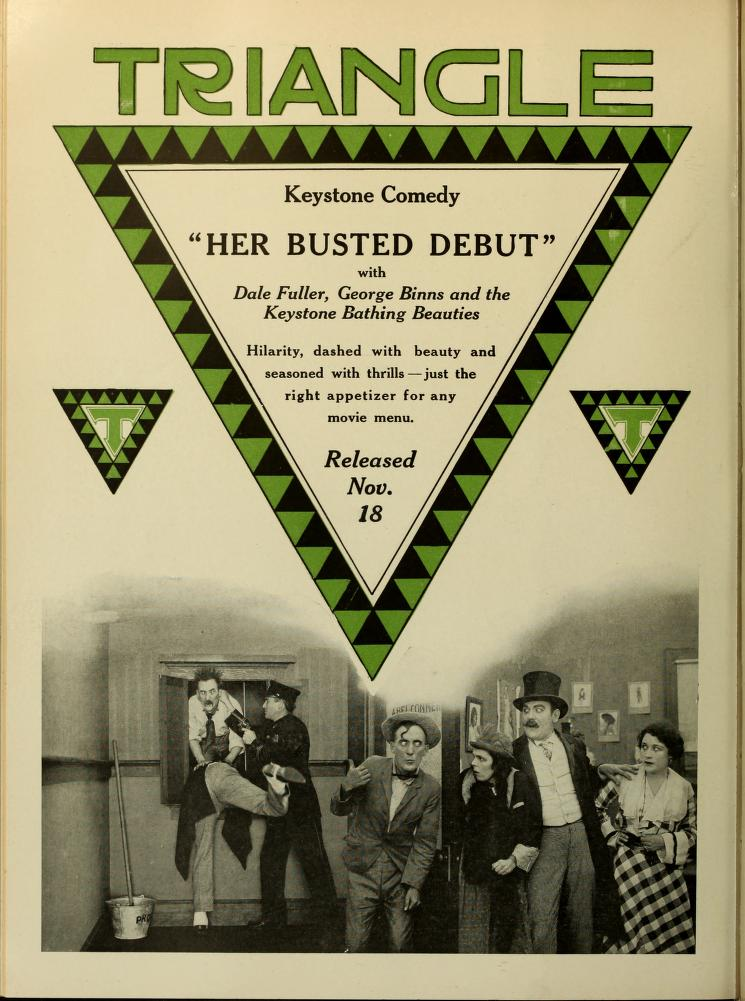
Her Busted Debut (1917)

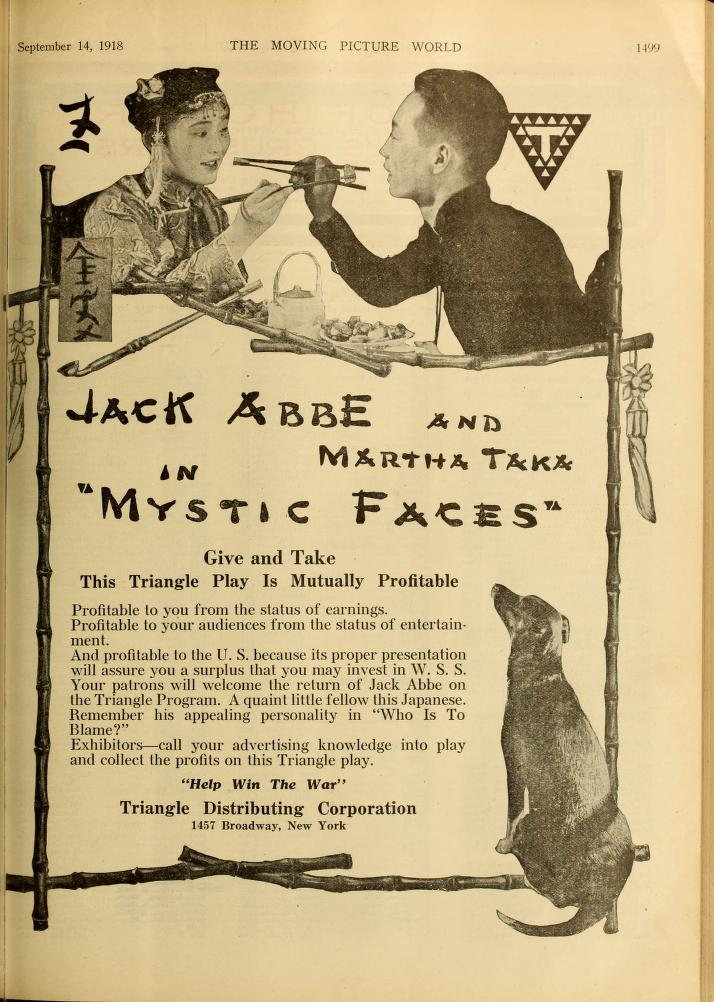
Mystic Faces (1918)

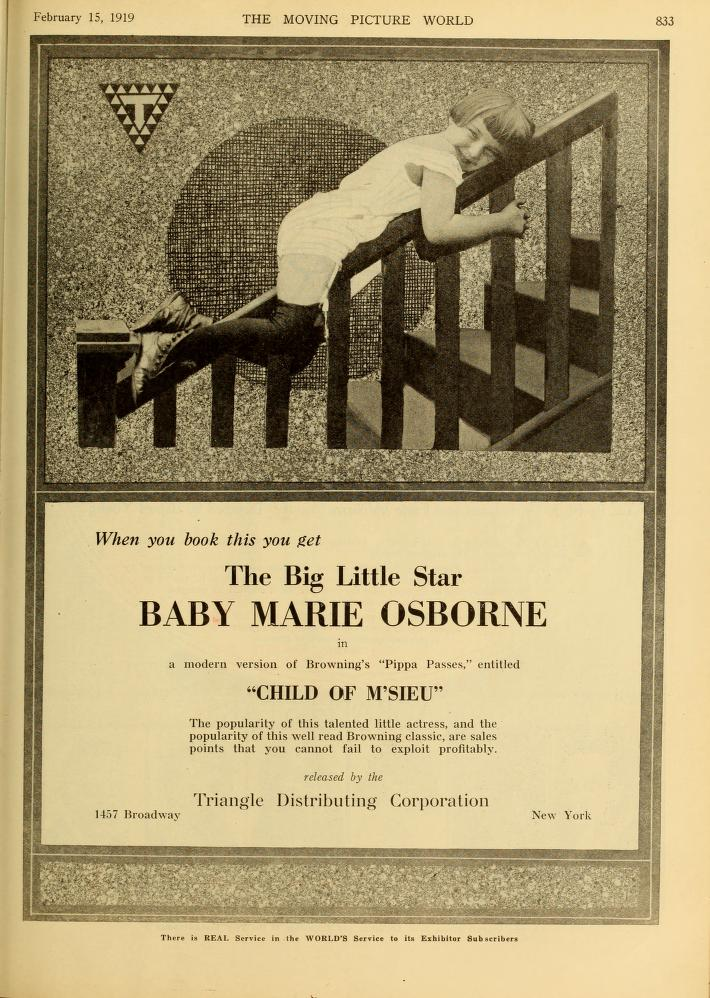
Child of M'sieu (1919)

With the exception of Oh, Mabel Behave (1922), all of Triangle's films were released between 1915 and 1919. Most films were made on the West Coast, but some of Triangle's production took place in Fort Lee, New Jersey.

== Sources ==
- Frederic Lombardi. Allan Dwan and the Rise and Decline of the Hollywood Studios. McFarland, 2013.
