= Hold That Lion =

Hold That Lion may refer to:

- Hold That Lion (1926 film), a silent comedy
- Hold That Lion! (1947 film), a short comedy starring The Three Stooges
