= Let's Be Fashionable =

1920 film by Lloyd Ingraham

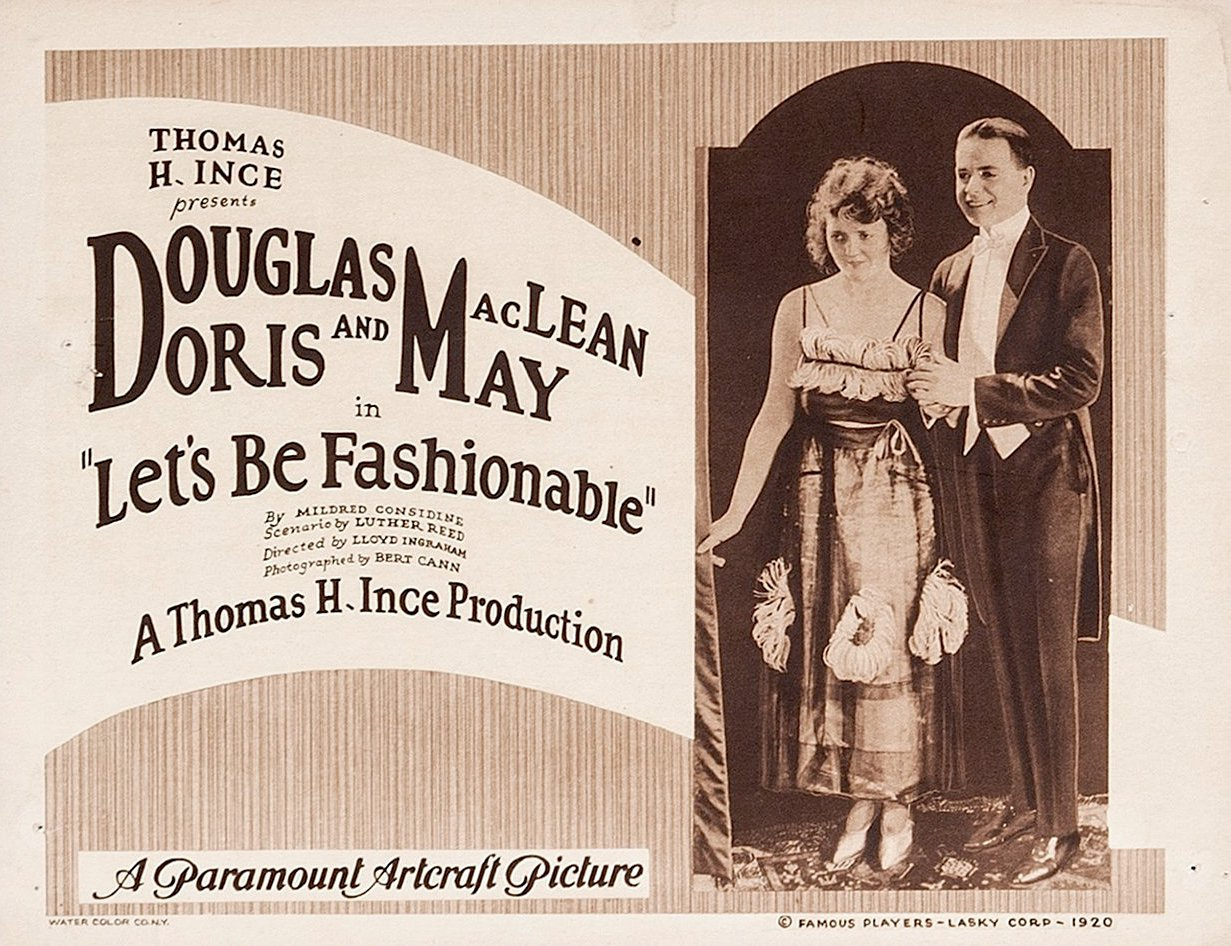
- Lobby card
- Directed by: Lloyd Ingraham
- Screenplay by: Mildred Considine; Luther Reed
- Produced by: Thomas H. Ince
- Starring: Douglas MacLean; Doris May; Wade Boteler; Grace Morse; George Webb; Wilbur Higby
- Cinematography: Bert Cann
- Edited by: George Crone
- Production companies: Thomas H. Ince Productions; Artcraft Pictures Corporation; Famous Players–Lasky Corporation
- Distributed by: Paramount Pictures
- Release date: June 13, 1920
- Running time: 50 minutes
- Country: United States
- Language: Silent (English intertitles)

Let's Be Fashionable is a lost 1920 American silent comedy film directed by Lloyd Ingraham and written by Mildred Considine and Luther Reed. The film stars Douglas MacLean, Doris May, Wade Boteler, Grace Morse, George Webb, and Wilbur Higby. The film was released on June 13, 1920, by Paramount Pictures.

== Cast ==
- Douglas MacLean as Henry Langdon
- Doris May as Evelyn Langdon
- Wade Boteler as John Hammond
- Grace Morse as Elsie Hammond
- George Webb as Bruce Grey
- Wilbur Higby as George Barrymore
- Mollie McConnell as Mrs. Trude
- Norris Johnson as Betty Turner
