= The Hottentot =

1929 film

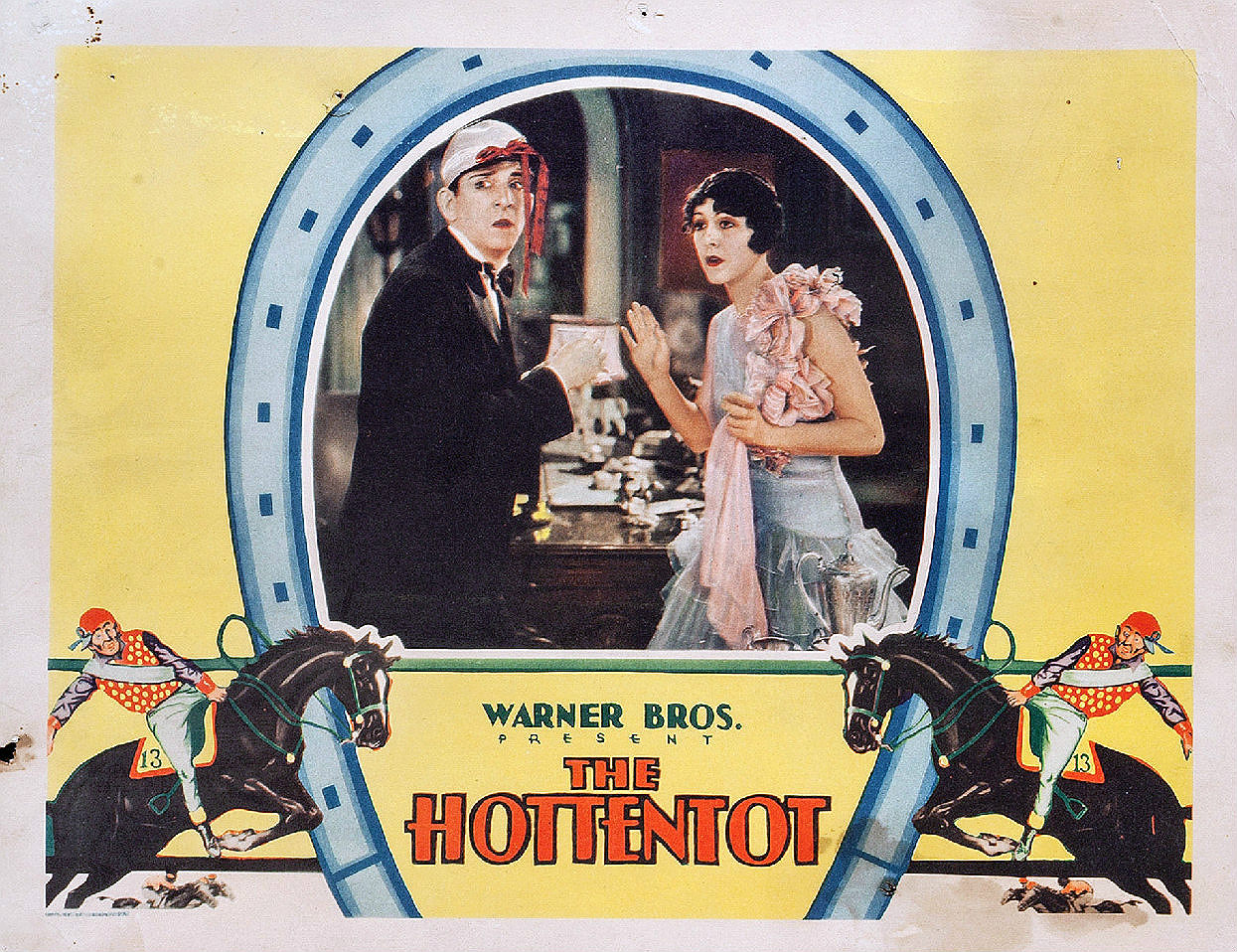
- Lobby card
- Directed by: Roy Del Ruth
- Screenplay by: Harvey Thew (adaptation)
- Based on: The Hottentot; 1920 play by William Collier Sr. Victor Mapes
- Starring: Edward Everett Horton; Patsy Ruth Miller
- Cinematography: Barney McGill
- Edited by: Owen Marks
- Music by: Cecil Copping; Alois Reiser
- Production company: Warner Bros. Pictures
- Distributed by: Warner Bros. Pictures
- Release date: August 10, 1929
- Running time: 79 minutes
- Country: United States
- Languages: Sound (All-Talking); English

The Hottentot is a lost 1929 American all-talking sound pre-Code comedy film directed by Roy Del Ruth and starring Edward Everett Horton and Patsy Ruth Miller. It is based on the 1920 Broadway play The Hottentot by William Collier Sr. and Victor Mapes.

A previous silent version was produced by Thomas H. Ince in 1922, starring Douglas MacLean.

== Plot ==
Sam Harrington has a lifelong terror of horses—so naturally, he finds himself impersonating a champion steeplechase rider.

Sam is in love with Peggy Fairfax, an avid horsewoman who lives on a country estate with her brother and a lively circle of friends who admire daring riders and fine horses. Hoping to matchmake, the mischievous Mrs. Chadwick invites Sam from California to visit Peggy under false pretenses. She has convinced everyone he is S. Jay Harrington, the famous steeplechase champion. In truth, Sam has never been on a horse.

With the big steeplechase race fast approaching, the Fairfax household is in a frenzy. Ollie Gilford is desperate to find someone who can ride Hottentot, a wild and unmanageable horse. Meanwhile, Peggy needs a brave jockey to ride her own prized horse, Bountiful, in her colors.

When Sam arrives, everyone assumes their problems are solved. Mrs. Chadwick and Ollie strong-arm him into agreeing to ride Hottentot, and Peggy—unaware of Sam's fear—asks him to ride Bountiful instead. Sam agrees, thinking it might buy him time. To him, one horse is as terrifying as another.

As the race nears, Sam is paralyzed with fear and desperate to escape. Fortunately for him, the clever butler Swift, whose loyalty Sam has purchased with generous tips, devises a scheme to spare him: he sneaks Bountiful out of her stall and hides her, hoping to cancel Sam's participation entirely. Unfortunately, Larry Crawford, a skilled equestrian and Sam's romantic rival, witnesses the act and becomes suspicious.

The next morning, Perkins, the groom, discovers Bountiful missing and sounds the alarm. Though she is eventually found, she has overeaten and is too bloated to race. Peggy is crushed. Larry accuses Sam of sabotage, which Sam narrowly deflects by claiming he did it to protect the horse from Larry's supposed mistreatment. The two men become open enemies.

On race day, Larry tells Peggy he has uncovered the truth—Sam is not the legendary S. Jay Harrington. Sam, however, enters dramatically, suited up in Peggy's racing silks, ready to ride Hottentot. His confession shocks the group: he admits the truth but declares he'll ride the wild horse anyway—even if it kills him.

To make amends, Sam reveals that he has purchased Hottentot from Ollie and presents the horse to Peggy as a gift, so that he can legally race under her colors. Peggy, moved by his courage, accepts both the horse and Sam's heartfelt gesture.

With great difficulty, eight grooms manage to subdue Hottentot for the race. In a series of comic yet perilous incidents, Sam manages to cling to the saddle through jumps, tumbles, and stumbles. With luck and determination, he narrowly wins the race and Peggy's admiration.

As the race ends, Sam finds himself sitting dazed in the saddle—on the ground—while the now-docile Hottentot gallops off. He has proven himself, both as a man and a (barely capable) rider. Sam is crowned with a victory wreath and finally wins the heart of Peggy Fairfax.

== Preservation ==
The sound discs for the International Sound Version are extant. This version of the film had all dialogue replaced with music and foreign language inter-titles while any non-dialogue portions of the film (e.g., those that featured music or sound effects) remained intact.

== Cast ==
- Edward Everett Horton as Sam Harrington
- Patsy Ruth Miller as Peggy Fairfax
- Douglas Gerrard as Swift
- Edward Earle as Larry Crawford
- Stanley Taylor as Alec Fairfax
- Gladys Brockwell as Mrs. Chadwick
- Maude Turner Gordon as May Gilford
- Otto Hoffman as Perkins
- Edmund Breese as Ollie

== See also ==
- List of early sound feature films (1926–1929)
- List of films about horses
- List of films about horse racing
