= When Love Comes =

When Love Comes may refer to:

- When Love Comes (1922 film), an American silent drama film
- When Love Comes (1998 film), a New Zealand drama film
- When Love Comes (2010 film), a Taiwanese film
- When Love Comes, a 2008 album by Calvin Richardson
