= Raymond Cannon (actor) =

American actor, film director and screenwriter

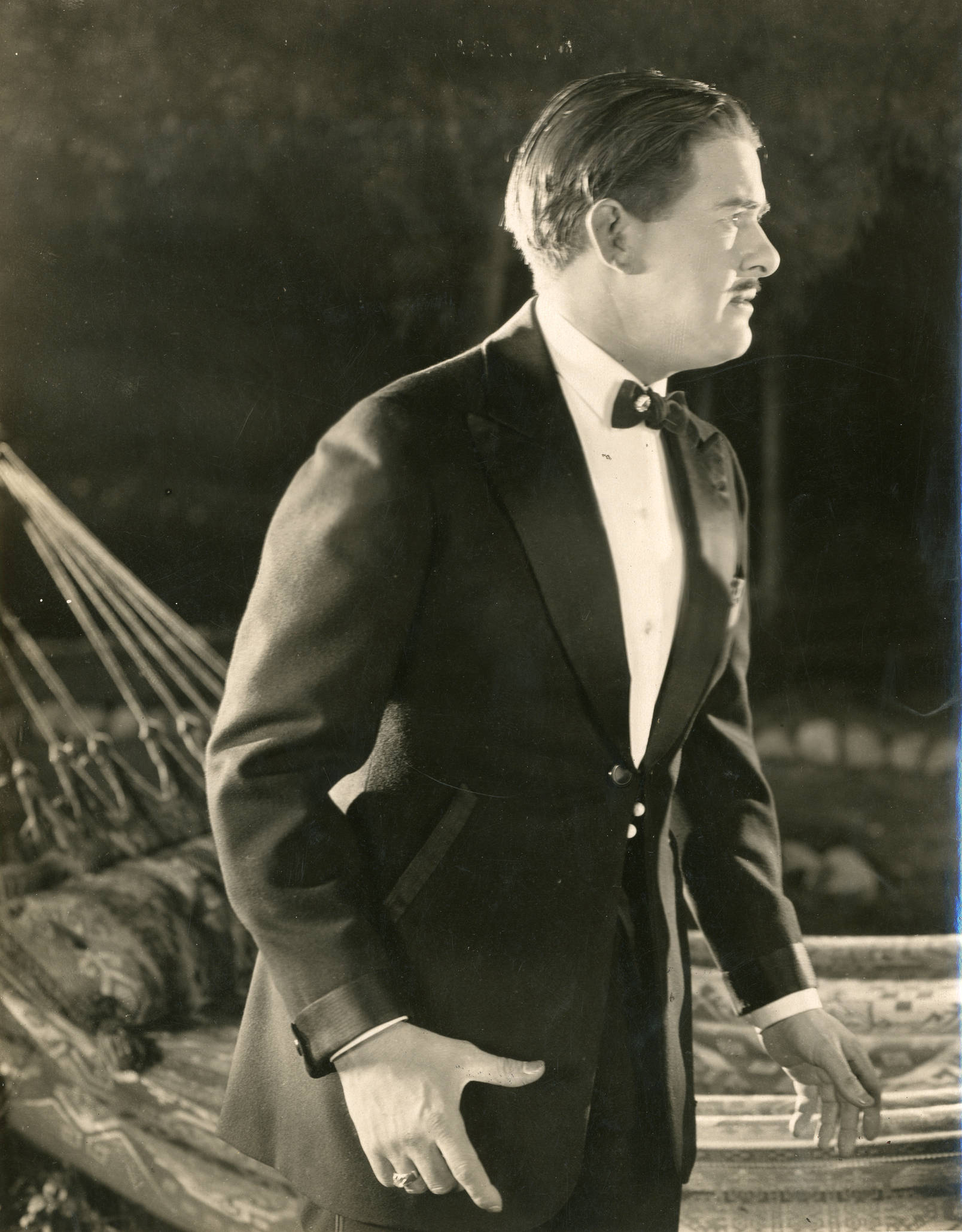
- Cannon in 1922
- Born: Ulises Tildmann Cannon; September 1, 1892; Long Hollow, Tennessee, U.S.
- Died: June 7, 1977 (aged 84); Hollywood, California, U.S.
- Other name: Ray Cannon
- Occupations: Film actor Film director Screenwriter; Journalist; Author
- Years active: 1913–1977
- Spouse: Fanchon Royer (m. 1920; div. 1931)
- Children: Royer; Elwood; Sandra
- Parent(s): Newton Cannon; Sarah Lincoln Bolinger
- Relatives: Manual Cannon (brother); Thornburg Cannon (brother)

Raymond Cannon (born Ulises Tildmann Cannon; September 1, 1892 – June 7, 1977) was an American actor, film director, screenwriter, journalist, and author known for his work with D. W. Griffith and Buster Keaton.

== Background ==
Ulises Tillman Cannon was born September 1, 1892, in Long Hollow, Tennessee, to Newton Cannon and Sarah Lincoln Bolinger. In 1910, he was working at a soda fountain in Knoxville, but after leaving divinity school, he moved west, performing in vaudeville and working as a journalist in Dallas and Fort Worth. In April 1918, Cannon became a journalist for Elmer M. Robbins' weekly magazine Camera! The Digest of the Motion Picture Industry. E.M. Robbins died in 1920 and Cannon bought the magazine in 1921, co-publishing it with Lola B Robbins until he sold his interest in 1922. On February 19, 1929, Cannon married Fanchon Royer, an actress-turned-journalist who began as society editor, then assistant editor, and then editor at Camera! until leaving it in 1922. She and Cannon divorced in 1931.

== Career ==
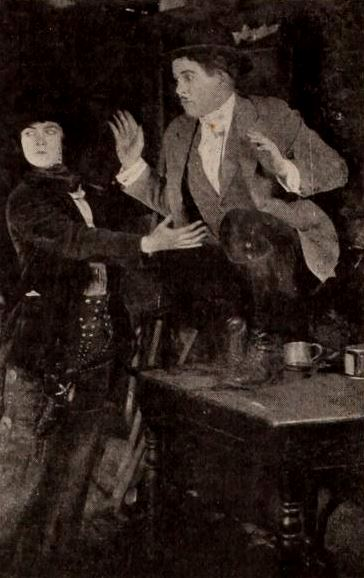
Dorothy Gish and Raymond Cannon in Nugget Nell (1919)

When Cannon reached Los Angeles in the early 1910s, he was using the name Raymond and his first acting job was in Long Beach in 1912 performing at the Bentley Grand Theater. He then found work in films with the Thomas Ince Company. His first film role was in the Selig Polyscope serial The Adventures of Kathlyn in 1913. Cannon worked for D. W. Griffith and appeared in several Dorothy Gish films. When Griffith moved his productions to Mamaroneck, New York, Cannon remained in Los Angeles as a freelancer working with Douglas MacLean. In 1924, Cannon left acting and began screenwriting. In 1925, Cannon had been hired by Buster Keaton and co-wrote the 1925 film Go West, after which Keaton loaned him to Universal Studios and Cannon did not return. After numerous projects as film director and screenwriter, his last film effort was Samurai for Cavalcade Pictures in 1945, after which he turned his attentions to Los Angeles stage. One of his productions Her Majesty the Prince, starred Carla Laemmle.

Entering semi-retirement at the urging of his doctor, Cannon turned his attention to his hobby of sport fishing off the Baja coast. He subsequently wrote the books How to Fish the Pacific Coast (1952) and The Sea of Cortez (1965), as well as authoring a fishing column in Western Outdoor News for 24 years. Laemmle became his long-term typist, illustrator, researcher, and editor. He and Laemmle remained companions until his death in 1977 from complications resulting from treatment for lung cancer.

== Filmography ==
=== Actor ===
- The Adventures of Kathlyn (1913)
- Boots (1919) as The chauffeur
- True Heart Susie (1919) as Sporty Malone
- Nugget Nell (1919) as The City Chap
- Nobody Home (1919) as Crandall Park
- Turning the Tables (1919) as Monty Feverill
- Mary Ellen Comes to Town (1920) as 'Beauty' Bender
- Chickens (1921) as Willie Figg
- Penny of Top Hill Trail (1921) as Jo Gary
- The Unfoldment (1922) as Jack Nevin
- Watch Your Step (1922) as Lon Kimball
- His Back Against the Wall (1922) as Jimmy Boyle
- Mary of the Movies (1923) as Oswald Tate
- The Printer's Devil (1923) as Alec Sperry

=== Director ===
- Red Wine (1928)
- Joy Street (1929)
- Why Leave Home? (1929)
- Taking Ways (1930)
- Ladies Must Play (1930)
- The Victim (1930)
- Imagine My Embarrassment (1930)
- Swanee River (1931)
- Night Life in Reno (1931)
- Hotel Variety (1933)
- The Outer Gate (1937)
- Swing It, Sailor! (1938)
- Samurai (1945)

=== Screenwriter ===
- The Yankee Consul (1924)
- Never Say Die (1924)
- Introduce Me (1925) (story)
- Go West (1925) (scenario)
- The Carnival Girl (1926) (titles & story)
- The Whole Town's Talking (1926) (adaptation and scenario)
- Taxi! Taxi! (1927) (adaptation)
- Fast and Furious (1927) (adaptation)
- The Rejuvenation of Aunt Mary (1927)
- The Broncho Buster (1927)
- Something Always Happens (1928)
- Red Wine (1928)
- Joy Street (1929)
- Taking Ways (1930)
- Imagine My Embarrassment (1930)
- Old Age Pension (1935)
- My Girl Sally (1935)
- His Last Fling (1935)
- Bring 'Em Back a Lie (1935)
- Tailspin Tommy in The Great Air Mystery (1935)
- Samurai (1945)
