= That's My Baby (1926 film) =

1926 film

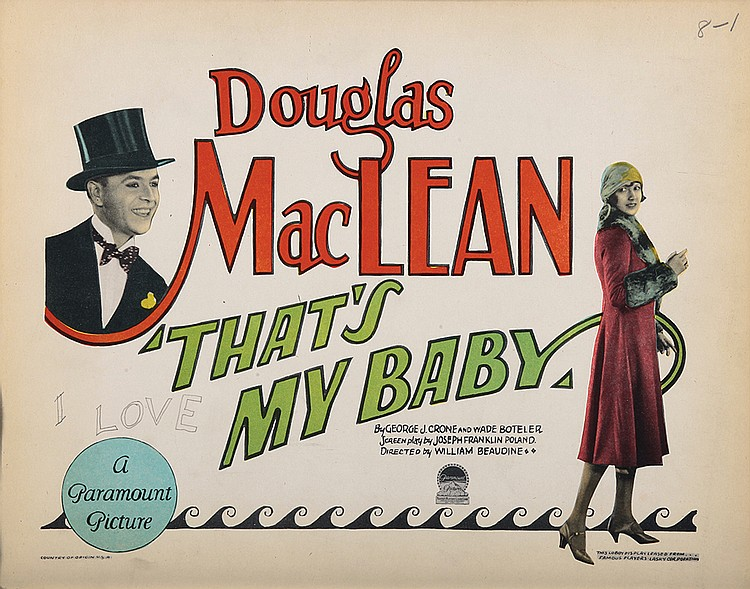
- Film poster
- Directed by: William Beaudine
- Written by: Wade Boteler; George Crone; Tay Garnett
- Produced by: Adolph Zukor; Jesse Lasky
- Starring: Douglas MacLean
- Cinematography: Jack MacKenzie
- Distributed by: Paramount Pictures
- Release date: April 19, 1926
- Running time: 70 minutes
- Country: United States
- Language: Silent (English intertitles)

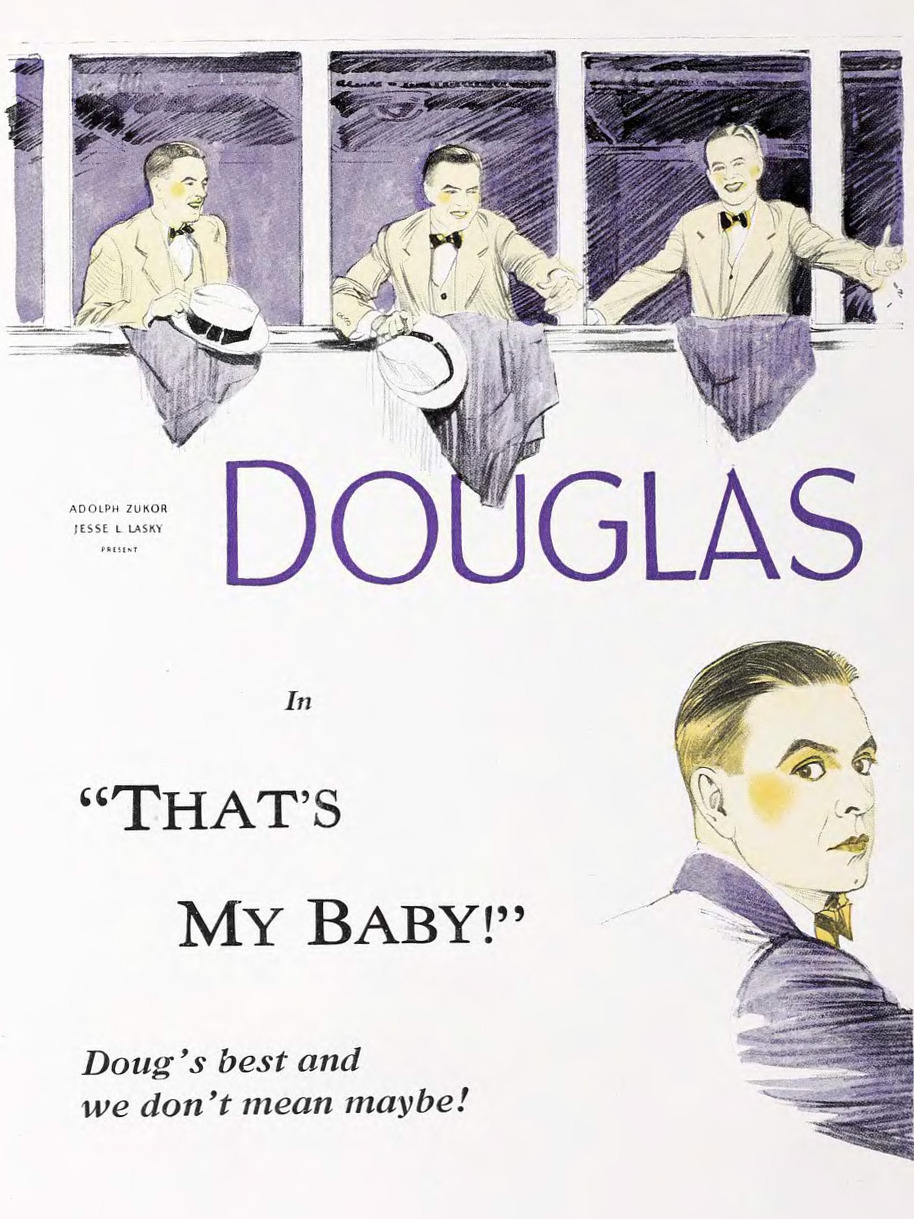
That's My Baby 1925 advertisement

That's My Baby is a 1926 American silent comedy film directed by William Beaudine.

== Plot ==
As described in a film magazine, Alan Boyd's contention that a woman's ankles determine her character brings him to a masquerade party where he hopes to discover the owner of a pair of perfect ones. After much ado, he finally locates the young woman, Helen Raynor. However, he finds that her mother takes a cordial dislike to him, her father is a business competitor, and a disagreeable rival places a baby in Alan's arms and then announces that he is the father. Further complications arise when Alan learns that he has given Helen's father arsenic instead of headache powder. In the end, all ends well as Alan wins the affection of Helen.

== Cast ==
- Douglas MacLean as Alan Boyd
- Margaret Morris as Helen Raynor
- Claude Gillingwater as John Raynor
- Eugenie Forde as Mrs. John Raynor
- Wade Boteler as Dave Barton
- Richard Tucker as Schuyler Van Loon
- Fred Kelsey as Murphy
- Harry Earles as The Baby
- William Orlamond as Drug Clerk

== Preservation ==
A surviving copy of That's My Baby is preserved at the Centre national du cinéma et de l'image animée in Paris.
