= Let It Rain (1927 film) =

1927 film

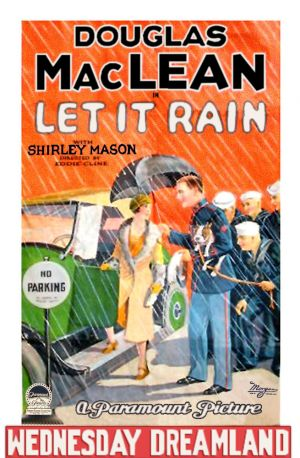
- Film poster
- Directed by: Edward F. Cline
- Written by: Wade Boteler; George Crone; Earle Snell
- Produced by: Douglas MacLean Productions
- Starring: Douglas MacLean; Shirley Mason
- Cinematography: Jack MacKenzie
- Distributed by: Paramount Pictures
- Release date: February 12, 1927
- Running time: 70 minutes
- Country: United States
- Language: Silent (English intertitles)

Let It Rain is a lost 1927 American silent comedy film produced by and starring Douglas MacLean, directed by Edward F. Cline, and featuring Boris Karloff in a minor role as a U.S. mail robber. Paramount Pictures distributed the film. The film is now lost.

== Plot ==
A Marine sergeant named "Let-It-Rain" Riley falls in love with a young lady and goes AWOL in order to meet up with her before a sailor aboard his ship (who he competes with for girls) can take his shore leave to go meet her. During the events that follow, Riley and the girl expose the criminals behind a mail robbery. Riley winds up getting his commission as well as the girl.

== Cast ==
- Douglas MacLean as 'Let-It-Rain' Riley
- Shirley Mason as The Girl
- Wade Boteler as Kelly (a gob)
- Frank Campeau as Marine Major
- James Bradbury Jr. as Butch
- Lincoln Stedman as Bugs
- Lee Shumway as Marine Captain
- Jim Mason as Crook (as James Mason)
- Eddie Sturgis as Crook (as Edwin Sturgis)
- Ernest Hilliard as Crook
- Boris Karloff as Crook

== See also ==
- Boris Karloff filmography
