= Frances Lee =

American actress (1906–2000)

- Postcard (1928–1930)
- Born: Merna Phyllis Tibbetts; May 5, 1906; Eagle Grove, Iowa, U.S.
- Died: November 5, 2000 (aged 94); Cardiff-by-the-Sea, California, U.S.
- Occupations: Actress, Ziegfeld Girl
- Years active: 1924–1935
- Spouse: Alexander Bennett (died 1977)

Frances Lee (born Merna Phyllis Tibbetts; May 5, 1906 – November 5, 2000) was an American film actress during Hollywood's silent film era, and well into the sound film era of the 1930s.

With Billy Dooley in Misfit Sailor act

== Dancing career ==
Frances Lee was born Merna Phyllis Tibbetts to William George and Nellie (née Leach) Tibbetts in Eagle Grove, Iowa. She initially began pursuing a career as a teacher but began taking dance lessons, which led to her being spotted by Gus Edwards, who owned a theater in New York City. Edwards persuaded Lee to perform at his theater, and she joined the cast of The Ziegfeld Follies in 1923, when she was hired by Al Christie to perform in his Christie Comedies. Later that year, cover artist Neysa McMein chose her as one of the best of six different types of beauties.

== Silent film career ==
Moving to Hollywood in the mid-1920s to pursue acting, Lee received her first film role in 1924, starring in Hello and Goodbye, a comedy short film that brought her to the attention of the studios and launched her into a very successful and busy silent film career. In 1925, Lee had roles in three films, and in 1926 her number of films jumped to seven. Lee was a frequent guest at the home of Mary Pickford and Douglas Fairbanks and became friends with other notable Hollywood legends, including Rudolph Valentino until his death in 1926. In 1927 she had roles in five films and was selected as one of thirteen girls to be WAMPAS Baby Stars, which that year included silent film star Sally Phipps and actress Barbara Kent.

1928 was a successful year for Lee, as she starred in nine films, the most memorable of which was Sweeties with Bobby Vernon. Her biggest year by far was 1929, when she starred in ten films, including the lead role in Stage Struck Susie opposite Eddie Barry and Divorce Made Easy starring alongside Marie Prevost and Douglas MacLean. In 1934, she married Alexander Bennett, brother to Australian silent film actress Enid Bennett. Their wedding was attended by such Hollywood legends as Enid Bennett's husband, film producer Fred Niblo; actresses Gloria Swanson and Greta Garbo; and actors Rod La Rocque and John Gilbert.

== Transition to "talking films" and later life ==
Lee made a semisuccessful transition to "talking films", while the majority of silent film stars did not. Her first film in 1930 was Down with Husbands followed by The Stronger Sex, starring Carmel Myers. However, Lee's career had slowed considerably from the silent film years, and from 1931 to 1935 she had roles in only seven films. Lee auditioned for the female lead role in King Kong and was one of two actresses finally considered for the role, losing it ultimately to Fay Wray.

== Later years ==
Lee retired from film acting after 1935, living with her husband in Beverly Hills, California. She began working in interior design and studied for and received a degree in teaching. Lee and her husband lived in Brentwood, where she began one of the early Head Start programs at Knox Presbyterian Nursery School. She also taught dance, society behavior, and etiquette at the Elisa Ryan Studio, where she instructed the daughters of President Richard M. Nixon. In 1972, Lee and Alex moved to Cardiff-by-the-Sea. She worked as a children's librarian at the Rancho Santa Fe Library until only a few years before her death.

Lee died on November 5, 2000, in Cardiff-by-the-Sea, California, aged 94.

== Partial filmography ==
- Good as Gold (1927)
- The Little Snob (1928)
- Nifty Numbers (1928)
- Chicken a La King (1928)
- The Carnation Kid (1929)
- Divorce Made Easy (1929)
- The Show of Shows (1929) (uncredited)
- Phantom Thunderbolt (1933)
- Her Splendid Folly (1933)
