= Fanny Midgley =

American actress

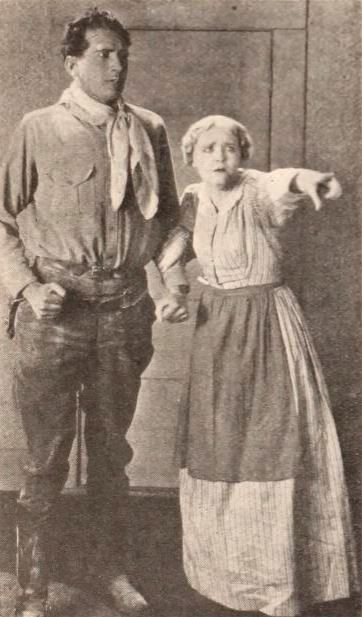
- Lester Cuneo and Midgley in Blue Blazes (1922)
- Born: Fanny B. Tilton; November 26, 1865; Cincinnati, Ohio, U.S.
- Died: January 4, 1932 (aged 66); Hollywood, California, U.S.
- Occupation: Film actress
- Years active: 1911–1932
- Spouse(s): Sager Midgley, Cecil S. Frier

Fanny Midgley (born Fanny B. Tilton; November 26, probably 1865 – January 4, 1932) was an American film actress of Hollywood's early years, mostly in silent films.

== Biography ==
Midgley was born Fanny B. Tilton in Cincinnati, Ohio, the daughter of Joseph Tilton and Henrietta Garrison. Her death certificate gives a birth date of November 26, 1879, but it is more likely that she was born about 1865, as she is listed with her parents in the 1870 and 1880 censuses as being 5 and 14 years old.

She married fellow actor Sager Midgley, Jr.(1862-1929), in Cincinnati in 1885, and they performed together as a Vaudeville act, finding the footlights in New York by 1890. They had four known children, at least two of which died in infancy. A surviving son, Miles Raymond Midgley (1899-1945) also worked in show business.

Fanny Midgley's work on stage included portraying Mopsa in the Broadway production The Free Lance (1906).

After moving to Hollywood, Midgley married Cecil S. Frier on August 14, 1914.

Midgley's first feature film was Shorty Escapes Marriage (1914). In 1914 alone, she had 27 film appearances, including The Sheriff of Bisbee, in which she starred with actress Mildred Harris, the future mother of Charlie Chaplin's first child. From 1915 through 1919, she appeared in another 32 films, mostly in supporting roles. Her last film appearance during this period was the 1919 film The Lottery Man, in which she starred with Wanda Hawley and Wallace Reid.

During the 1920s, her career began to slow, appearing in 22 films between 1920 and 1926, with her biggest film role during that time being in the 1922 film The Young Rajah with Rudolph Valentino. From 1927 to 1929, her career almost completely halted compared to her previous years, with only five film appearances during this period, most notably with Buddy Roosevelt in The Cowboy Cavalier in 1928.

She did transition somewhat successfully to sound films, and appeared in the 1930 movie The Poor Millionaire, starring Richard Talmadge and Constance Howard. In 1931, she appeared in An American Tragedy, starring Sylvia Sidney and Phillips Holmes.

Midgley died on January 4, 1932, in Hollywood. Her death certificate gave her age as 52, but given census records, it is more likely that she was about 67.

== Partial filmography ==
- The Immortal Alamo (1911)
- The Italian (1915)
- Somewhere in France (1916)
- The Apostle of Vengeance (1916)
- Blood Will Tell (1917)
- Madam Who? (1918)
- Wolves of the Rail (1918)
- How Could You, Jean? (1918)
- Cheating the Public (1918)
- The Goat (1918)
- The Corsican Brothers (1920)
- Always Audacious (1920)
- All Soul's Eve (1921)
- Patsy (1921)
- Don't Call Me Little Girl (1921)
- First Love (1921)
- The Young Rajah (1922)
- When Love Comes (1922)
- Stephen Steps Out (1923)
- Greed (1924)
- Some Pun'kins (1925)
- Three of a Kind (1925)
- The Dangerous Dub (1926)
- The Fighting Cheat (1926)
- Ace of Action (1926)
- Hair-Trigger Baxter (1926)
- The Harvester (1927)
- The Flyin' Buckaroo (1928)
- The Cowboy Cavalier (1928)
- Behind Closed Doors (1929)
- The Poor Millionaire (1930)
- An American Tragedy (1931)
