= A Man of Action (1923 film) =

1923 film

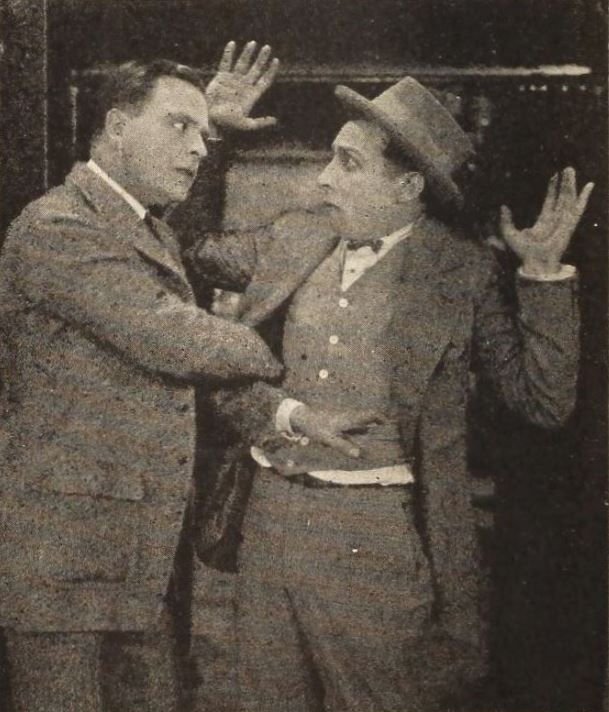
- Film still
- Directed by: James W. Horne
- Screenplay by: Bradley King
- Starring: Douglas MacLean; Marguerite De La Motte; Raymond Hatton; Wade Boteler; Arthur Millett; Kingsley Benedict
- Cinematography: Max Dupont
- Production company: Thomas H. Ince Corporation
- Distributed by: Associated First National Pictures
- Release date: June 3, 1923
- Running time: 60 minutes
- Country: United States
- Language: Silent (English intertitles)

A Man of Action is a 1923 American silent comedy film directed by James W. Horne and written by Bradley King. The film stars Douglas MacLean, Marguerite De La Motte, Raymond Hatton, Wade Boteler, Arthur Millett, and Kingsley Benedict. The film was released on June 3, 1923, by Associated First National Pictures.

== Cast ==
- Douglas MacLean as Bruce MacAllister
- Marguerite De La Motte as Helen Sumner
- Raymond Hatton as Harry Hopwood
- Wade Boteler as Spike McNab
- Arthur Millett as Dr. Sumner
- Kingsley Benedict as Andy
- Arthur Stuart Hull as Eugene Preston
- William Courtright as The 'Deacon'
- Katherine Lewis as 'Frisco' Rose

== Preservation status ==
A print of A Man of Action is reportedly held at the EYE Film Institute Netherlands.
