= The Carnation Kid =

1929 film

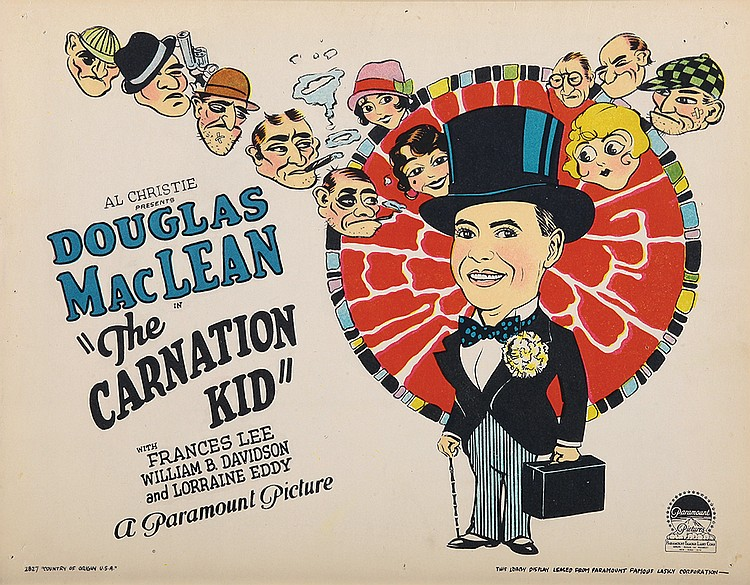
- Lobby card
- Directed by: E. Mason Hopper; Leslie Pearce
- Screenplay by: Alfred A. Cohn; Arthur Huffsmith; Henry McCarty
- Produced by: Al Christie; George Christie
- Starring: Douglas MacLean; Frances Lee; William B. Davidson; Lorraine MacLean; Charles Hill Mailes; Francis McDonald
- Cinematography: Alex Phillips; Monte Steadman
- Edited by: Grace Dazey
- Production company: Christie Film Company
- Distributed by: Paramount Pictures
- Release date: March 2, 1929
- Running time: 76 minutes
- Country: United States
- Languages: Sound (Part-Talkie); English intertitles

The Carnation Kid is a 1929 American sound part-talkie drama film directed by E. Mason Hopper and Leslie Pearce and written by Alfred A. Cohn, Arthur Huffsmith, and Henry McCarty. In addition to sequences with audible dialogue or talking sequences, the film features a synchronized musical score and sound effects along with English intertitles. The soundtrack was recorded using the Western Electric sound-on-film system. The film stars Douglas MacLean, Frances Lee, William B. Davidson, Lorraine MacLean, Charles Hill Mailes, and Francis McDonald. The film was released on March 2, 1929, by Paramount Pictures.

== Cast ==
- Douglas MacLean as Clarence Kendall
- Frances Lee as Doris Whitely
- William B. Davidson as Blythe
- Lorraine MacLean as Lucille
- Charles Hill Mailes as Crawford Whitely
- Francis McDonald as The Carnation Kid
- Maurice Black as Tony
- Ben Swor Jr. as Blinkey
- Carl Stockdale as Deacon

== Music ==
The film featured a theme song entitled "Carnations (Remind Me of You)" with words and music by Sterling Sherwin.

== See also ==
- List of early sound feature films (1926–1929)
