= Speed Madness (1932 film) =

1932 film

- Directed by: George Crone
- Written by: Charles R. Condon
- Produced by: Richard Talmadge
- Starring: Richard Talmadge; Nancy Drexel; Huntley Gordon
- Cinematography: Harry Cooper; Jack Stevens
- Edited by: Doane Harrison
- Production company: Richard Talmadge Productions
- Distributed by: Mercury Pictures; Ideal Films (UK)
- Release date: July 30, 1932
- Running time: 63 minutes
- Country: United States
- Language: English

Speed Madness is a 1932 American action film directed by George Crone and starring Richard Talmadge, Nancy Drexel and Huntley Gordon.

== Plot ==
Bob Stuart, the idle son of a shipbuilding magnate gets a job at his father's shipyard. The company's major project is to design a new speedboat in order to win a major new contract but faces sabotage from rivals. Bob turns out to be surprisingly able and manages to help with the construction of the boat. He plans to drive it himself during the race, but narrowly escapes a bomb planted on it by their opponents. He confronts the gang behind it, and secures the contract for his father.

== Cast ==
- Richard Talmadge as Bob Stuart
- Charles Sellon as Jim Stuart
- Lucien Littlefield as Forbes
- Nancy Drexel as Joan Harlan
- Huntley Gordon as Harrington
- Donald Keith as Alan Harlan
- Pat O'Malley as McCarey
- Matthew Betz as Jessin
- Wade Boteler as Bill Collector
- Walter Brennan as Joe

== Bibliography ==
- Langman, Larry & Finn, Daniel. A Guide to American Crime Films of the Thirties. Greenwood Press, 1995.
- Rollyson, Carl. A Real American Character: The Life of Walter Brennan. University Press of Mississippi, 2015.
