= Chickens (1921 film) =

1921 film

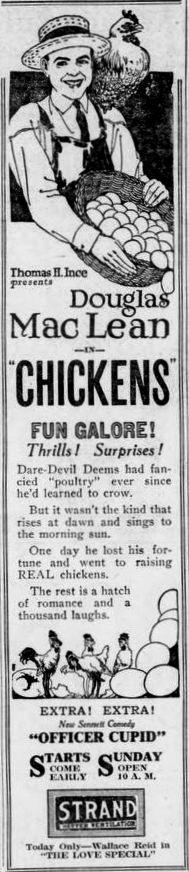
- Newspaper ad
- Directed by: Jack Nelson
- Screenplay by: Agnes Christine Johnston
- Based on: "Yanconna Yillies" by Herschel S. Hall
- Produced by: Thomas H. Ince
- Starring: Douglas MacLean; Gladys George; Claire McDowell; Charles Hill Mailes
- Cinematography: Bert Cann
- Production companies: Thomas H. Ince Corporation; Famous Players–Lasky Corporation
- Distributed by: Paramount Pictures
- Release date: February 13, 1921
- Running time: 50 minutes
- Country: United States
- Language: Silent (English intertitles)

Chickens is a 1921 American silent comedy drama film directed by Jack Nelson and written by Agnes Christine Johnston based on the story "Yanconna Yillies" by Herschel S. Hall. The film stars Douglas MacLean, Gladys George, Claire McDowell, Charles Hill Mailes, Raymond Cannon, and Willis Marks. The film was released on February 13, 1921, by Paramount Pictures. It is not known whether the film currently survives.

== Cast ==
- Douglas MacLean as Deems Stanwood
- Gladys George as Julia Stoneman
- Claire McDowell as Aunt Rebecca
- Charles Hill Mailes as Dan Bellows
- Raymond Cannon as Willie Figg
- Willis Marks as Philip Thawson
- Al W. Filson as Decker
