= Taxi! Taxi! (1927 film) =

1927 film

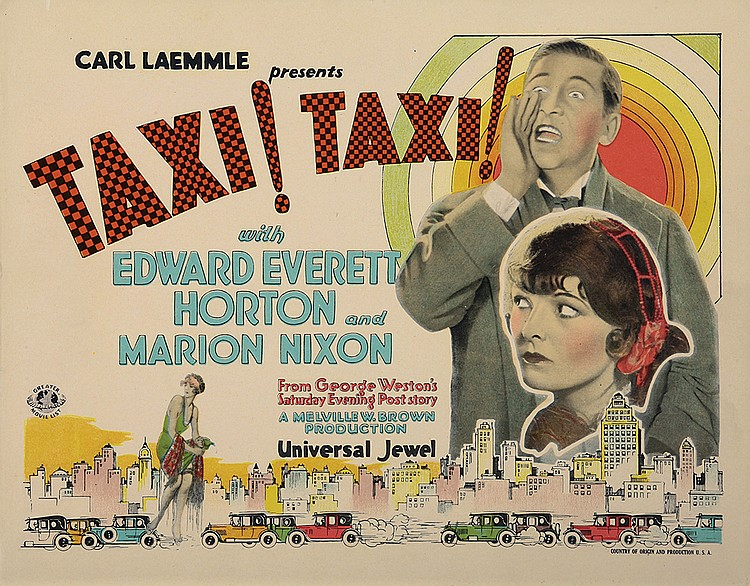
- Lobby card
- Directed by: Melville W. Brown
- Written by: Melville W. Brown; Raymond Cannon (adaptation)
- Based on: Taxi! Taxi! by George Weston
- Produced by: Carl Laemmle
- Starring: Edward Everett Horton; Marian Nixon; Burr McIntosh; Edward Martindel
- Cinematography: Gilbert Warrenton
- Distributed by: Universal Jewel
- Release date: April 24, 1927
- Running time: 70 minutes
- Country: United States
- Language: Silent (English intertitles)

Taxi! Taxi! is a 1927 American silent comedy film directed by Melville W. Brown and written by Melville W. Brown and Raymond Cannon. It is based on the 1925 short story of the same name by George Weston that was originally serialized in The Saturday Evening Post magazine. The film stars Edward Everett Horton, Marian Nixon, Burr McIntosh, and Edward Martindel. The film was released on April 24, 1927, by Universal Pictures under their 'Jewel' banner.

== Plot ==
Peter Whitby, who works as a draftsman in a large architectural firm, is commissioned to meet Rose, the niece of Zimmerman, president of the company, at the station. The young woman is favorably impressed by Peter and asks to have him as a companion on her tour of the city. The two go to eat at a restaurant where Rose's uncle had forbidden her to go. At the club, Zimmerman is having a meeting with Parmalee, a wealthy businessman. Rose and Peter, in order not to be seen by their uncle, leave, however, arousing the suspicions of an investigator. Unable to find a taxi, Peter buys one, ignoring that it is the "white taxi", a car used in some robberies and murders. Zimmerman wants to send Rose home, while Peter tries to fetch the young woman. Pursued by the police, by Zimmerman and Parmalee, the two young men manage to get to a justice of the peace who marries them while, in the meantime, the real criminals of the "white taxi" are arrested.

== Cast ==
- Edward Everett Horton as Peter Whitby
- Marian Nixon as Rose Zimmerman
- Burr McIntosh as Grant Zimmerman
- Edward Martindel as David Parmalee
- William V. Mong as Nosey Ricketts
- Lucien Littlefield as Billy Wallace
- Freeman Wood as Jersey
- Helen Ferguson as Undetermined Secondary Role (uncredited)

== Preservation ==
The film was rediscovered in late 2024 as a "Show-At-Home" 16mm print and was screened at the Bruno Walter Auditorium in New York Public Library for the Performing Arts on January 11, 2025.
