= The White Black Sheep =

1926 film by Sidney Olcott

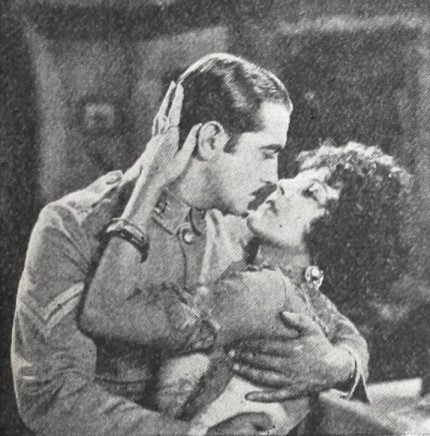
- Still with Barthelmess and Miller
- Directed by: Sidney Olcott
- Written by: Jerome N. Wilson; Agnes Pat McKenna
- Based on: Violet E. Powell (story)
- Produced by: Inspiration Pictures
- Starring: Richard Barthelmess
- Cinematography: David W. Gobbett
- Edited by: Tom Miranda
- Distributed by: First National Pictures
- Release date: December 12, 1926
- Running time: 8 reels
- Country: United States
- Language: Silent (English intertitles)

The White Black Sheep is a 1926 American silent drama film produced by Inspiration Pictures and distributed by First National. it was directed by Sidney Olcott with Richard Barthelmess and Patsy Ruth Miller in the lead roles.

== Cast ==
- Richard Barthelmess as Robert Kincairn
- Patsy Ruth Miller as Zelie
- Constance Howard as Enid Gower
- Erville Alderson as Yasuf
- William H. Tooker as Colonel Kincairn
- Gino Corrado as El Rahib
- Albert Prisco as Kadir
- Sam Appel as Dimos
- Col G.L. McDonell as Colonel Nicholson
- Templar Saxe as Stanley Fielding

== Production ==
The White Black Sheep was shot in First National studios in Burbank, California.
