= The Outer Gate =

1937 film by Raymond Joseph Cannon

- Directed by: Raymond Cannon
- Written by: A. Laurie Brazee (screenplay); Octavus Roy Cohen (novel)
- Produced by: Lew Cantor (associate producer); I.E. Chadwick (producer)
- Cinematography: Marcel Le Picard
- Edited by: Carl Pierson
- Distributed by: Monogram Pictures
- Release date: August 4, 1937
- Running time: 62 minutes
- Country: United States
- Language: English

The Outer Gate is a 1937 American film directed by actor/screenwriter Raymond Cannon. The screenplay concerns a man who organizes a revenge plot after being sent to prison for a crime he did not commit.

== Plot summary ==
Bob Terry works for John Borden, and has eyes for his daughter, but after he's accused of stealing and is sent to prison for a crime he didn't commit, he organizes a revenge plot.

== Cast ==
- Ralph Morgan as John Borden
- Kay Linaker as Lois Borden
- Ben Alexander as Bob Terry
- Eddie Acuff as Todd
- Charles Brokaw as Gangster John Carmody
- Robert Cummings as Judge
