= Wolves of the Rail =

1918 film

Wolves of the Rails
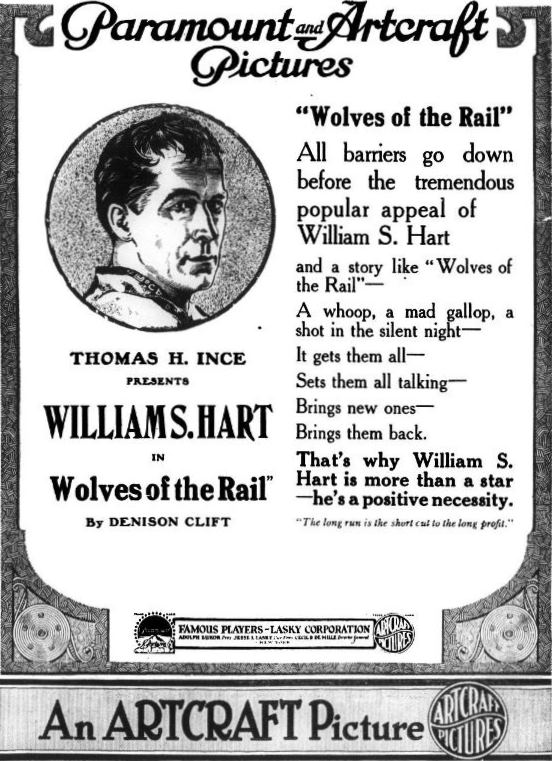
- Advertisement
- Directed by: William S. Hart
- Written by: Denison Clift (scenario)
- Produced by: William S. Hart; Thomas H. Ince
- Starring: William S. Hart
- Cinematography: Joseph H. August
- Production company: William S. Hart Productions
- Distributed by: Artcraft Pictures Corporation
- Release date: January 14, 1918
- Running time: 50 minutes; 5 reels
- Country: United States
- Languages: Silent; English intertitles

Wolves of the Rail is a 1918 American silent Western film produced, directed by, and starring William S. Hart. Thomas H. Ince assisted Hart in supervising the production.

== Plot ==
As described in a film magazine, "Buck" Andrade, an outlaw, promises his dying mother that he will reform himself. Taking a letter of introduction from a wounded man, he becomes a detective for the railroad, which he had previously held up several times. He is successful in capturing several bandits and also wins the love of Faith Lawson, who is a towerman (a type of railroad signalman). When the real detective recovers from his wounds and returns to duty, he discloses the true identity of Buck. Buck attempts to escape, but an attack on the railroad by his old gang forces him to remain. After he captures all of them, president of the railroad Murray Lemantier assists by allowing Buck to escape.

== Cast ==
- William S. Hart as "Buck" Andrade
- C. Norman Hammond as David Cassidy
- William Elmer as Pablo Trilles (credited as Billy Elmer)
- Melbourne MacDowell as Murray Lemantier
- Vola Vale as Faith Lawson
- Kisaburo Kurihara as Pasquale Trilles
- Fanny Midgley as Buck's Mother (uncredited)

== Reception ==
Like many American films of the time, Wolves of the Rail was subject to cuts by city and state film censorship boards. For example, the Chicago Board of Censors required a cut, in Reel 1, of beams on rail tracks, first three scenes of handling loot, Buck shooting Mexican bandits, two scenes of shooting Buck from horse, flagging train, holding up engineer, three scenes of holdup of train, Buck blowing tobacco smoke into detective's face, Buck shooting detective, Reel 4, two intertitles "Renegade deserter from the garrison" etc. and "That train will never get here—we'll wreck it", holdup of engineer in cab, fourteen scenes of Mexican bandits shooting at train, two scenes of bandits falling after Buck shoots, Reel 5, holdup of engine, six scenes of bandits shooting at train, intertitle "I'm going to kill you with my hands", and Buck choking bandits.

== Survival status ==
A print of Wolves of the Rail is held by the Library of Congress and the Gosfilmofond archive.
