= The Home Stretch =

1921 film

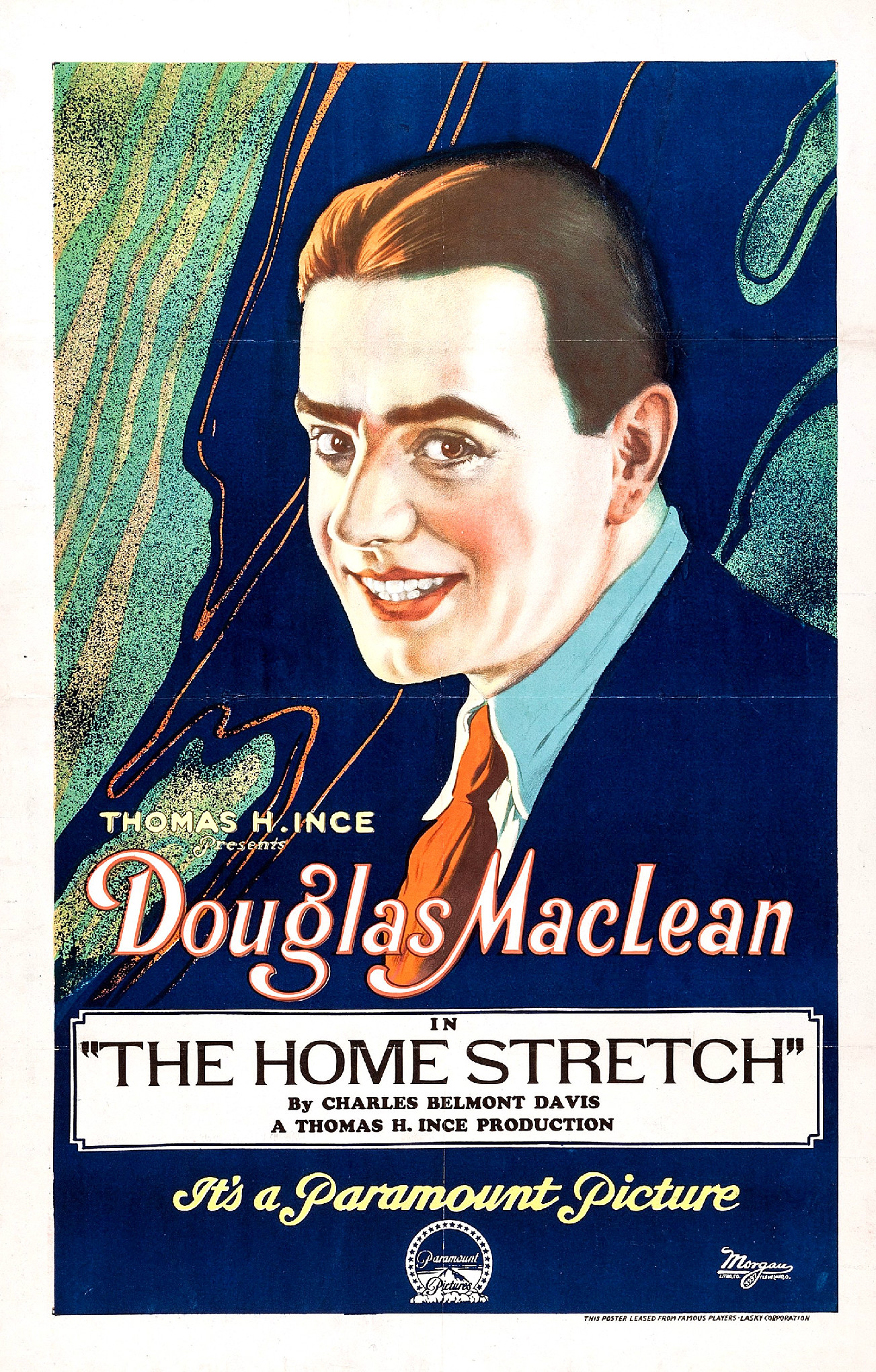
- Poster
- Directed by: Jack Nelson
- Screenplay by: Louis Stevens
- Based on: "When Johnny Comes Marching Home" (story) by Charles Belmont Davis
- Produced by: Thomas H. Ince
- Starring: Douglas MacLean; Beatrice Burnham; Walt Whitman; Margaret Livingston; Wade Boteler; Mary Jane Irving; Charles Hill Mailes
- Cinematography: Bert Cann
- Production companies: Thomas H. Ince Corporation; Famous Players–Lasky Corporation
- Distributed by: Paramount Pictures
- Release date: April 24, 1921
- Running time: 50 minutes
- Country: United States
- Language: Silent (English intertitles)

The Home Stretch is a surviving 1921 American silent drama film directed by Jack Nelson and written by Louis Stevens. The film stars Douglas MacLean, Beatrice Burnham, Walt Whitman, Margaret Livingston, Wade Boteler, Mary Jane Irving, and Charles Hill Mailes. Its screenplay was written by Louis Stevens and is based upon the short story "When Johnny Comes Marching Home" by Charles Belmont Davis, which appeared in the October 1914 issue of Metropolitan Magazine. The film was released on April 24, 1921, by Paramount Pictures.

== Cast ==
- Douglas MacLean as Johnny Hardwick
- Beatrice Burnham as Margaret Warren
- Walt Whitman as Mr. Warren
- Margaret Livingston as Molly
- Wade Boteler as Mr. Duffy
- Mary Jane Irving as Gwen Duffy
- Charles Hill Mailes as Mr. Wilson
- Mollie McConnell as Mrs. Wilson (*posthumous release for Mollie who died in 1920)
- Jack Singleton as Tommy Wilson
- Joseph Bennett as Hi Simpkins
- George Holmes as Skeeter

== Preservation status ==
Prints held at the UCLA Film & Television Archive, Library of Congress, and Academy Film Archive.
