= The Little Snob =

1928 film

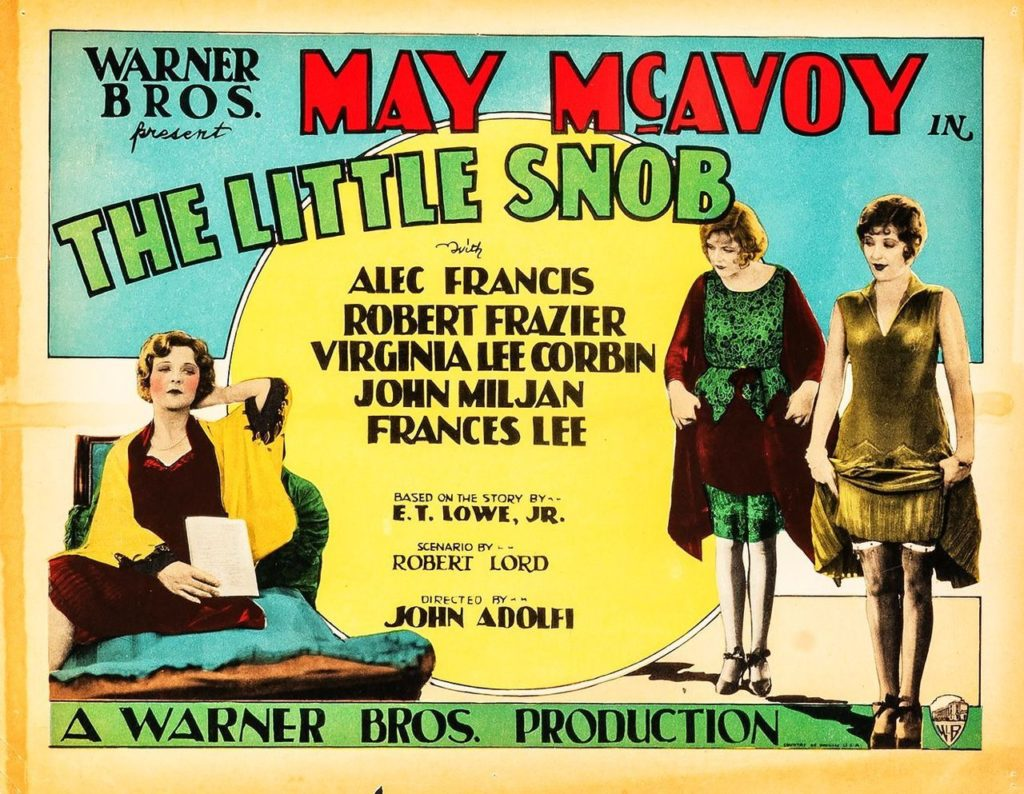
- Lobby card
- Directed by: John G. Adolfi
- Written by: Robert Lord (scenario); Joe Jackson (titles)
- Story by: Edward T. Lowe, Jr.
- Starring: May McAvoy; Robert Frazer
- Cinematography: Norbert Brodine
- Production company: Warner Bros.
- Distributed by: Warner Bros.
- Release date: February 11, 1928
- Running time: 60 minutes (6 reels; 5,331 feet)
- Country: United States
- Languages: Sound (Synchronized) (English Intertitles)

The Little Snob is a 1928 American synchronized sound comedy film from Warner Bros. While the film has no audible dialog, it was released with a synchronized musical score with sound effects using the sound-on-disc Vitaphone process.

== Plot ==
May Banks is a young woman who helps her father, Colonel Banks, operate his Kentucky Derby concession at Coney Island. Cherished by the carnival folk, May is also the sweetheart of Jim Nolan, the tent show barker. She is happy and content with her simple life among the show people.

Colonel Banks, having saved diligently, finally has enough money to send May to an exclusive finishing school for a year. With laughter and affection, May bids farewell to her father and Jim, joking that she will “high-hat” all her old friends when she returns.

At school, May is roomed with Alice and Jane, spoiled flappers who are wild and worldly wise. Generously gifted by her father, May quickly adopts the mannerisms and habits of her wealthier peers. This association changes her from a good-natured girl into an insufferable snob. Ashamed to admit that her father is merely a concessionaire, May even lets Jane believe Colonel Banks is a racing man when Jane glimpses an envelope stamped “Col. Banks Kentucky Derby.”

Jane's “sweet papa,” Walt Keene, a lounge lizard seeking a “money marriage,” immediately transfers his affections to May, believing her to be wealthy. His ardent wooing sweeps May off her feet, and they become engaged—much to Jane's jealous fury.

At the end of the school term, May returns to New York accompanied by Jane, Alice, and Walt. Jim and Colonel Banks await her at the station but receive only a cold, snobbish glance from “the little snob.” Embarrassed, May quickly hails a taxi to Coney Island.

Back home, May's frosty greeting infuriates Jim. She announces plans to spend the weekend at Alice's home, away from the carnival atmosphere. At the weekend party, May nearly confesses her background to Walt but holds back, fearing she'll lose him. A joyride in Jane's car takes the group toward Coney Island. Though reluctant to leave the car, May is teased into joining the carnival crowd, rubbing elbows with the “great unwashed.”

Their stroll brings them to Colonel Banks's Kentucky Derby concession, where Jane spots the electric sign bearing his name. Outraged, Jane accuses May of being the concession owner's daughter. Jim and Colonel Banks watch anxiously—will May deny her father to impress these new friends?

Walt grabs May's arm, demanding she deny the truth. But May realizes that love for one's family means more than social status. Proudly, she admits, “Yes, that man is my father, and I am proud of it.” Walt shoves her aside, revealing he only loved her for the wealth she pretended to have.

Determined to prove her loyalty, May leaps upon Colonel Banks's platform and starts “barking” to the crowd, showing she is not ashamed of her roots. Jane, Alice, and Walt sneer and walk away.

Afterward, May rushes to her father's nearby apartment, followed by Walt—who came to demand his ring back. She hopes for forgiveness, but Walt coldly warns her, “Don’t be a fool. I’m here to get my ring, but I’ll teach you to play with fire, you little carnival trollop.” May screams for help.

Jim bursts in and delivers Walt the thrashing of his life. When Colonel Banks returns, peace is restored. May and Jim happily plan their future together. The little snob has been tamed, and she is once again “May of Coney Island.”

== Cast ==
- May McAvoy as May Banks
- Robert Frazer as Jim Nolan
- Alec B. Francis as Colonel Banks
- Virginia Lee Corbin as Jane
- Frances Lee as Alice
- John Miljan as Walt Keene

== Preservation ==
An incomplete version of this film is preserved at the UCLA Film & Television Archive.

== See also ==
- List of early sound feature films (1926–1929)
