= Never Say Die (1924 film) =

1924 silent film

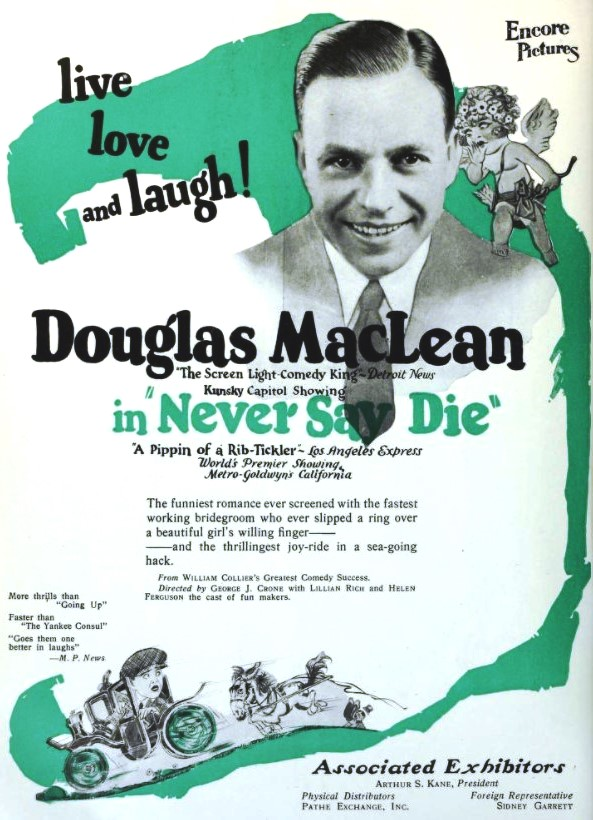
- Directed by: George Crone
- Written by: Raymond Griffith; Wade Boteler; Raymond Cannon
- Based on: Never Say Die by William Collier Sr. and William H. Post
- Produced by: Douglas MacLean
- Starring: Douglas MacLean; Lillian Rich; Helen Ferguson
- Cinematography: Jack MacKenzie
- Production company: Douglas MacLean Productions
- Distributed by: Associated Exhibitors
- Release date: August 31, 1924
- Running time: 60 minutes
- Country: United States
- Language: Silent (English intertitles)

Never Say Die is a 1924 American silent comedy film directed by George Crone and starring Douglas MacLean, Lillian Rich, and Helen Ferguson. The film is based on the play of the same name by American playwright William H. Post.

== Plot ==
Millionaire Jack Woodbury is given one month to live by his doctors and agrees to marry a penniless woman so she can inherit his fortune after his death.

== Cast ==
- Douglas MacLean as Jack Woodbury
- Lillian Rich as Violet Stevenson
- Helen Ferguson as La Cigale
- Hallam Cooley as Hector Walters
- Lucien Littlefield as Griggs
- Tom O'Brien as Gun Murray
- André Lanoy as Verchesi
- Wade Boteler as Dr. Fraser
- Eric Mayne as Dr. Galesby
- William Conklin as Dr. Gerhardt
- George Cooper as Gaston Gibbs

== Production ==
The film was shot at FBO Studios in Hollywood in March 1924.

== Release ==
Never Say Die was released in August 1924. It was distributed in Germany by Phoebus Film. Its Berlin premiere in Kurfürstendamm made headlines in German newspapers after theatregoers booed and caused a disturbance.

== Bibliography ==
- Munden, Kenneth White. The American Film Institute Catalog of Motion Pictures Produced in the United States, Part 1. University of California Press, 1997.
