= Introduce Me =

1925 film

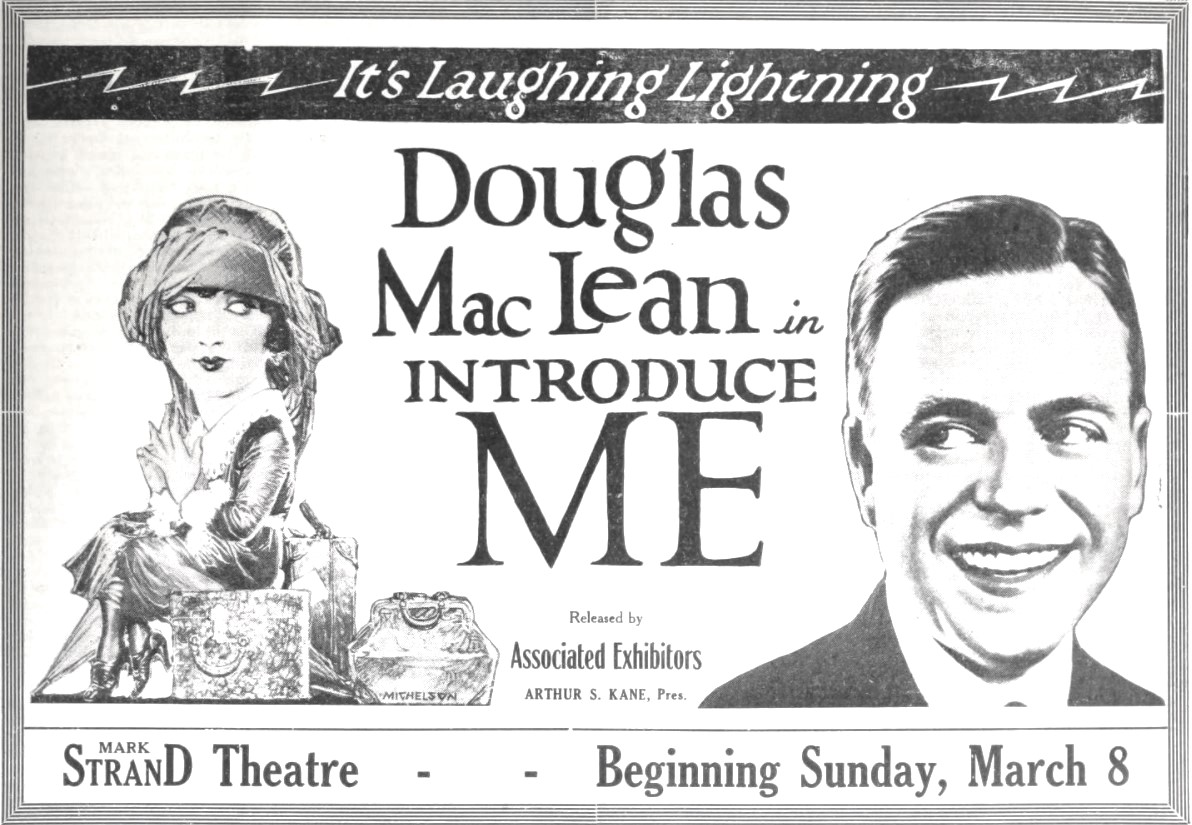
- Advertisement
- Directed by: George J. Crone
- Written by: Wade Boteler (story); Raymond Cannon(scenario)
- Produced by: Douglas MacLean
- Starring: Douglas MacLean
- Cinematography: Jack MacKenzie; Paul Perry
- Distributed by: Associated Exhibitors
- Release date: March 15, 1925
- Running time: 70 mins.
- Country: United States
- Language: Silent (English intertitles)

Introduce Me is a 1925 American silent comedy film directed by George J. Crone and produced by and starring Douglas MacLean. It was released through Associated Exhibitors.

== Plot ==
As described in a film magazine review, Jimmy, sightseeing in France, falls in love with Betty at the railroad station. His friend Algy double-crosses him for the love of the young woman. Jimmy has to steal a ticket to get on the train, and all are off for Switzerland. There, Jimmy is mistaken for the expert mountain climber Roberts. Betty is introduced to him and believes him to be the champion. The real Roberts appears, and Jimmy discovers that Roberts is the man whose tickets he stole. Roberts is angry and declares that Jimmy must climb the highest mountain there or he will expose him as a thief. Jimmy starts climbing, and a bear chases him to the top. Climbing down, he rolls part of the way and creates a giant snowball. Betty's love for him culminates in a betrothal.

== Cast ==
- Douglas MacLean as Jimmy Clark
- Robert Ober as Algy Baker
- E. J. Ratcliffe as John Perry
- Anne Cornwall as Betty Perry
- Lee Shumway as J. K. Roberts
- Wade Boteler as Bruno

== Preservation ==
An incomplete print of Introduce Me survives with another print at Gosfilmofond.
