= The Hun Within =

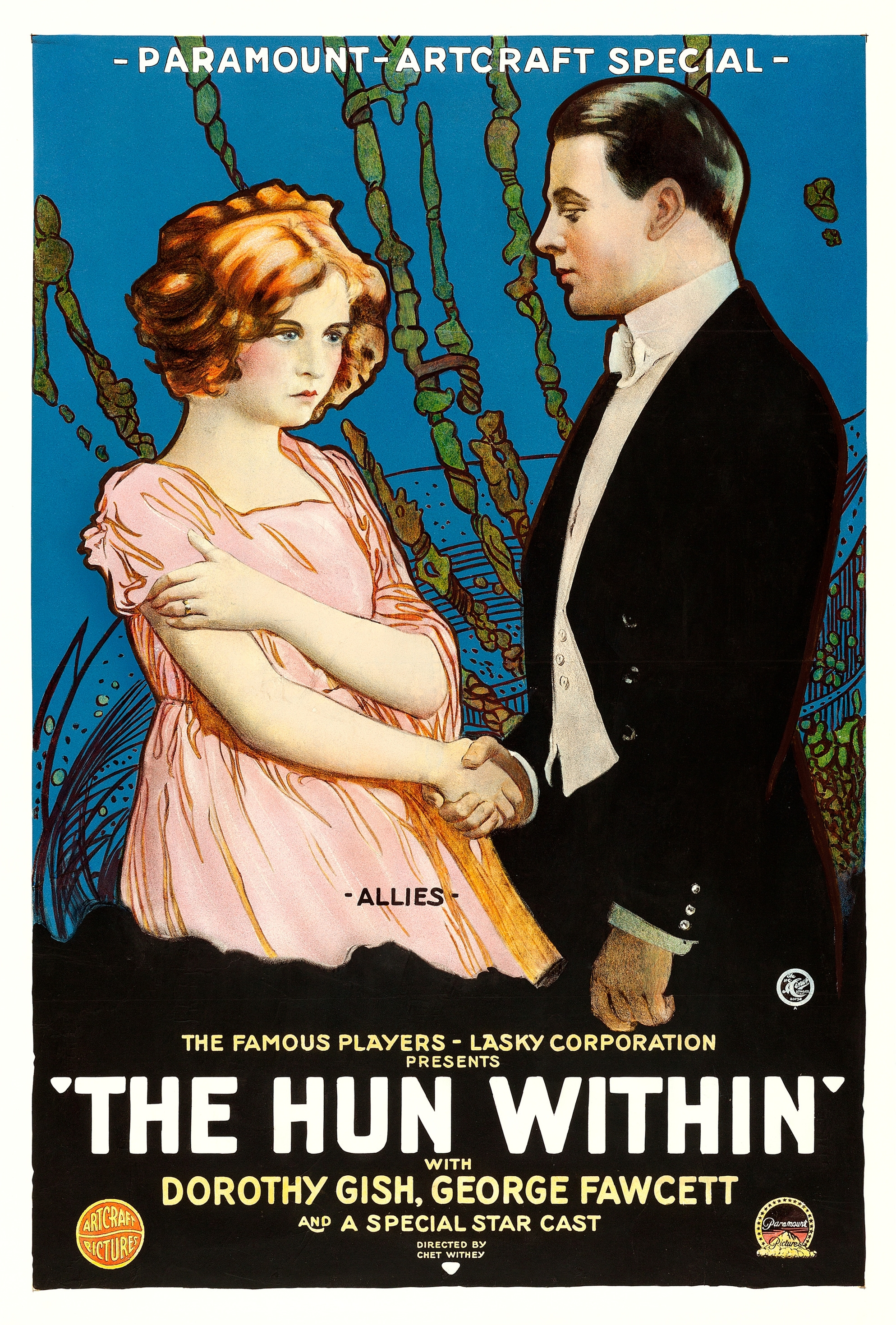
- Theatrical release poster
- Directed by: Chester Withey
- Written by: D. W. Griffith (as Granville Warwick)
- Screenplay by: Stanner E.V. Taylor
- Story by: Stanner E.V. Taylor
- Starring: Dorothy Gish; George Fawcett
- Cinematography: David Abel
- Production company: F-4 Picture Corp.
- Distributed by: Famous Players–Lasky
- Release date: August 25, 1918
- Running time: 5 reels; 50 minutes
- Country: United States
- Languages: Silent film (English intertitles)

The Hun Within is a 1918 American silent war drama thriller film directed by Chester Withey and starring Dorothy Gish and George Fawcett. It was written by historic Biograph directors D. W. Griffith and Stanner E.V. Taylor.

== Cast ==
- Dorothy Gish as Beth
- George Fawcett as Henry Wagner
- Charles K. Gerrard as Karl Wagner
- Douglas MacLean as Frank Douglas
- Herbert Sutch as Krippen (*as Bert Sutch)
- Max Davidson as Max
- Lillian Clark as Leone (*as Lillian Clarke)
- Robert Anderson as Krug
- Erich von Stroheim as Von Bickel
- Adolph Lestina as Beth's Father
- Kate Bruce as Kate's Mother

== Description ==
"Nothing is sacred to the German spy in our midst love, honor or the sanctity of the home; and so the American-born son of a German American father became a Hun, while the father stood up for his adopted country."

== Preservation status ==
- A copy is preserved at the Cinémathèque française.
