= Good as Gold (film) =

1927 film

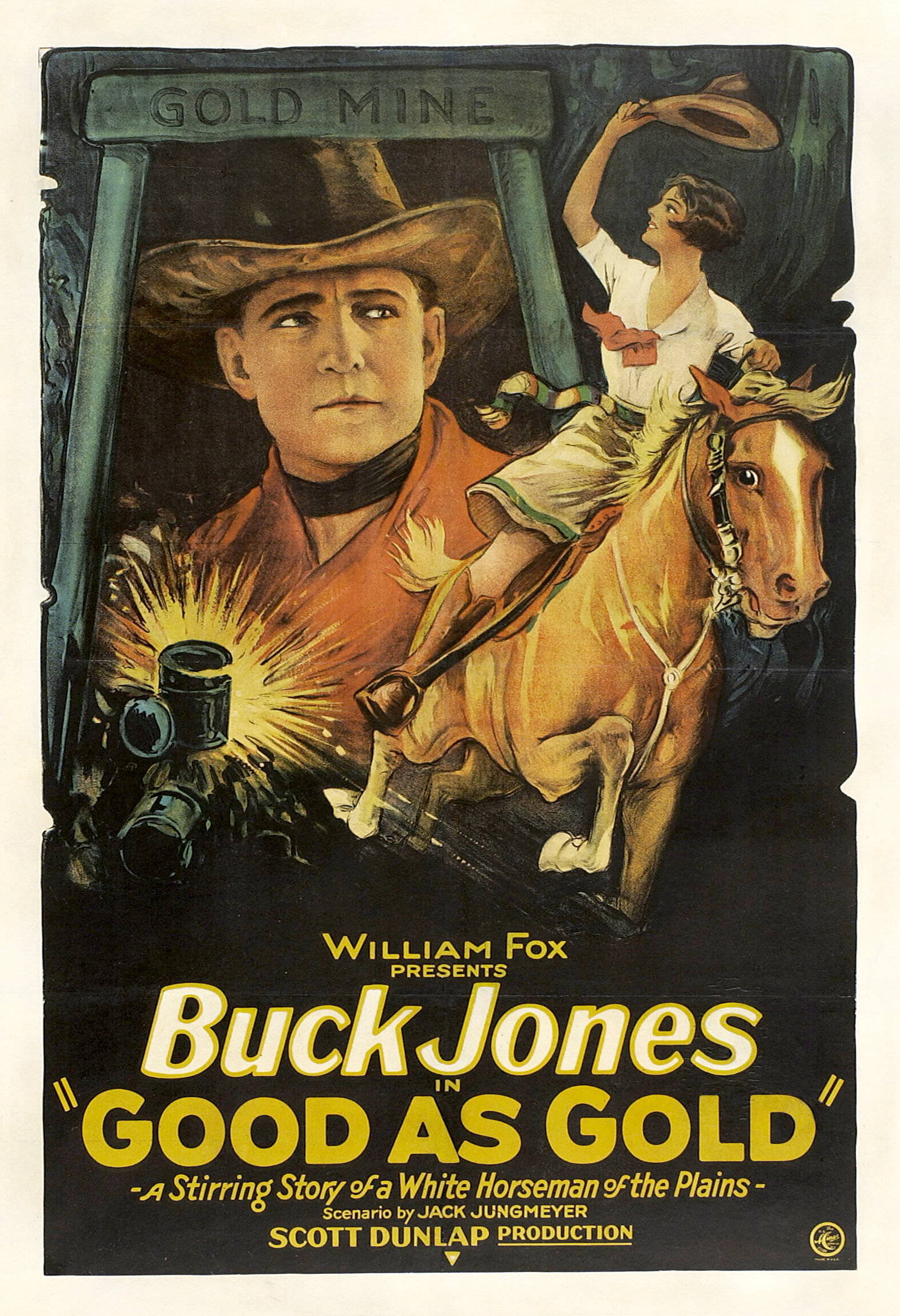
- Theatrical release poster
- Directed by: Scott R. Dunlap
- Screenplay by: Jack Jungmeyer
- Based on: The Owner of the Aztec by Murray Leinster
- Starring: Buck Jones; Frances Lee; Carl Miller; Charles K. French; Adele Watson; Arthur Ludwig
- Cinematography: Reginald Lyons
- Production company: Fox Film Corporation
- Distributed by: Fox Film Corporation
- Release date: June 12, 1927
- Running time: 50 minutes
- Country: United States
- Languages: Silent; English intertitles

Good as Gold is a 1927 American silent Western film directed by Scott R. Dunlap and written by Jack Jungmeyer. The film stars Buck Jones, Frances Lee, Carl Miller, Charles K. French, Adele Watson and Arthur Ludwig. The film was released on June 12, 1927, by Fox Film Corporation.

== Cast ==
- Buck Jones as Buck Brady
- Frances Lee as Jane Laurier
- Carl Miller as Thomas Tilford
- Charles K. French as Sheriff John Gray
- Adele Watson as Timothea
- Arthur Ludwig as Henchman
- Mickey Moore as Buck Brady as a child
