= Going Up (film) =

1923 film

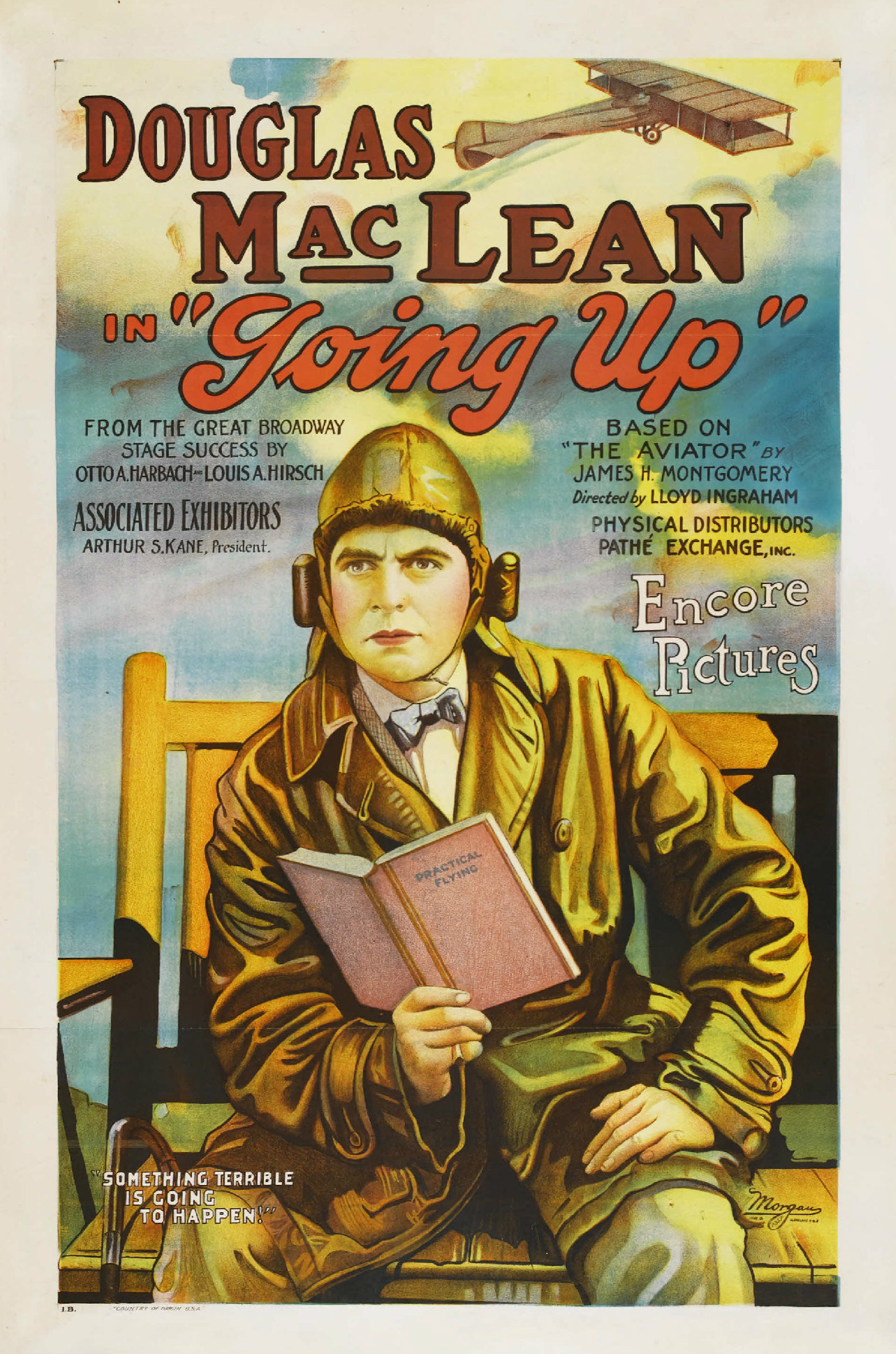
- Directed by: Lloyd Ingraham
- Written by: Raymond Griffith; Otto A. Harbach; Louis A. Hirsch
- Based on: The Aviator by James Montgomery
- Produced by: Douglas MacLean
- Starring: Douglas MacLean; Hallam Cooley; Marjorie Daw
- Cinematography: Ross Fisher
- Production company: Douglas MacLean Productions
- Distributed by: Associated Exhibitors
- Release date: September 30, 1923
- Running time: 60 minutes
- Country: United States
- Languages: Silent; English intertitles

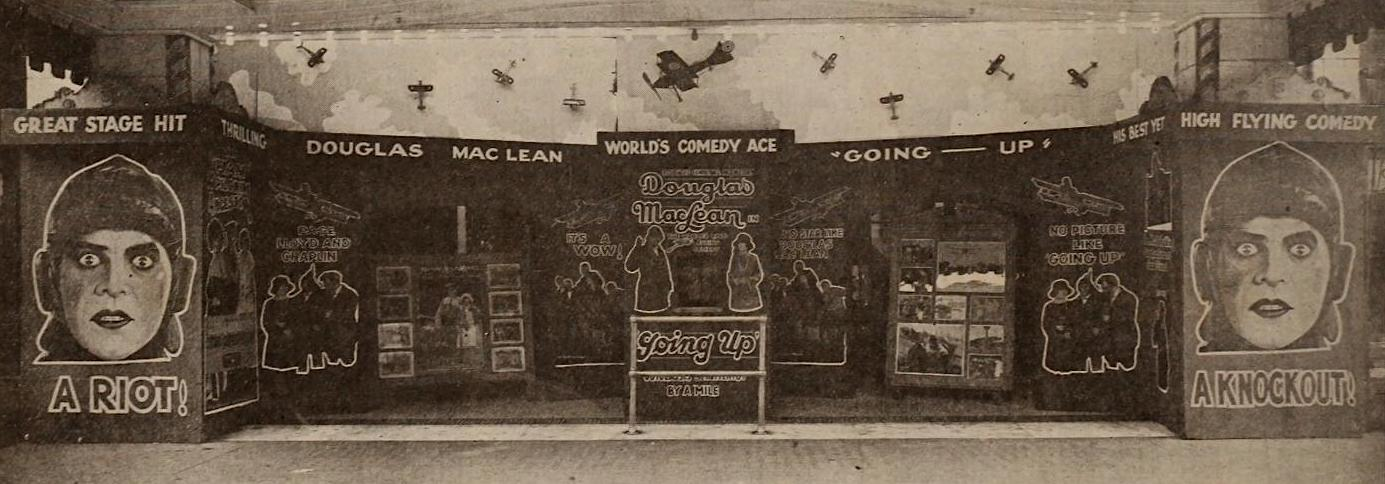
A contemporary cinema lobby decorated for the film

Going Up is a 1923 American silent comedy film directed by Lloyd Ingraham and starring Douglas MacLean, Hallam Cooley and Marjorie Daw. It was based on a 1917 comedy Broadway play The Aviator.

== Plot ==
The author of a series of bestselling novels about aviation has falsely gained a reputation as an expert pilot, despite having a phobia of planes and no real experience. However, when he is challenged by a genuine expert to a race with a rival in love, he accepts and triumphs.

== Cast ==
- Douglas MacLean as Robert Street
- Hallam Cooley as Hopkinson Brown
- Arthur Stuart Hull as James Brooks
- Francis McDonald as Jules Gaillard
- Hughie Mack as Sam Robinson
- Wade Boteler as John Gordon
- John Steppling as William Douglas
- Mervyn LeRoy as The Bellboy
- Marjorie Daw as Grace Douglas
- Edna Murphy as Madeline Manners
- Lillian Langdon as Mrs. Douglas

== Preservation ==
With no prints of Going Up located in any film archives, it is considered a lost film.

== Bibliography ==
- Munden, Kenneth White. The American Film Institute Catalog of Motion Pictures Produced in the United States, Part 1. University of California Press, 1997.
