= Divorce Made Easy =

1929 film by Neal Burns

- Directed by: Neal Burns; Walter Graham
- Screenplay by: Alfred A. Cohn; Wilson Collison; Garrett Graham
- Produced by: Al Christie
- Starring: Douglas MacLean; Marie Prevost; Johnny Arthur; Frances Lee; Dot Farley; Jack Duffy
- Cinematography: Gus Peterson; Alex Phillips; William Wheeler
- Production company: Christie Film Company
- Distributed by: Paramount Pictures
- Release date: July 6, 1929
- Running time: 60 minutes
- Country: United States
- Language: English

Divorce Made Easy is a 1929 American Pre-Code sound comedy film directed by Neal Burns and Walter Graham and written by Alfred A. Cohn, Wilson Collison, and Garrett Graham. The film stars Douglas MacLean, Marie Prevost, Johnny Arthur, Frances Lee, Dot Farley, and Jack Duffy. The film was released on July 6, 1929, by Paramount Pictures.

== Cast ==
- Douglas MacLean as Billy Haskell
- Marie Prevost as Mabel Deering
- Johnny Arthur as Percy Deering
- Frances Lee as Eileen Stanley
- Dot Farley as Aunt Emma
- Jack Duffy as Uncle Todd
- Buddy Wattles as Jerry
- Hal Wilson as Parkins

== Music ==
The film features a theme song entitled “So Sweet” which was composed by Sterling Sherwin. The song is played as a dance number by Earl Burtnett and his orchestra in the film. The theme song is sung twice; once by Burtnett's Biltmore Trio and another time by Marie Prevost.

== See also ==
- List of early sound feature films (1926–1929)
