= The Night Bride =

1927 film

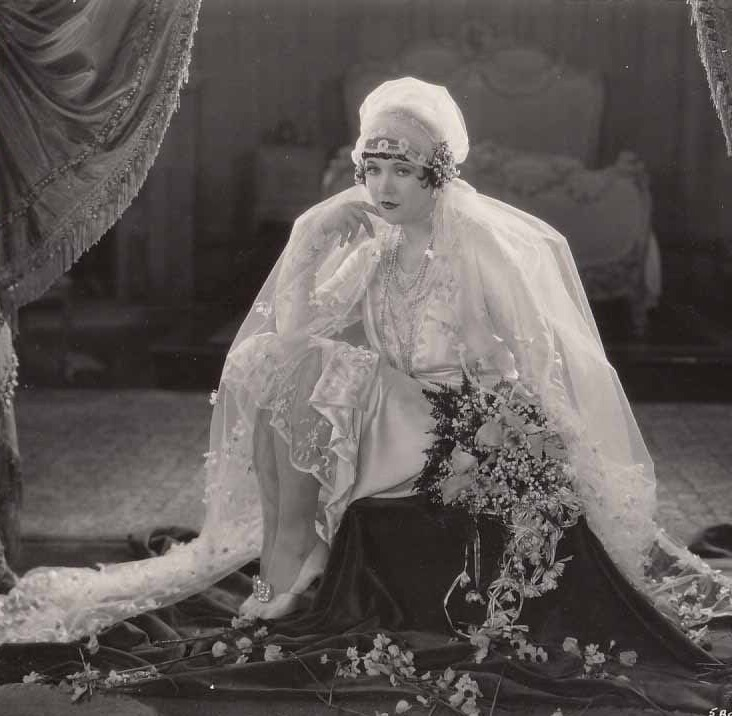
- Film still
- Directed by: E. Mason Hopper
- Written by: Frederick Chapin; Zelda Sears; Fred Stanley
- Produced by: John C. Flinn; F. McGrew Willis
- Starring: Marie Prevost; Harrison Ford; Franklin Pangborn
- Cinematography: Dewey Wrigley
- Production company: Metropolitan Pictures Corporation of California
- Distributed by: Producers Distributing Corporation
- Release date: March 28, 1927
- Running time: 60 minutes
- Country: United States
- Language: Silent (English intertitles)

The Night Bride is a 1927 American silent comedy film directed by E. Mason Hopper and starring Marie Prevost, Harrison Ford, and Franklin Pangborn.

== Cast ==
- Marie Prevost as Cynthia Stockton
- Harrison Ford as Stanley Warrington
- Franklin Pangborn as John Stockton
- Robert Edeson as Adolphe Biggles
- Constance Howard as Renée Stockton
- Richard Crawford as Addison Walsh
- George Kuwa as Japanese Gardner

== Preservation ==
Prints of The Night Bride are located in the collections of the Museum of Modern Art and Centre national du cinéma et de l'image animée.

== Bibliography ==
- Munden, Kenneth White. The American Film Institute Catalog of Motion Pictures Produced in the United States, Part 1. University of California Press, 1997.
