= Wade Boteler =

American actor (1888–1943)

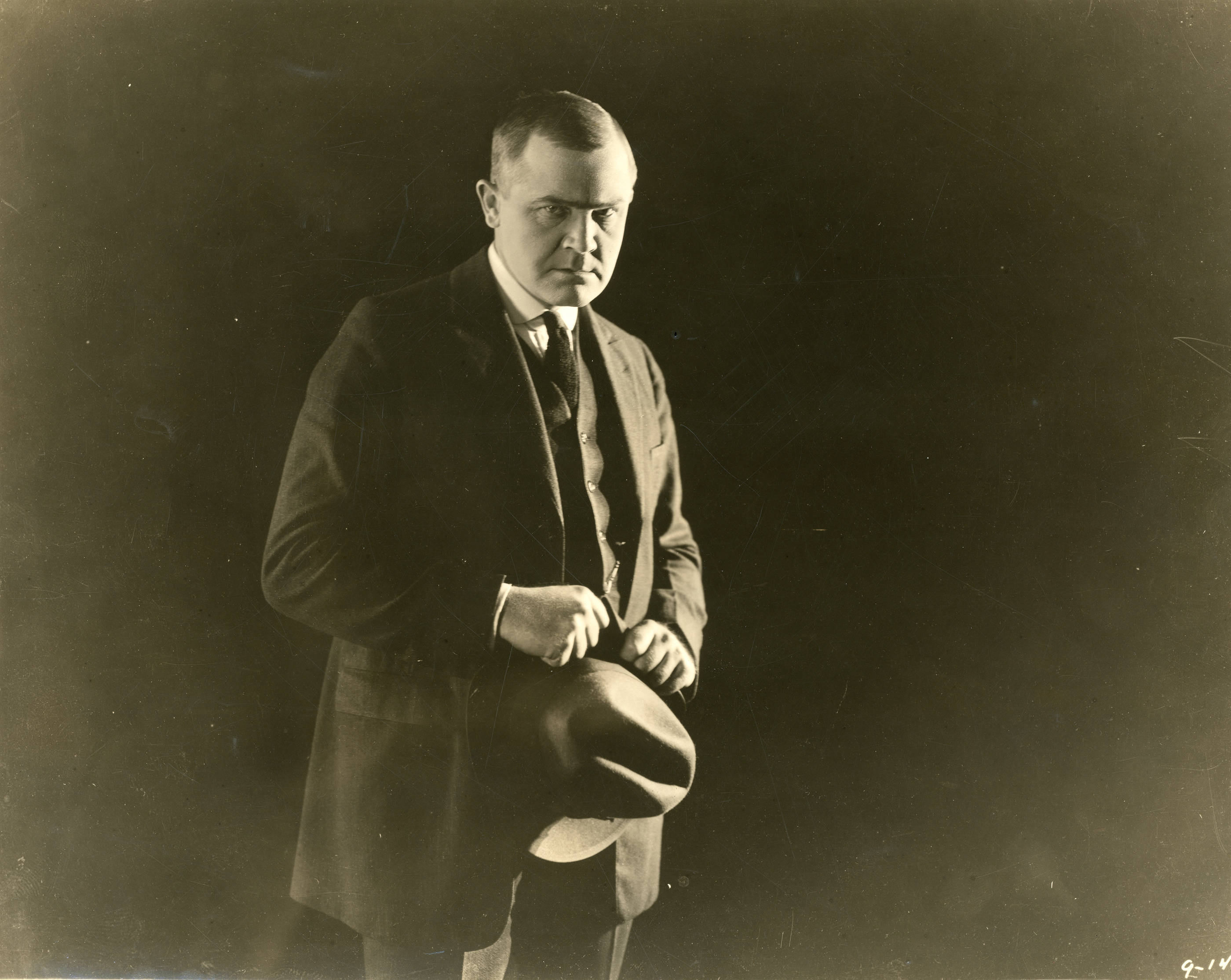
- Boteler in 1921
- Born: October 3, 1888; Santa Ana, California, U.S.
- Died: May 7, 1943 (aged 54); Hollywood, California, U.S.
- Years active: 1919–1943
- Spouse(s): Ellen Evelyn James (1918 – May 7, 1943); 4 children

Wade Boteler (October 3, 1888 – May 7, 1943) was an American film actor and writer. He appeared in more than 430 films between 1919 and 1943.

== Biography ==
He was born in Santa Ana, California, and died in Hollywood, California, from a heart attack.

Boteler graduated from the American Academy of Dramatic Arts. After he graduated, he stayed there as a director until he joined the Army in World War I. For three years in the mid-1920s, he worked for Douglas MacLean's film company as both actor and writer.

On Broadway, Boteler appeared in the play The Silent Voice (1914).

== Partial filmography ==
- The False Road (1920)
- Lahoma (1920)
- An Old Fashioned Boy (1920)
- She Couldn't Help It (1920)
- Ducks and Drakes (1921)
- The Home Stretch (1921)
- Fifty Candles (1921)
- One Man in a Million (1921)
- Blind Hearts (1921)
- At the Sign of the Jack O'Lantern (1922)
- Deserted at the Altar (1922)
- Don't Shoot (1922)
- The Lying Truth (1922)
- The Woman's Side (1922)
- Ridin' Wild (1922)
- Around the World in Eighteen Days (1923)
- The Social Buccaneer (1923)
- The Ghost Patrol (1923)
- Going Up (1923)
- A Man of Action (1923)
- Hit and Run (1924)
- Through the Dark (1924)
- Never Say Die (1924)
- Capital Punishment (1925)
- Introduce Me (1925)
- Jimmie's Millions (1925)
- Marriage in Transit (1925)
- Havoc (1925)
- Seven Keys to Baldpate (1925)
- The Last Edition (1925)
- Hold That Lion (1926)
- That's My Baby (1926)
- Let It Rain (1927)
- Soft Cushions (1927)
- The Baby Cyclone (1928)
- Top Sergeant Mulligan (1928)
- The Crash (1928)
- A Woman Against the World (1928)
- Warming Up (1928) (uncredited)
- The Toilers (1928)
- The Flying Fleet (1929)
- The Godless Girl (1929) (uncredited)
- Navy Blues (1929)
- The Leatherneck (1929)
- Dynamite (1929)
- Soldiers and Women (1930)
- The Devil's Holiday (1930)
- Midnight Daddies (1930)
- The Way of All Men (1930)
- 24 Hours (1931)
- Possessed (1931) (uncredited)
- The Painted Desert (1931)
- Manhattan Tower (1932)
- The Strange Love of Molly Louvain (1932)
- The Death Kiss (1932)
- Speed Demon (1932)
- Come on Danger! (1932)
- Speed Madness (1932)
- End of the Trail (1932)
- Hello, Sister! (1933)
- Advice to the Lovelorn (1933)
- The Kennel Murder Case (1933) (uncredited)
- Duck Soup (1933) (uncredited)
- Queen Christina (1933) (uncredited)
- Hold Your Man (1933) (uncredited)
- Unknown Valley (1933)
- A Man's Game (1934)
- Among the Missing (1934)
- Black Fury (1935)
- The Headline Woman (1935)
- Society Doctor (1935)
- Cheers of the Crowd 1935)
- Streamline Express (1935)
- The Goose and the Gander (1935)
- The Bride Walks Out (1936)
- The Magnificent Brute (1936)
- Charlie Chan at the Circus (1936)
- Alibi for Murder (1936)
- Shakedown (1936)
- Human Cargo (1936)
- It Can't Last Forever (1937)
- The Frame-Up (1937)
- 52nd Street (1937)
- The Marines Are Here (1938)
- Valley of the Giants (1938)
- Youth Takes a Fling (1938)
- The Roaring Twenties (1939) (uncredited)
- The Oklahoma Kid (1939)
- The Green Hornet (1940)
- Ski Patrol (1940)
- Hot Steel (1940)
- Castle on the Hudson (1940)
- Three Faces West (1940)
- The Howards of Virginia (1940)
- Under Texas Skies (1940)
- The Green Hornet Strikes Again! (1941), as Michael Axford, Britt Reid's bodyguard.
- Six Lessons from Madame La Zonga (1941)
- Strange Alibi (1941)
- The Body Disappears (1941)
- Highway West (1941)
- Pacific Blackout (1941)
- Timber (1942)
- The Secret Code (1942)
- I Was Framed (1942)
- Escape from Crime (1942)
- Find the Blackmailer (1943)
- The Last Ride (1944)
