= The Hottentot (1922 film) =

1922 film

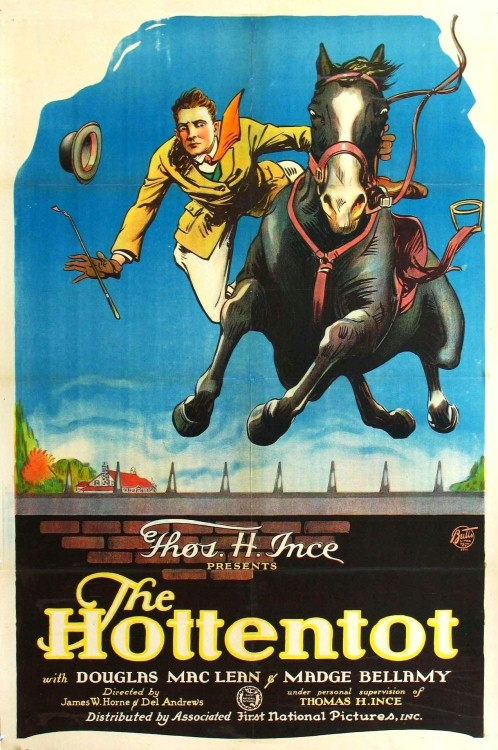
- Film poster
- Directed by: James W. Horne; Del Andrews
- Written by: Del Andrews; Tay Garnett
- Based on: The Hottentot; 1920 play by William Collier Sr. Victor Mapes
- Produced by: Thomas H. Ince
- Starring: Douglas MacLean
- Cinematography: Henry Sharp
- Edited by: LeRoy Stone
- Distributed by: Associated First National
- Release date: December 25, 1922
- Running time: 6 reels
- Country: United States
- Language: Silent (English intertitles)

The Hottentot is a 1922 American silent comedy film directed by James W. Horne and Del Andrews and starred Douglas MacLean. It is based on the 1920 Broadway play The Hottentot by William Collier, Sr. and Victor Mapes. Thomas H. Ince produced the feature with distribution by Associated First National.

The story was remade by Warner Brothers as The Hottentot in 1929 as an early Vitaphone talkie.

Scene from the film

== Cast ==
- Raymond Hatton as Swift
- Madge Bellamy as Peggy Fairfax
- Douglas MacLean as Sam Harrington
- Lila Leslie as Mrs. Carol Chadwick
- Martin Best as Ollie Gilford
- Truly Shattuck as Mrs. May Gilford
- T. D. Crittenden as Major Reggie Townsend (credited as Dwight Crittendon)
- Bert Lindley as McKesson
- Stanhope Wheatcroft as Larry Crawford

== Preservation status ==
It survives incomplete.

== See also ==
- List of films about horses
