= Captain Kidd, Jr. =

1919 film directed by William Desmond Taylor

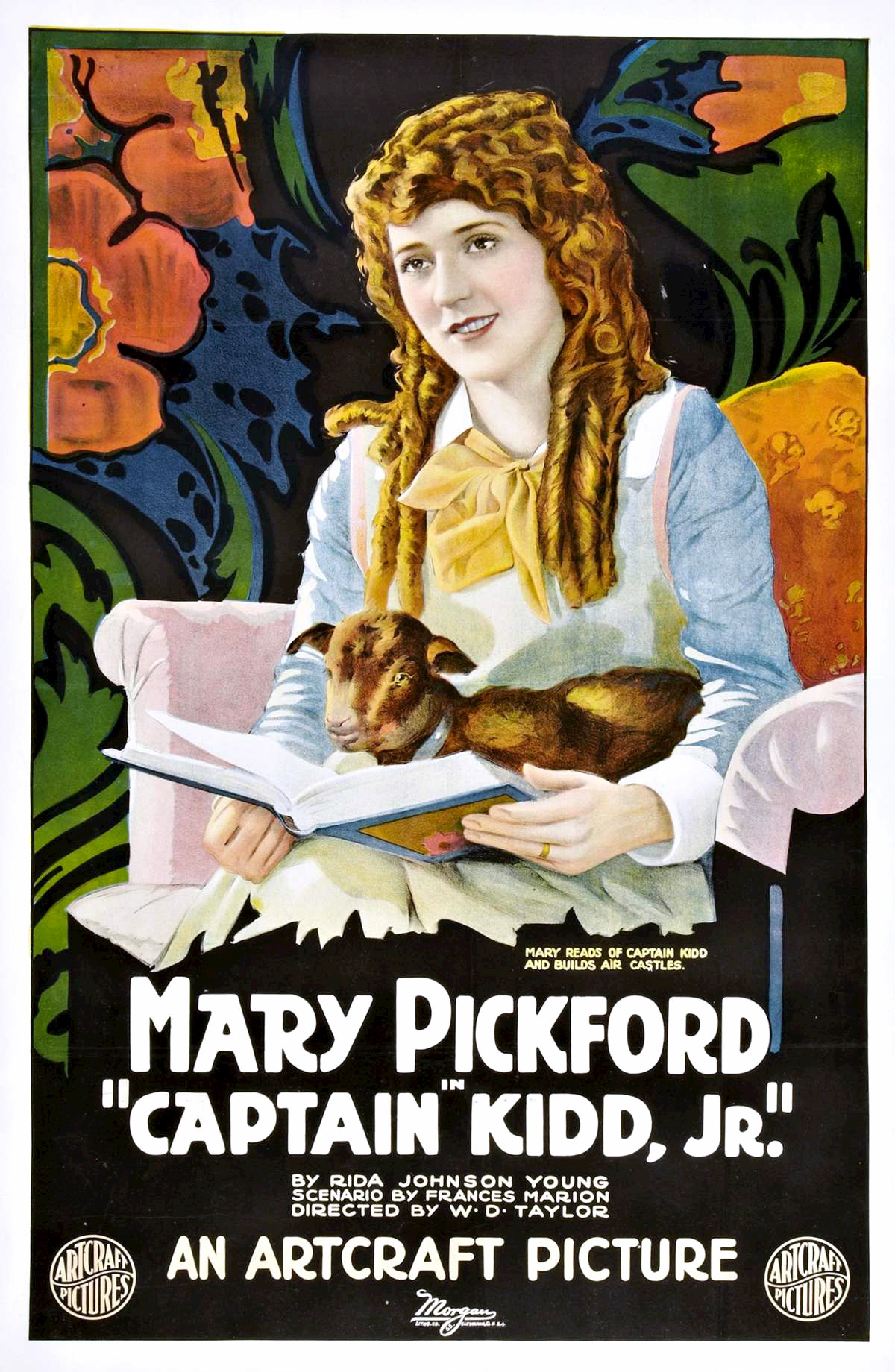
- Directed by: William Desmond Taylor
- Written by: Frances Marion (scenario)
- Based on: Captain Kidd Junior; 1916 play by Rida Johnson Young
- Produced by: Mary Pickford
- Starring: Mary Pickford
- Cinematography: Charles Rosher
- Distributed by: Paramount Pictures
- Release date: April 6, 1919
- Running time: 5 reels
- Country: United States
- Language: Silent (English intertitles)

Captain Kidd, Jr. is a 1919 American silent film produced by and starring Mary Pickford and directed by William Desmond Taylor. It is her last released film for distribution by Paramount Pictures before moving to First National. The film is based on the 1916 play Captain Kidd Junior by Rida Johnson Young. Frequent Pickford collaborator Frances Marion wrote the scenario. This film exists in an incomplete print, with only two of the five reels.

== Plot ==
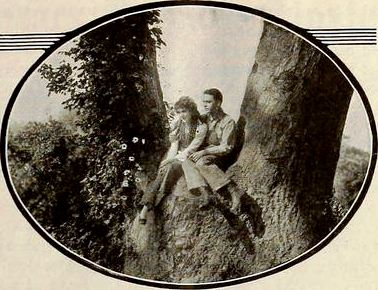
Mary Pickford and Douglas MacLean in the film

As described in a film magazine, the grandfather of Willie Carleton put his will in a book about pirates and buried treasure, and the book is purchased by a second-hand store run by Angus MacTavish, who lives with his granddaughter Mary and a young author named Jim Gleason. After the book comes into the hands of Mary and Jim, a lawyer and the former private secretary for Carleton's grandfather attempt to buy it back, but Mary has found a paper with a map showing where buried treasure may be found. Carleton agrees to share the treasure with the MacTavish crowd if they help find it. It is located at an old farm once owned by the elder Carleton, but now belongs to Lem Butterfield. Pretending to be geologists looking for specimens, they convince the Butterfield to allow them to dig holes all over the place. The suspicions of neighbors and the constable are aroused, and the lawyer and private secretary arrive and attempt to stop the digging. A box is found, and when opened contains a note saying that the treasure mentioned in the will is the good health Willie Carleton will have from all of the exercise spent digging. When they return to the city, it turns out that this was a test as the lawyer has been holding the Carleton fortune in trust. Mary, who bought the farm with money left to her by her mother, sells it for a profit to a man who plans to run a railroad through it. Jim Gleason sells one of his novels to a publisher, and then has the courage to ask Mary a question, which at the end she gives an answer that pleases Jim and they embrace.

== Cast ==
- Mary Pickford - Mary MacTavish
- Douglas MacLean - Jim Gleason
- Spottiswoode Aitken - Angus MacTavish
- Robert Gordon - Willie Carleton
- Winter Hall - John Brent
- Marcia Manon- Marion Fisher
- Victor Potel - Sam, the constable
- Vin Moore - Luella Butterfield
- Clarence Geldart - David Grayson
- William Hutchinson - Lemuel Butterfield
