= The Cruel Truth =

1927 film by Phil Rosen

- Directed by: Phil Rosen
- Written by: Frances Guihan (story & scenario)
- Produced by: Sterling Pictures
- Starring: Hedda Hopper; Constance Howard
- Cinematography: Herbert Kirkpatrick (cinematographer)
- Distributed by: Sterling Pictures (State's Rights distribution)
- Release date: July 10, 1927
- Running time: 6 reels
- Country: United States
- Language: Silent (English intertitles)

The Cruel Truth is a 1927 American silent drama film distributed by the Sterling Pictures company, on a State's Rights concept. It was directed by Phil Rosen and stars Hedda Hopper and Constance Howard. The film is a low budget survivor of the silent era as a print is held by the Library of Congress and the BFI National Film and Television Archive, London.

== Cast ==
- Hedda Hopper as Grace Sturdevant
- Constance Howard as Helen Sturdevant
- Hugh Allan as Reggie Copeley
- Frances Raymond as Mrs. Copeley
- Ruth Handforth as Maid
