= Nugget Nell =

1919 film by Elmer Clifton

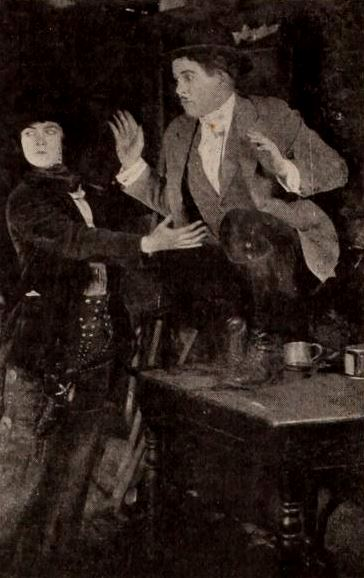
- Still from a film magazine
- Directed by: Elmer Clifton
- Screenplay by: John R. Cornish
- Starring: Dorothy Gish; David Butler; Raymond Cannon; Regina Sarle; Jim Farley; Bob Fleming
- Cinematography: Lee Garmes; John W. Leezer
- Production companies: New Art Film Company; Famous Players–Lasky Corporation
- Distributed by: Paramount Pictures
- Release date: July 27, 1919
- Running time: 50 minutes
- Country: United States
- Language: Silent (English intertitles)

Nugget Nell is a 1919 American comedy silent film directed by Elmer Clifton and written by John R. Cornish. The film stars Dorothy Gish, David Butler, Raymond Cannon, Regina Sarle, Jim Farley, and Bob Fleming. The film was released on July 27, 1919, by Paramount Pictures. It is not known whether the film currently survives.

== Plot ==
As described in a film magazine, Nugget Nell is the proprietress of a stage depot in the early west to her hostelry comes the wealthy and well groomed City Chap, who ignores her love prompted advances. She robs the ladies of the area of their fine clothes and adorns herself for his delectation, but with no results. When he leaves, she learns that the Wolf Gang is planning to hold up the stage and rob him. She in turn robs the gang and frees the City Chap. They are run to cover in a deserted hut where she successfully fights off their pursuers. However, she has learned that City Chap is a coward, so she sends him on his way and goes back to Big Hearted Jim, her faithful admirer.

== Cast ==
- Dorothy Gish as Nugget Nell
- David Butler as Big Hearted Jim
- Raymond Cannon as The City Chap
- Regina Sarle as The Child
- Jim Farley as Badman #1
- Bob Fleming as Badman #2
- Wilbur Higby as Nell's uncle
- Emily Chichester as The Ingenue
