= The Poor Millionaire =

1930 American film

- Directed by: George Melford
- Written by: Henry Lehrman; Rex Taylor
- Produced by: Richard Talmadge
- Starring: Richard Talmadge; Constance Howard; George Irving
- Production company: Richard Talmadge Productions
- Distributed by: Biltmore Pictures
- Release date: April 7, 1930
- Running time: 54 minutes
- Country: United States
- Languages: Silent; English intertitles

The Poor Millionaire is a 1930 pre-Code American silent drama film directed by George Melford and starring Richard Talmadge, Constance Howard, and George Irving. Made after the sound film revolution, it was the last Hollywood film to be released without a soundtrack.

== Plot ==
An escaped convict, the twin brother of a young millionaire, begins to impersonate him and turns his brother's life upside down until he can be confronted.

== Cast ==
- Richard Talmadge as Sidney Thomas / Putt Magee
- Constance Howard as Babs Long
- George Irving as Calvinn Long
- Frederick Vroom as Attorney Wallace
- John Hennings as Peter Cline
- Fanny Midgley as Mrs. Mansford
- Jay Hunt as Butler

== Reception ==
The Film Daily gave the film a scathing review, saying, "Crude production rates among the lowest seen this season, with amateurish directing and acting. Here is one which looks as if it had been made over the weekend."

== Bibliography ==
- Lopez, David (1993). Films by Genre: 775 Categories, Styles, Trends, and Movements Defined, with a Filmography for Each. McFarland & Company.
