= Soft Cushions =

1927 film

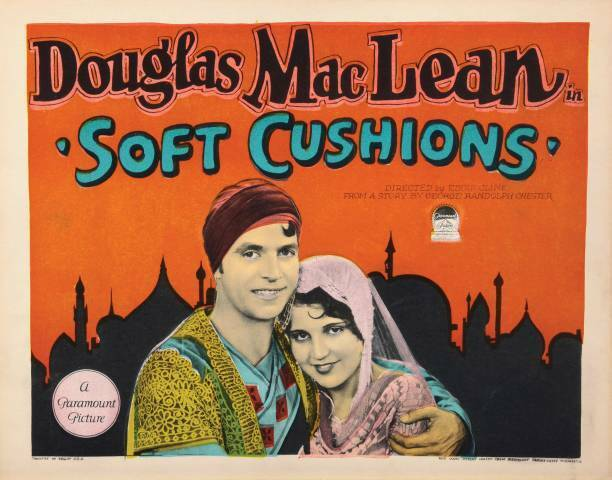
- Directed by: Edward F. Cline
- Written by: Wade Boteler; Frederick Chapin; George Randolph Chester
- Starring: Douglas MacLean; Sue Carol
- Cinematography: Jack MacKenzie
- Distributed by: Paramount Pictures
- Release date: August 27, 1927
- Running time: 70 minutes
- Country: United States
- Language: Silent with English intertitles

Soft Cushions is a 1927 American comedy film directed by Edward F. Cline and featuring Boris Karloff. It is a comic take by actor and producer Douglas MacLean on the 1911 play Kismet and the 1920 silent film adaptation. It is listed as being lost by Arne Andersen's Lost Film Files website.

== Cast ==
- Douglas MacLean as The Young Thief
- Sue Carol as The Girl
- Richard Carle as The Slave Dealer
- Russ Powell as The Fat Thief (as Russell Powell)
- Frank Leigh as The Lean Thief
- Wade Boteler as The Police Judge
- Nigel De Brulier as The Notary
- Albert Prisco as The Wazir
- Boris Karloff as The Chief Conspirator
- Albert Gran as The Sultan
- Fred Kelsey as Policeman
- Harry L. Fraser as The Citizen (as Harry Jones)
- Noble Johnson as The Captain of the Guard

== See also ==
- Boris Karloff filmography
