= When Love Comes (1922 film) =

1922 film directed by William A. Seiter

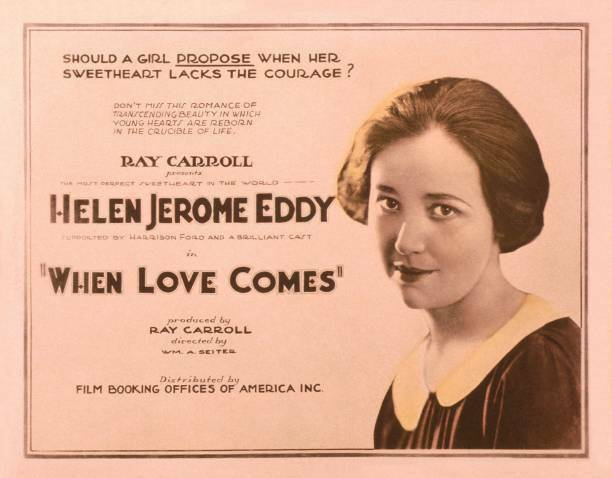
- Directed by: William A. Seiter
- Written by: Ray Carroll; Winifred Dunn
- Produced by: Ray Carroll
- Starring: Helen Jerome Eddy; Harrison Ford; Fanny Midgley
- Cinematography: Lucien N. Andriot
- Production company: Ray Carroll Productions
- Distributed by: Film Booking Offices of America
- Release date: December 10, 1922
- Running time: 60 minutes
- Country: United States
- Language: Silent (English intertitles)

When Love Comes is a 1922 American silent drama film directed by William A. Seiter and starring Helen Jerome Eddy, Harrison Ford, and Fanny Midgley.

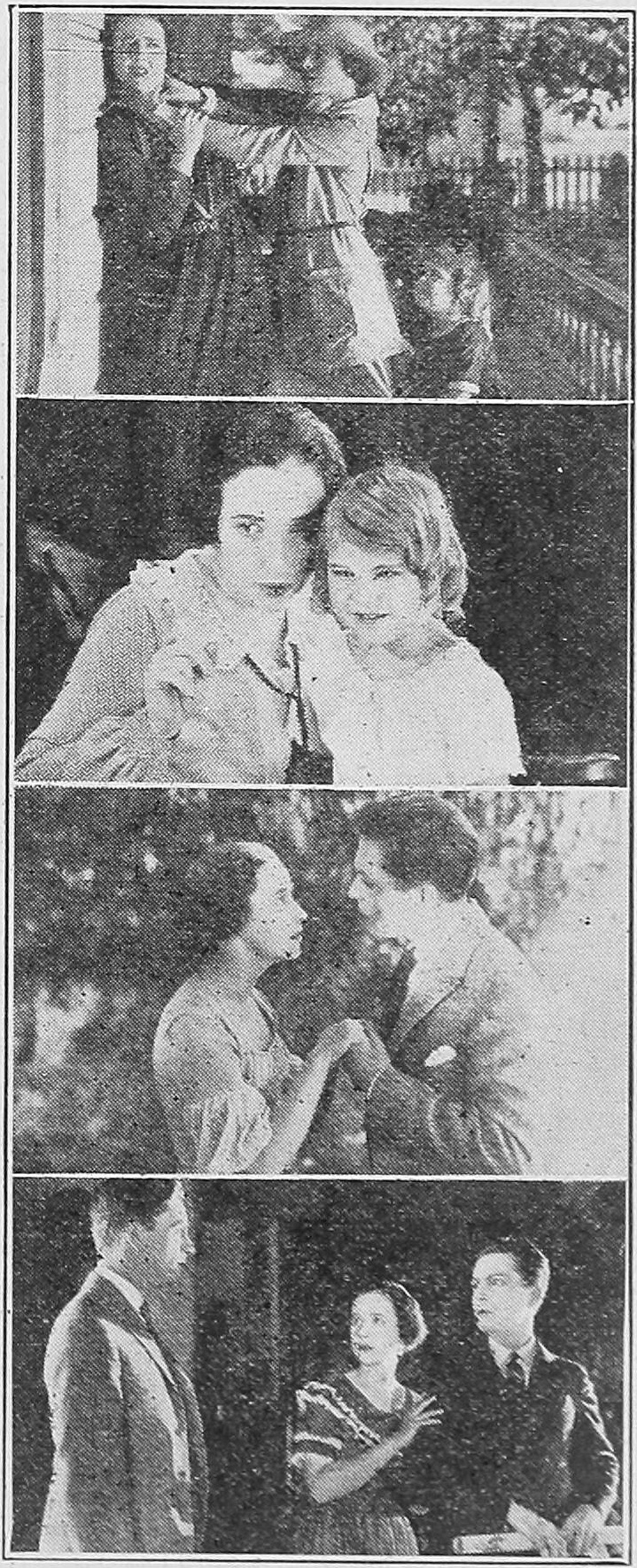
Scenes from the film

== Cast ==
- Helen Jerome Eddy as Jane Coleridge
- Harrison Ford as Peter Jamison
- Fanny Midgley as Aunt Susie Coleridge
- Claire Du Brey as Marie Jamison
- Joseph Bell as Jim Matthews
- Gilbert Clayton as Rufus Terrence
- Buddy Messinger as Coleridge Twin
- Molly Gordon as Coleridge Twin
- James O. Barrows as David Coleridge
- Fay McKenzie as Ruth

== Preservation ==
When Love Comes is currently presumed lost. In February of 2021, the film was cited by the National Film Preservation Board on their Lost U.S. Silent Feature Films list.

== Bibliography ==
- Munden, Kenneth White. The American Film Institute Catalog of Motion Pictures Produced in the United States, Part 1. University of California Press, 1997.
