= Constance Howard (actress) =

American actress

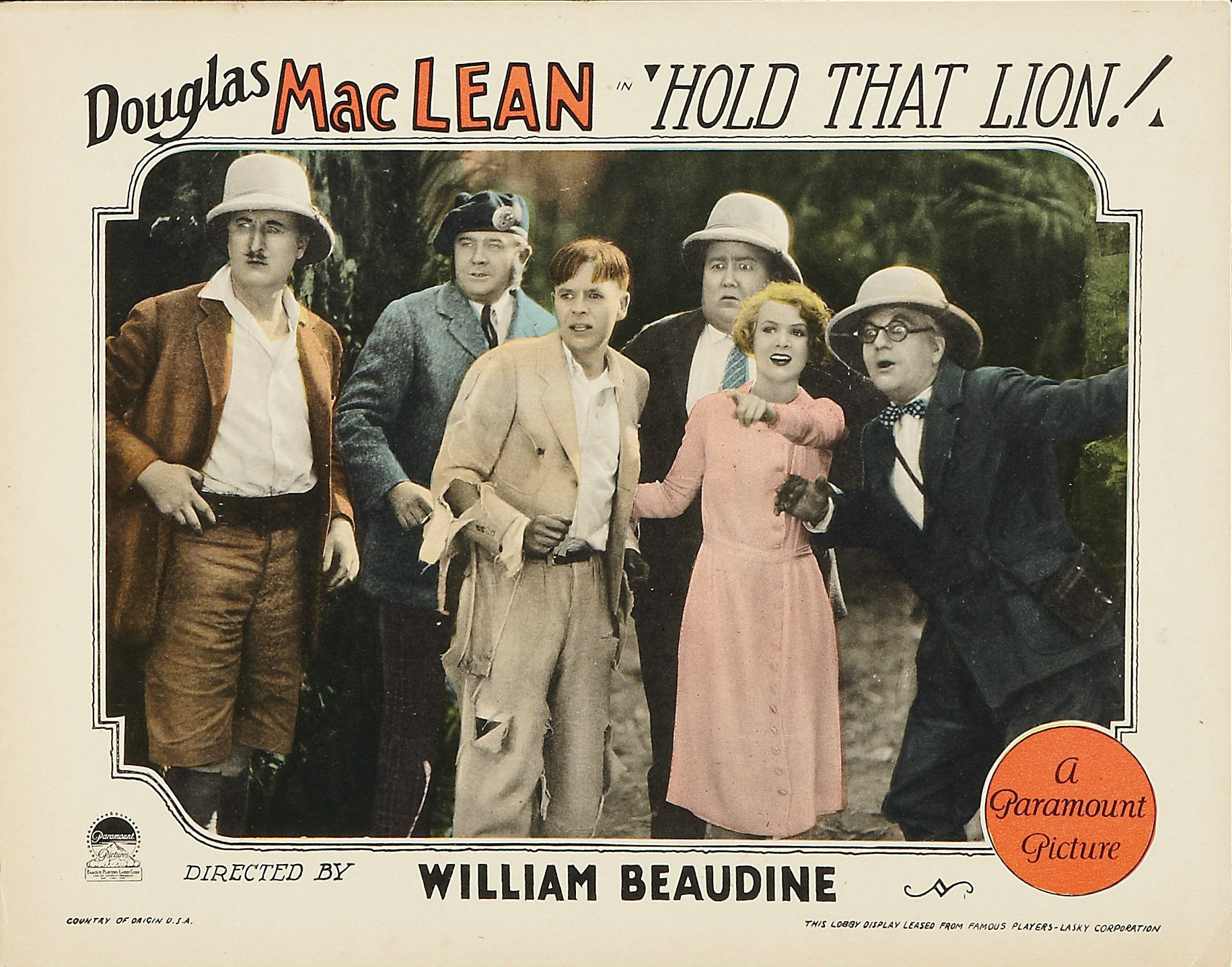
- Lobby card for Hold That Lion (1926)
- Born: October 4, 1906; Omaha, Nebraska
- Died: December 7, 1980 (aged 74); San Diego County, California
- Occupation: Film actress
- Spouse: Wilson S. Jones
- Relatives: Frances Howard, sister

Constance Howard (October 4, 1906 – December 7, 1980) was an American silent film actress of the late 1920s and early 1930s.

Howard was born in Omaha, Nebraska, and her sister was actress Frances Howard.

After acting on stage in New York, Howard was the leading lady when she made her film debut in Hold That Lion (1926).

Howard was married to Wilson S. Jones. She died in San Diego County, California.

== Filmography ==
- Splendor (1935) (uncredited) as Dinner Guest
- The Wedding Night (1935) (uncredited) as Party Guest
- The Poor Millionaire (1930) as Babs Long
- The Smart Set (1928) as Cynthia
- Mother Machree (1928) as Edith Cutting
- The Cruel Truth (1927) as Helen Sturdevant
- The Night Bride (1927) as Renée Stockton
- Women Love Diamonds (1927) as Dorothy Croker-Kelley
- The White Black Sheep (1926) as Enid Gower
- Hold That Lion (1926) as Marjorie Brand
