= Hold That Lion (1926 film) =

1926 film

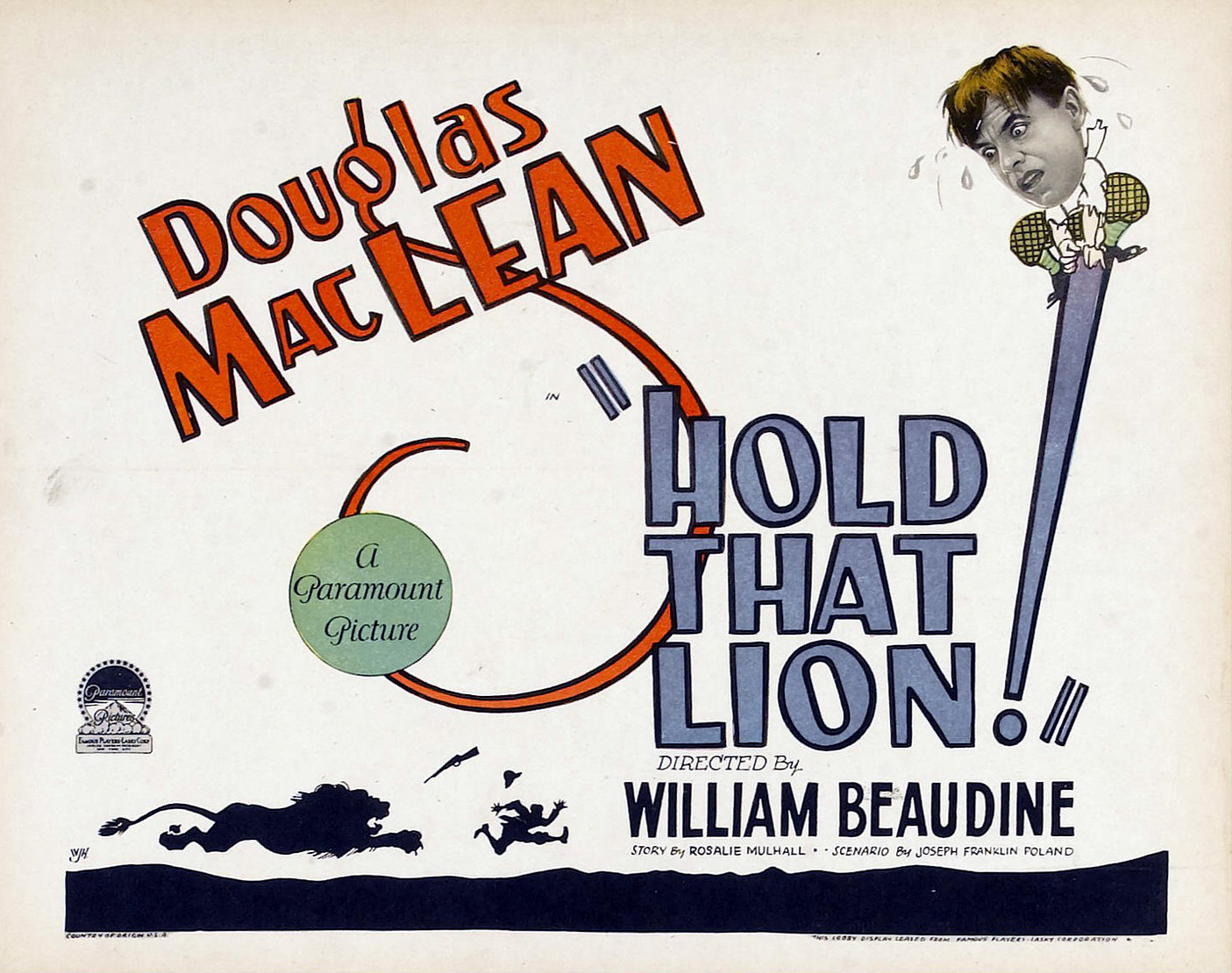
- Lobby card
- Directed by: William Beaudine
- Written by: Joseph Franklin Poland (scenario)
- Story by: Rosalie Mulhall
- Produced by: Adolph Zukor; Jesse Lasky; Douglas MacLean
- Starring: Douglas MacLean
- Cinematography: Jack MacKenzie
- Distributed by: Paramount Pictures
- Release date: September 27, 1926
- Running time: 6 reels
- Country: United States
- Language: Silent (English intertitles)

Hold That Lion is a 1926 American silent comedy film directed by William Beaudine, starring Douglas MacLean, Walter Hiers, and Constance Howard. The film was written by Joseph F. Poland based on a story by Rosalie Mulhall.

== Cast ==
- Douglas MacLean as Jimmie Hastings
- Walter Hiers as Dick Warren
- Constance Howard as Marjorie Brand
- Cyril Chadwick as H. Horace Smythe
- Wade Boteler as Andrew MacTavish
- George C. Pearce as Professor Brand

== Preservation ==
Previously thought lost, the Library of Congress holds this title in addition to the like titled 1947 Three Stooges short.
