= George Crone =

American director and editor

- Born: October 6, 1894; San Francisco, California United States
- Died: June 1966; Ventura, California, United States
- Occupations: Director, editor
- Years active: 1920–1966

George Crone (1894–1966), also known as George J. Crone, was an American director and editor, whose career spanned both the silent and sound film eras. He began his career cutting the silent film Let's Be Fashionable in 1920. Between that film and his final screen credit, editing Arruza (released in 1972), he edited over 40 films, and directed over a dozen more. Arruza was released 6 years after Crone's death. Crone had worked with director Budd Boetticher, on Boetticher's obsession, a docudrama regarding his friend Carlos Arruza, the famous bullfighter. Boetticher had used ten cameras to film 2 of Arruza's bullfights in January and February 1966, and Crone was tasked with editing the different fights together. Crone died shortly after completing the tasks, in June 1966. Earlier in his career, he had been the original editor on Citizen Kane, before being replaced by Robert Wise.

== Filmography ==
(as per AFI's database)

=== As director ===
- Never Say Die (1924) (credited as George J. Crone )
- Introduce Me (1925) (credited as George J. Crone )
- The Floating College (1928) (credited as George J. Crone )
- Así es la vida (1930) (credited as George J. Crone )
- Blaze o' Glory (1930) (credited as George J. Crone )
- Reno (1930) (credited as George J. Crone )
- What a Man (1930) (credited as George J. Crone )
- Hollywood, ciudad de ensueño (1932)
- Get That Girl (1932)
- Speed Madness (1932)
- On Your Guard (1933)

=== As editor ===
- Let's Be Fashionable (1920) (credited as George J. Crone )
- The Girl in the Taxi (1921) (credited as George J. Crone )
- The Yankee Consul (1924) (credited as George J. Crone )
- Flaming Gold (1933)
- Sing and Like It (1934)
- Strictly Dynamite (1934)
- We're Rich Again (1934)
- Gridiron Flash (1934)
- The Richest Girl in the World (1934)
- Old Man Rhythm (1935)
- Hooray for Love (1935)
- Grand Old Girl (1935)
- A Dog of Flanders (1935)
- To Beat the Band (1935)
- Two in the Dark (1936)
- Make Way for a Lady (1936)
- Second Wife (1936)
- Fight for Your Lady (1937)
- New Faces of 1937 (1937)
- Quick Money (1937)
- The Law West of Tombstone (1938)
- Room Service (1938)
- Allegheny Uprising (1939)
- Beauty for the Asking (1939)
- Swiss Family Robinson (1940)
- Wildcat Bus (1940)
- The Gay Falcon (1941)
- A Girl, a Guy and a Gob (1941)
- The Falcon in Danger (1943)
- The Falcon Strikes Back (1943)
- Forever and a Day (1943)
- Gangway for Tomorrow (1943)
- Seven Miles from Alcatraz (1943)
- Rosauro Castro (1950)
- My Outlaw Brother (1951)
- One Big Affair (1952)
- A Life in the Balance (1955)
- Of Love and Desire (1963) - assistant editor
- Arruza (1972)

=== Other roles ===
- Old Dad (1920) - assistant director
- Twin Beds (1920) - assistant director
- My Lady Friends (1921) - assistant director
