= Douglas MacLean =

American actor (1890–1967)

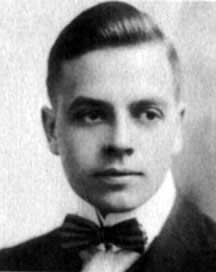
- Often billed as "The Man With the Million Dollar Smile", c. 1915
- Born: Charles Douglas MacLean; January 10, 1890; Philadelphia, Pennsylvania
- Died: July 9, 1967 (aged 77); Los Angeles, California
- Burial place: Forest Lawn Memorial Park
- Spouse(s): Faith Cole (1914–1930); Lorraine Eddy (1931–1936); Barbara Barondess (1938–1948)

Charles Douglas MacLean (January 10, 1890 – July 9, 1967) was an American stage and silent film actor who later worked as a producer and screenwriter in the sound era.

== Early life and stage career ==
Born in Philadelphia, MacLean was educated at Northwestern University and Lewis Institute of Technology, in Chicago. Although he came from a Navy family and was slated for Annapolis, he chose a different career path. After working as a bond salesman, MacLean enrolled in the American Academy of Dramatic Arts and later played juvenile leads in repertory theatre and performed as supporting characters in major stage productions such as Peter Pan starring Maude Adams.

== Film ==
MacLean's first film was the 1914 production As Ye Sow with Alice Brady, followed by bit parts in Fuss and Feathers and in two Mary Pickford features, Captain Kidd, Jr. and Johanna Enlists. He went on to appear with Dorothy Gish in The Hun Within, and he co-starred with Doris May in the romantic comedy 23 1/2 Hours' Leave, which was a big hit. From 1922 to 1929 he starred in 14 other features for Paramount and First National, all maintaining the standard light romantic comedy formula that continued to prove successful for him. MacLean during his film career was often billed as "The Man With the Million Dollar Smile". In 1929 he was cast in his only "talkie", Divorce Made Easy; he then retired from acting.

== Producer and screenwriter ==
In 1932, MacLean made his debut as a producer with Ladies of the Jury. He produced a total of eight films for Paramount, including Tillie and Gus starring W.C. Fields, Ladies Should Listen starring Cary Grant, and Two for Tonight. He retired from film production in 1937 but continued to work as a freelance writer for movies and television during the 1940s and 1950s.

== Personal life and death ==
MacLean married actress Faith Cole while both were performing in stock theater. They divorced in 1930. MacLean married actress Lorraine Eddy on March 3, 1931.

He met his third wife, Barbara Barondess, in a producer's office in April 1932, six years before they wed. At the time they were already aware of each other's work and recognized each other's voices. In her 1986 autobiography One Life is Not Enough, Barondess recalls, "There was something in this man's manner and speech that made an indelible impression on me." She describes him as having a vaulted, almost regal presence:

He was the most elegant man I had ever met. I didn't identify with him in the girl-and-boy sense. He was too far away, on a pedestal, completely out of reach. I would have felt the same way if he had been the Prince of Wales.

MacLean, at age 77, died in 1967 in his Beverly Hills home from the effects of a stroke. His gravesite is located at Forest Lawn Memorial Park in Glendale, California.

== Filmography ==
=== Actor ===
- Divorce Made Easy (1929)
- The Carnation Kid (1929) (*Library of Congress)
- Soft Cushions (1927)
- Let It Rain (1927)
- Hold That Lion (1926)
- That's My Baby (1926)
- Seven Keys to Baldpate (1925)
- Introduce Me (1925)
- Never Say Die (1924)
- The Yankee Consul (1924)
- Going Up (1923)
- A Man of Action (1923)
- The Sunshine Trail (1923)
- Bell Boy 13 (1923) (*Library of Congress)
- The Hottentot (1922)
- Passing Through (1921)
- One a Minute (1921) (*Library of Congress)
- The Home Stretch (1921) (*Library of Congress)
- Chickens (1921)
- The Rookie's Return (1920)
- The Jailbird (1920) (*Library of Congress)
- Let's Be Fashionable (1920)
- Mary's Ankle (1920)
- What's Your Husband Doing? (1920) (*Library of Congress)
- 23 1/2 Hours' Leave (1919)
- Captain Kidd, Jr. (1919)
- The Homebreaker (1919)
- Happy Though Married (1919)
- Fuss and Feathers (1918)
- Mirandy Smiles (1918)
- Johanna Enlists (1918) (*Library of Congress)
- The Hun Within (1918)
- The Vamp (1918)
- The Fair Barbarian (1917)
- Souls in Pawn (1917)
- The Upper Crust (1917)
- A Woman's Power (1916)
- Love's Crucible (1916)
- The Boss (1915)
- The Man Who Found Himself (1915)
- As Ye Sow (1914)

=== Producer ===
- The Great Awakening (1941) also known as New Wine
- Suspect (1940) (stageplay)
- 23 1/2 Hours' Leave (1937)
- Great Guy (1936)
- So Red the Rose (1935)
- Two for Tonight (1935)
- Accent on Youth (1935)
- People Will Talk (1935)
- Mrs. Wiggs of the Cabbage Patch (1934)
- Ladies Should Listen (1934)
- Melody in Spring (1934)
- Six of a Kind (1934)
- Tillie and Gus (1933)
- Secrets of Hollywood (1933)
- Ladies of the Jury (1932)
- Caught Plastered (1931)
- Too Many Cooks (1931)
- Laugh and Get Rich (1931)
- Seven Keys to Baldpate (1925)
- Never Say Die (1924)
- Going Up (1923)

=== Writer ===
- Mama Loves Papa (1945)
- Six of a Kind (1934)
- Mama Loves Papa (1933)
- Caught Plastered (1931)
- Cracked Nuts (1931)
- Laugh and Get Rich (1931)
