= Border Legion =

(The) Border Legion may refer to:

- Border Legion (Shannara), the name of the army of Callahorn in the Shannara series of novels
- The Border Legion, a 1916 novel by Zane Gray
- The Border Legion (1918 film), an American silent Western film
- The Border Legion (1924 film), a lost American silent Western film
- The Border Legion (1930 film), an American pre-Code Western film
- The Border Legion (1940 film), an American Western film
