= Thundering Herd =

Thundering Herd or Thundering herd may refer to:

== Arts and entertainment ==
- The Thundering Herd (novel), by Zane Grey
  - The Thundering Herd (1925 film), a lost 1925 American Western silent film
  - The Thundering Herd (1933 film), a sound remake
- Thundering Herd (album), by Kyle Gass Band
- Thundering Herd, a nickname for several versions of Woody Herman's big band

== Sports ==
- Marshall Thundering Herd, the athletic teams of Marshall University, West Virginia, US
- Thundering Herd, a nickname for the 1920s championship football teams of the University of Southern California, US

=== US high-school teams ===
- A. H. Parker High School, in Birmingham, Alabama
- Carlisle High School (Carlisle, Pennsylvania)
- Elk Grove High School (Elk Grove, California)
- Woodbury Junior-Senior High School, in Woodbury, New Jersey

== Organizations ==
- Merrill Lynch, nickname of the Wall Street firm
- 8th Armored Division (United States) (nickname), that served in World War II

== Other uses ==
- Thundering herd problem, in computing
