= The Release of Dan Forbes =

1916 film by Donald MacDonald

- Directed by: Donald MacDonald
- Starring: Helen Rosson; William Stowell; Harry Van Meter
- Distributed by: Mutual Film
- Release date: May 29, 1916
- Country: United States
- Languages: Silent film English intertitles

The Release of Dan Forbes is a 1916 American silent short drama film directed by Donald MacDonald starring Helen Rosson, William Stowell, and Harry Van Meter.
