= The Border Legion (1918 film) =

1918 film

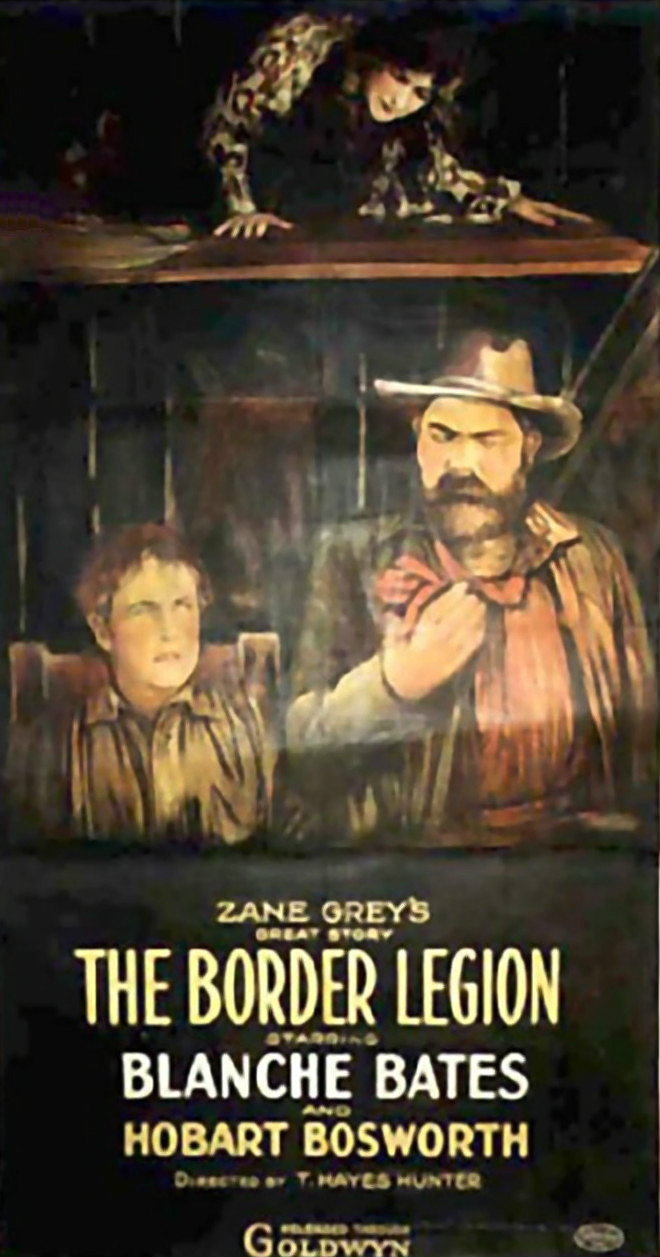
- Film poster
- Directed by: T. Hayes Hunter
- Written by: Victor de Viliers; Lawrence Marston
- Based on: The Border Legion by Zane Grey
- Produced by: Samuel Goldwyn
- Starring: Blanche Bates; Hobart Bosworth; Eugene Strong
- Cinematography: Abe Scholtz
- Edited by: Alex Troffey
- Production company: Goldwyn Pictures
- Distributed by: Goldwyn Pictures
- Release date: August 28, 1918 (USA)
- Running time: 50 minutes 5 reels
- Country: United States
- Languages: Silent; English intertitles

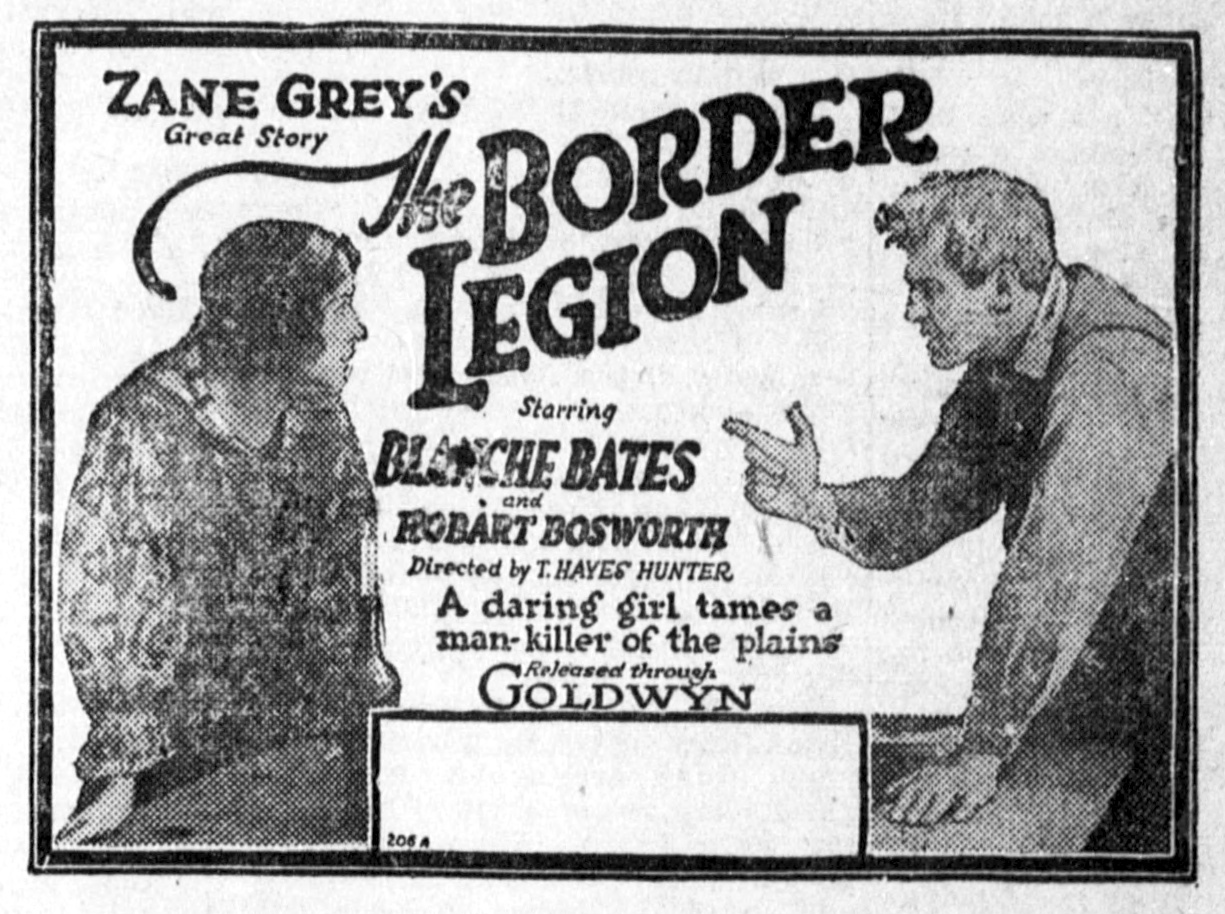
Newspaper Advertisement.

The Border Legion is a 1918 American silent Western film directed by T. Hayes Hunter and starring Blanche Bates, Hobart Bosworth, and Eugene Strong. The film is based on the 1916 novel The Border Legion by Zane Grey. The film marked the screen debut of Blanche Bates. The Border Legion was released on August 28, 1918. Following the acquisition of distribution rights by Goldwyn Pictures, the film was rereleased in the United States on January 19, 1919.

== Plot ==
After Joan Randall accuses her fiancé Jim Cleeve of being a coward, he joins a gang of outlaws called the Border Legion. Feeling guilty about how she treated him, Joan follows after Jim and is soon attacked by gang leader Jack Kells, whom she shoots.

In the coming days, Joan nurses the outlaw back to health, earning his undying gratitude and a promise that he will always protect her. Later, when Jim reclaims her, Jack follows after the couple and threatens him. As the law closes in on the Border Legion, Jack tries to prevent the gang from using Joan as a hostage. During a confrontation, Jack is killed by his own gang. A posse soon arrives and save Joan and Jim.

== Cast ==
- Blanche Bates as Joan Randall
- Hobart Bosworth as Jack Kells
- Eugene Strong as Jim Cleve
- Kewpie Morgan as Gorilla Gulden
- Russell Simpson as Overland Bradley
- Arthur Morrison as Sheriff Roberts
- Bull Montana as Red Pierce
- Richard Souzade as Bate Wood
- Kate Elmore as Mrs. Wood

== Production ==
The Border Legion marked the film debut of stage actress Blanche Bates. The Border Legion was released on August 28, 1918. Following the acquisition of distribution rights by Goldwyn Pictures, the film was rereleased in the United States on January 19, 1919.

== Critical response ==
The reviewer for the New York Times enjoyed the raw quality of the film:

The Border Legion is a Western melodrama of the most undiluted type. Here and there one is disturbed by the injections of some suggestion of the world of today, and Eugene Strong is a little too natty-looking to harmonize with his surroundings, but too-careful analysis should not be applied to a photoplay so frankly wild-and-wooly.

== Adaptations ==
Following this initial film adaptation of Zane Grey's novel The Border Legion, three additional film adaptations were produced by Paramount Pictures. In 1924, a second silent film, The Border Legion, was released, directed by William K. Howard and starring Antonio Moreno and Helene Chadwick. In 1930, the first sound film adaptation was directed by Otto Brower and Edwin H. Knopf, The Border Legion, starring Jack Holt and Fay Wray. Finally in 1934, The Last Round-Up was released, directed by Henry Hathaway and starring Randolph Scott and Barbara Fritchie.

== Preservation ==
With no holdings located in archives, The Border Legion is considered a lost film.
