= The White Rosette =

1916 film by Donald MacDonald

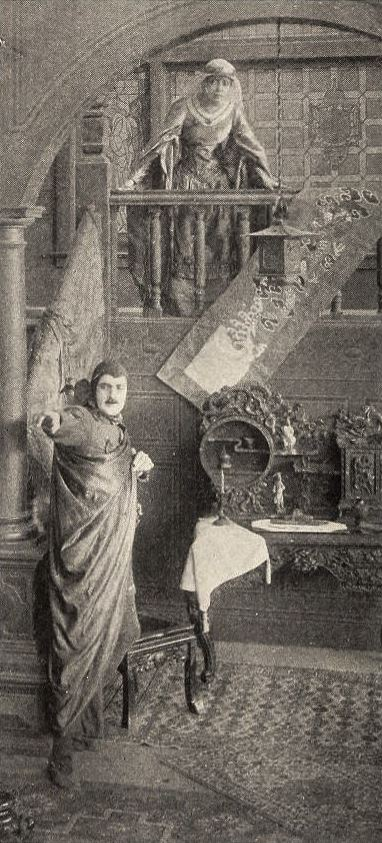
- Film still
- Directed by: Donald MacDonald
- Starring: Eugenie Forde; Helen Rosson; Richard La Reno
- Production company: American Film Manufacturing Company
- Distributed by: Mutual Film
- Release date: February 1, 1916
- Running time: 5 reels
- Country: United States
- Language: Silent (English intertitles)

The White Rosette is a 1916 American silent drama film directed by Donald MacDonald starring Eugenie Forde, Helen Rosson, and Richard La Reno.

== Plot ==
According to a film magazine, "In the romantic days of the Eleventh Century the prologue of this picture shows us, Sir Errol, a victorious knight, returns to the castle of his liege lord, the Baron Edward, where he renews his vows with Lady Maud, his betrothed mistress. During Sir Errol's absence from the realm, the Baron has married Lady Elfrleda, daughter of an impecunious nobleman. Edward loves Elfrleda, but for her the marriage was solely one of expediency. She loses her heart to the handsome young knight. Learning that Errol and Maud are afllanced, Elfrleda banishes her lady-in-waiting by sending Maud home to her father. Sir Longson, a retainer of the Baron's. The lovers meet secretly on the eve of Maud's departure, and she pins over Errol's heart a small, white rosette. He pledges to remain always her true and loyal knight.

No sooner is Maud out of the way than the Baron's bride lays siege to Sir Errol. She plots with Lord Kerrigan and his followers to have the Baron murdered and Errol installed in the baronetcy. The conspiracy finds its way to Lady Maud's ears. On the eve of the night appointed for his death, she determines to warn Edward. Disguised as a maiden knight, she reaches the Baron's chamber — just too late. Maud is fatally wounded by the assassins. On recognizing his dead love. Sir Errol, renounces the Lady Elfrleda, and plucking the white rosette from his breast, swears on the hilt of his sword that he will atone for his dishonored life, be it now or a thousand years to come.

The picture then introduces us to Pierpont Carewe, a railroad magnate, whose wife, Frieda, has married him solely for his wealth. Thomas Eric, a young civil engineer in Carewe's employ, returns to New York after a successful survey for a new road, and Carewe rewards him with a block of stock in the company. Frieda falls in love with Eric. The young engineer already is engaged to be married to Joan Long, daughter of Carewe's head engineer. Frieda schemes to get the Longs exiled to Bermuda, and then plots with Van Kerr, an unprincipled grafter, to place Eric in a position involving both his financial and his personal honor, the only solution of which shall be that he yield to the implorations of his inamorata, the wife of his chief.

A few days later, Frieda traps the young man in her boudoir, declares her love, and begs him to run away with her. Finding his loyalty to his absent sweetheart still unshaken, she informs him that the stock which she recently borrowed of him, she tricked out of him, the better to have him In her control now.

Eric, left to choose his course, is visited by a vision of his mediaeval [sic] forbear, Sir Errol. The life of that blasted flower of ancient chivalry passes before his inner eye in a series of vivid pictures until, over the dead body of the Lady Maud, in the character of Errol, he swears to atone for his faithlessness. Coming to himself, the young man recognizes in the present situation the opportunity for expiation which the restless soul of his ancestor has been seeking for nine hundred years.

That night he attends the Carewe's fancy dress ball, costumed as the knight of old. Frieda is robed as the faithless Elfrieda. And Joan, mysteriously returned from the Southland, appears as Lady Maud. Eric is discovered by his temptress, renewing his vows to Joan. Frieda turns over the block of stock to Van Kerr, and Carewe, entering, demands an explanation. A quarrel ensues. Eric is just in time to save Carewe from being choked to death by his enemy. Frieda, check-mated, sobs out her bitter rebellion against Fate."

== Cast ==
- Eugenie Forde as Lady Elfrieda / Frieda Carewe
- Helen Rosson as Lady Maud / Joan Long
- Richard La Reno
- Harry von Meter as Baron Edward / Pierpont Carewe
- William Stowell as Lord Kerrigan / Van Kerr
- Forrest Taylor as Sir Errol / Thomas Eric
