= True Nobility =

1916 film by Donald MacDonald

- Directed by: Donald MacDonald
- Starring: Helene Rosson; Forrest Taylor
- Distributed by: Mutual Film
- Release date: March 9, 1916
- Country: United States
- Language: Silent (English intertitles)

True Nobility is a 1916 American silent drama about mining, directed by Donald MacDonald starring Helene Rosson and Forrest Taylor.

== Cast ==
- Helene Rosson as Effie Marsh
- Forrest Taylor as Phil Burton
- Lizette Thorne as Jean Bradford
- Charles Newton as Mr. Burton
- Eugenie Forde as Countess Nicasio
- Harry McCabe as Count Nicasio
- Marie Van Tassell as Mrs. Burton
- Harry von Meter as Lord Devlin
