= The Power of Melody =

- Written by: Paul Williams
- Produced by: David Horsley
- Starring: Harry von Meter; Vivian Rich; Eugenie Forde
- Production company: Nestor Film Company
- Distributed by: Motion Picture Distributors and Sales Company
- Release date: May 20, 1912
- Country: United States
- Languages: Silent film English intertitles

The Power of Melody (also known as Delirium Tremens) is a 1912 American silent short drama film starring Harry Van Meter, Vivian Rich, and Eugenie Forde. The film was written by pianist Paul Williams of Morristown, Indiana.

== Plot ==
A dramatic portrayal of how music influenced the lives of several people in New York City and started them on a better course.

== Cast ==
- Harry von Meter as Albert Earle
- Vivian Rich
- Eugenie Forde
