= The Yellow Typhoon =

1920 film

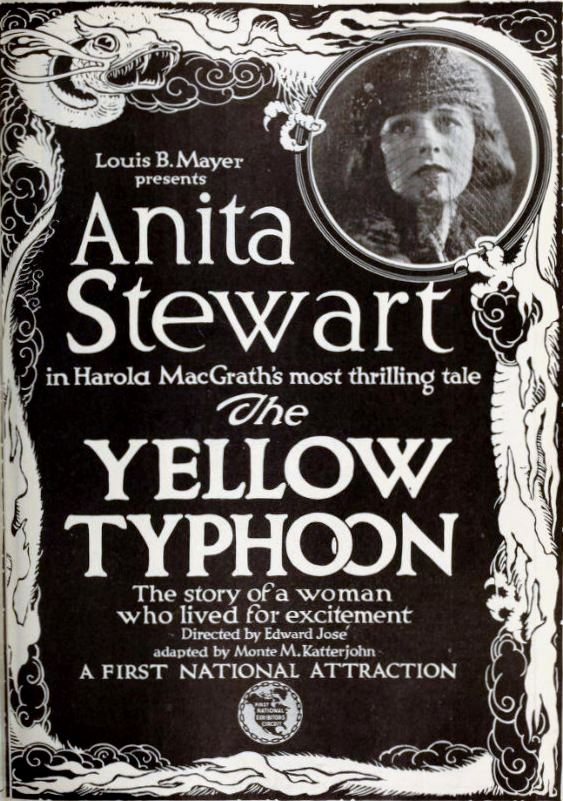
- Advertisement
- Directed by: Edward José
- Screenplay by: Monte M. Katterjohn
- Based on: The Yellow Typhoon by Harold MacGrath
- Produced by: Louis B. Mayer; Anita Stewart
- Starring: Anita Stewart; Ward Crane; Donald MacDonald; Joseph Kilgour; George Fisher; Ed Brady
- Cinematography: René Guissart
- Production companies: Anita Stewart Productions; Louis B. Mayer Productions
- Distributed by: First National Exhibitors' Circuit
- Release date: May 3, 1920
- Running time: 60 minutes
- Country: United States
- Language: Silent (English intertitles)

The Yellow Typhoon is a 1920 American silent drama film directed by Edward José and written by Monte M. Katterjohn. It is based on the 1919 novel The Yellow Typhoon by Harold MacGrath. The film stars Anita Stewart, Ward Crane, Donald MacDonald, Joseph Kilgour, George Fisher, and Ed Brady. The film was released on May 3, 1920, by First National Exhibitors' Circuit.

== Cast ==
- Anita Stewart as Hilda / Berta Nordstorm
- Ward Crane as John Mathison
- Donald MacDonald as Robert Hallowell
- Joseph Kilgour as Karl Lysgaard
- George Fisher as M. Andre Duval
- Ed Brady as Morgan
