= The Sign of the Spade =

- Directed by: Murdock MacQuarrie
- Written by: Kenneth B. Clarke
- Starring: Allan Forrest
- Cinematography: Robert Doreau
- Production company: American Film Manufacturing Company
- Distributed by: Mutual Film Company
- Release date: June 26, 1916
- Running time: 5 reels
- Country: USA
- Language: Silent..English titles

The Sign of the Spade is a 1916 American silent film drama directed by Murdock MacQuarrie and starring Allan Forrest and Helene Rosson. It was distributed through the Mutual Film Company.

== Cast ==
- Allan Forrest - Howard Lamson
- Helene Rosson - Shirley Lamson
- Warren Ellsworth - Wallace Thorpe
- Harvey Clark - Old Deefy/James Fenton (*as Harvey Clarke)
- Clarence Burton - Dave Harmon
- Robert Miller - Theodore Roosevelt Jenkins
- George Gebhardt - Tony Rimonetti

== Preservation status ==
The film is preserved (in nitrate) at the U.S. Library of Congress.
