= The Border Legion (1924 film) =

1924 film

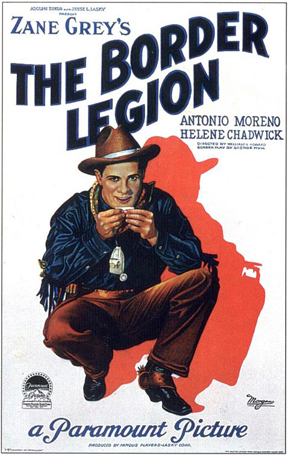
- Theatrical release poster
- Directed by: William K. Howard
- Written by: George C. Hull
- Based on: The Border Legion by Zane Grey
- Produced by: Adolph Zukor; Jesse L. Lasky
- Starring: Antonio Moreno; Helene Chadwick
- Cinematography: Alvin Wyckoff
- Production company: Famous Players–Lasky
- Distributed by: Paramount Pictures
- Release date: October 19, 1924 (NYC)
- Running time: 70 minutes; 7 reels, 7,048 ft.
- Country: United States
- Languages: Silent; English intertitles

The Border Legion is a lost 1924 American silent Western film directed by William K. Howard and starring Antonio Moreno and Helene Chadwick. Written by George C. Hull and based on the 1916 novel The Border Legion by Zane Grey, the film is about a cowboy who is wrongly accused of murder and is rescued by the leader of a band of Idaho outlaws known as the Border Legion. When the outlaws kidnap a young woman, the cowboy knows that he must help the woman escape. The film premiered on October 19, 1924 in New York City and was released in the United States on November 24, 1924 by Paramount Pictures.

== Plot ==
After Joan Randle accuses her fiancé Jim Cleve of being worthless, Jim travels to Idaho where he is wrongly accused of murder. He is rescued by Kells, the leader of a band of outlaws known as the Border Legion. Jim decides to join the outlaw band.

Meanwhile, Joan regrets how she treated her former sweetheart and follows him out West, where she is captured by Kells and is forced to shoot him in self-defense. In the coming days, Joan nurses Kells back to health, and the grateful outlaw soon falls in love with her. During a mining camp raid, Jim and Joan manage to escape, but while traveling by stagecoach, the legion catches up to them, Jim is shot and left for dead, and Joan is taken captive.

At the hideout, Kells and Gulden cut cards to see who ends up with Joan and the gold from the recent raid. Gulden wins the cut, but just then an injured Jim arrives and tries to save Joan from her dastardly captors. During the struggle, Kells and Gulden draw guns on each other, and both are killed in the exchange. Jim and Joan are reunited.

== Cast ==
- Antonio Moreno as Jim Cleve
- Helene Chadwick as Joan Randle
- Rockliffe Fellowes as Kells
- Gibson Gowland as Gulden
- Charles Ogle as Harvey Roberts
- Jim Corey as Pearce
- Eddie Gribbon as Blicky
- Luke Cosgrave as Bill Randle

== Critical response ==
The Border Legion received a mixed review in Variety magazine.

An out-and-out Western produced with a great deal of care and with a good cast, made from one of the most famous Grey novels and yet it doesn't sum up as anything great. The reason for that may be the age of the plot, for from the beginning to the end there is never a doubt as to its outcome.

== Adaptations ==
The 1916 novel The Border Legion by Zane Grey was first adapted to film in 1918 with The Border Legion, directed by T. Hayes Hunter and starring Blanche Bates, Hobart Bosworth, and Eugene Strong. This 1924 adaptation directed by William K. Howard and starring Antonio Moreno and Helene Chadwick was the second silent film version produced by Paramount Pictures. Paramount would produce two more adaptations. In 1930, the first sound film adaptation was directed by Otto Brower and Edwin H. Knopf, The Border Legion, starring Jack Holt and Fay Wray. Finally in 1934, The Last Round-Up was released, directed by Henry Hathaway and starring Randolph Scott and Barbara Fritchie.
