= Johnny Come Lately =

1943 film by William K. Howard

- Directed by: William K. Howard
- Screenplay by: John Van Druten
- Based on: Louis Bromfield (1938 Novel "Mcleod's Folly")
- Produced by: William Cagney
- Starring: James Cagney; Grace George; Marjorie Main
- Cinematography: Theodor Sparkuhl
- Edited by: George M. Arthur
- Music by: Leigh Harline
- Production company: William Cagney Productions
- Distributed by: United Artists
- Release date: September 3, 1943 (United States)
- Running time: 97 minutes
- Country: United States
- Language: English
- Box office: $1.4 million (US rentals) or $2.4 million

Johnny Come Lately is a 1943 drama film directed by William K. Howard starring James Cagney, Grace George, Marjorie Main and Hattie McDaniel. It was the first film produced by Cagney's brother, William Cagney.

The title is derived from the idiom "Johnny Come Lately", which refers to a newcomer who seeks to change an established system. The film centers on a drifter who comes to a new town and is faced with the question of choosing integrity or financial gain.

== Plot ==
In 1906, Tom Richards, a drifter, arrives in the small town of Plattsville. He sits reading a book in the town square when newspaper proprietor Vinnie McLeod speaks to him and offers him help. She goes to meet wealthy mayor Dougherty, a corrupt man who also owns a rival newspaper.

Mrs. McLeod re-encounters Richards in the town courtroom where he is on trial for vagrancy. She offers him a job as a journalist to allow him to escape imprisonment. He starts to shake the place up, and asks to close the paper (the Shield and Banner) for 3 days to redesign and relaunch it, specifically launching an attack on Dougherty.

Meanwhile Dougherty's son is in love with Mrs. McLeod's niece.

Dougherty offers Richards a job paying three times more but he declines due to his morals. Dougherty goes to extreme measures and sends two hired guns to shoot Mrs. McLeod. They hit her in the hand. Richards (who pre-empted the attack and has a gun) chases them off, shooting one.

Mrs. McLeod's niece starts to fall in love with Richards but decides it is young Dougherty she loves.

An eccentric rich woman, nicknamed "Gashouse Mary" (clearly modelled on Mae West) gives funds usually channeled through Dougherty to the orphanage to Richards instead. When she taunts Dougherty she ends up in prison on a bail of $1,500.

Dougherty starts to bend when the entire town parades by holding an effigy of him on a gibbet. Richards and Dougherty Jr. start brawling in the street and Richards is arrested and taken off in a horse-drawn black maria. The townsfolk storm the jail and release him.

In the end Dougherty senior meets with Mrs. McLeod and Richards and agrees to leave town for the sake of his son and her niece. All agree. He also gives back Mrs. McLeod the mortgage on her property. Richards too decides to move on.

== Cast ==
- James Cagney as Tom Richards
- Grace George as Vinnie McLeod (as Miss Grace George)
- Marjorie Main as Gashouse Mary
- Marjorie Lord as Jane
- Hattie McDaniel as Aida, Mrs McLeod's servant
- Edward McNamara as W.M. Dougherty
- William Henry as Pete Dougherty (as Bill Henry)
- Robert Barrat as Bill Swain
- George Cleveland as Willie Ferguson, a kindly drunkard working for McLeod
- Margaret Hamilton as Myrtle Ferguson, McLeod's receptionist
- Norman Willis as Dudley Hirsh
- Lucien Littlefield as Blaker
- Edwin Stanley as Winterbottom
- Irving Bacon as Chief of Police
- Tom Dugan as First Cop
- Charles Irwin as Second Cop
- John Sheehan as Third Cop
- Clarence Muse as Butler
- John Skins Miller as First Tramp (as John Miller)
- Arthur Hunnicutt as Second Tramp
- Victor Kilian as Tramp in Box Car
- Wee Willie Davis as Bouncer (as Wee Willie Davis)
- Joseph Crehan as Judge Flynn (uncredited)
- Harry Tenbrook as Saloon Patron (uncredited)

== Preservation ==
Johnny Come Lately was preserved by the Academy Film Archive, in conjunction with the UCLA Film and Television Archive, in 2013.
