= Not My Sister =

1916 film directed by Charles Giblyn

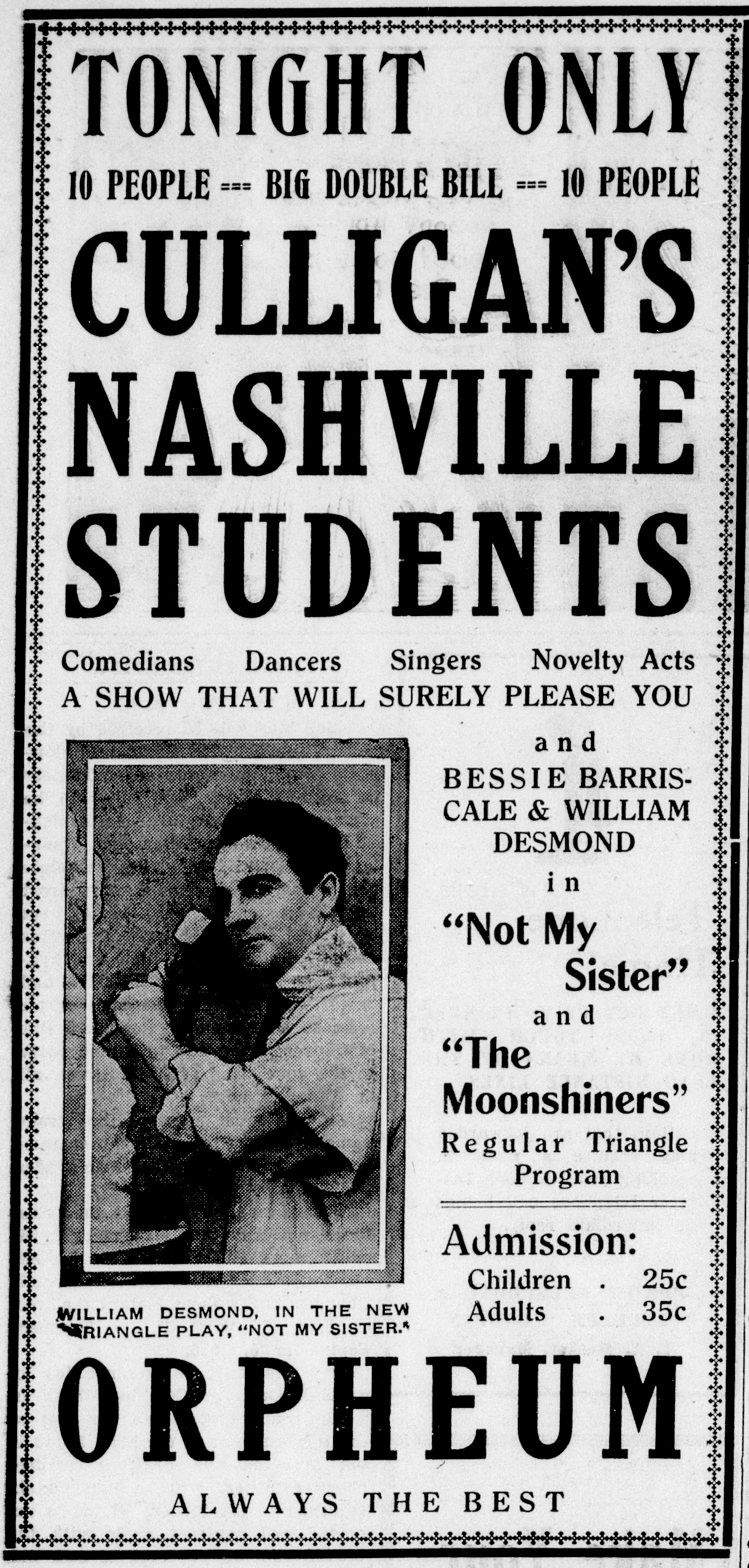
- Newspaper advertisement
- Directed by: Charles Giblyn
- Written by: James Montgomery; C. Gardner Sullivan
- Produced by: Thomas H. Ince
- Starring: Bessie Barriscale; William Desmond
- Production company: Kay-Bee Pictures under New York Motion Picture Company
- Distributed by: Triangle Film Corporation
- Release date: May 14, 1916
- Running time: 5 reels (50-60 minutes)
- Country: USA
- Language: Silent with English intertitles

Not My Sister is a 1916 silent film drama directed by Charles Giblyn and starring Bessie Barriscale and William Desmond. It was produced by Thomas H. Ince for Kay-Bee Pictures and distributed by Triangle Film Corporation in Culver City, California.

== Cast ==
- Bessie Barriscale - Grace Tyler
- William Desmond - Michael Arnold
- Franklin Ritchie - John Marshall
- Alice Terry - Ruth Tyler (credited as Alice Taafe)
- Louise Brownell - Mrs. Tyler
- Mabel Johnson - undetermined
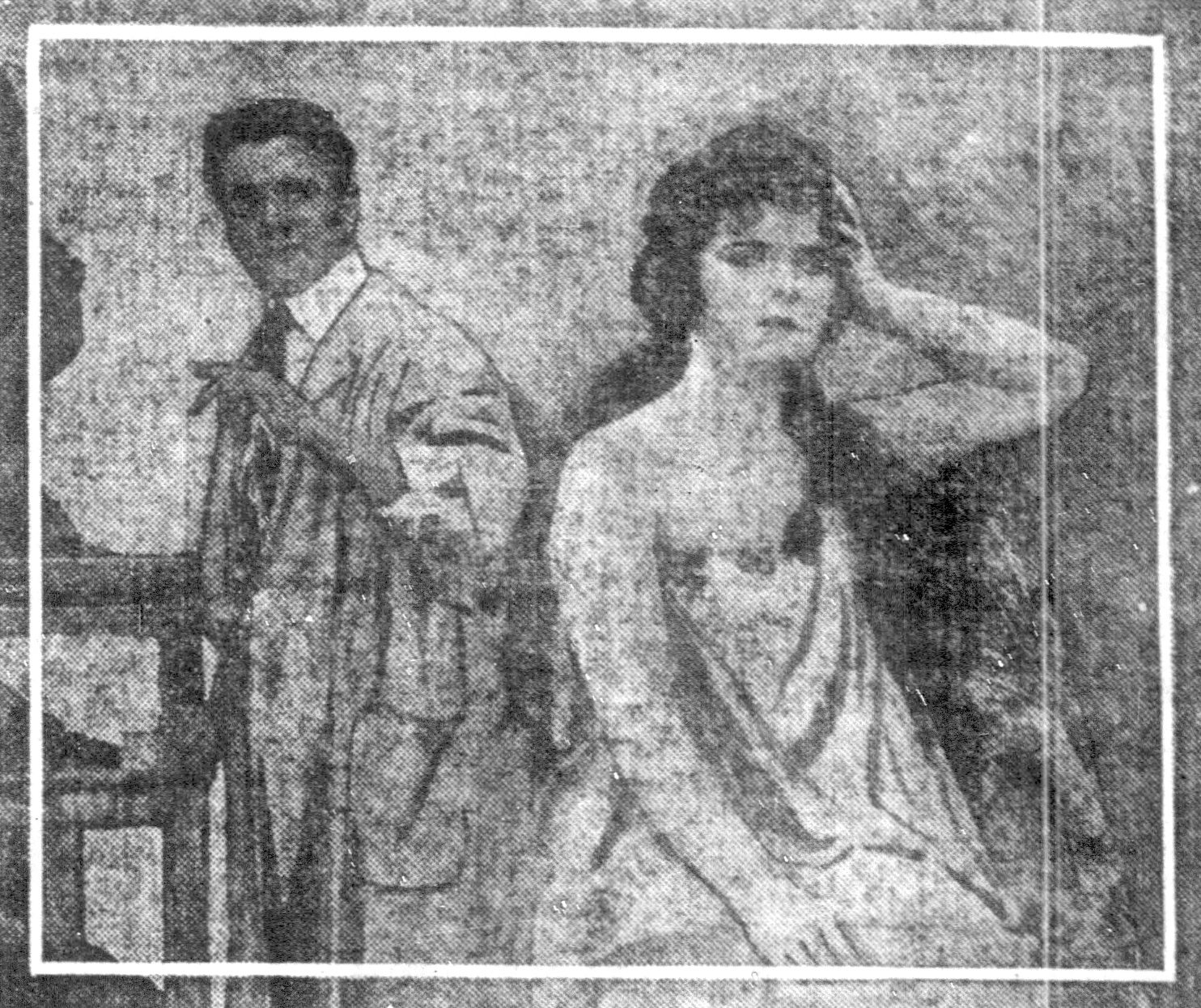
Scene from the film

== Preservation ==
With no prints of Not My Sister located in any film archives, it is considered a lost film. The film is included among the National Film Preservation Board's list of "7,200 Lost U.S. Silent Feature Films" as of October 2019.
