= Helene Rosson =

American actress

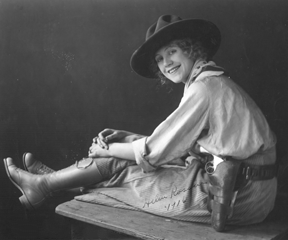
- Rosson, c. 1916
- Born: Helen Margaret Rosson; June 14, 1897; Newport, Rhode Island, U.S.
- Died: May 5, 1985 (aged 87); Palm Beach, Florida, U.S.
- Resting place: Woodlawn Cemetery
- Occupation: Actress
- Years active: 1915–1924
- Spouse(s): Ashton Dearholt (divorced); Charles Guilford Terry
- Relatives: Harold Rosson (brother); Arthur Rosson (brother); Richard Rosson (brother)

Helene Rosson (born Helen Margaret Rosson; June 14, 1897 – May 5, 1985), also known as Hellene Rosson, was an American silent film actress.

== Biography ==
Hellene Rosson, born June 14, 1897, was the sixth child and third daughter of jockey and horse trainer Arthur Richard Rosson (1857–1935) and Hellen Rochefort Rosson (1860–1933). Rosson entered film in 1915 and starred in 37 films over her ten-year career until 1925. She starred in films such as The Craving in 1916 with actors such as Charlotte Burton. She died in 1985, aged 87. She is interred at Woodlawn Cemetery in The Bronx, New York.

== Partial filmography ==
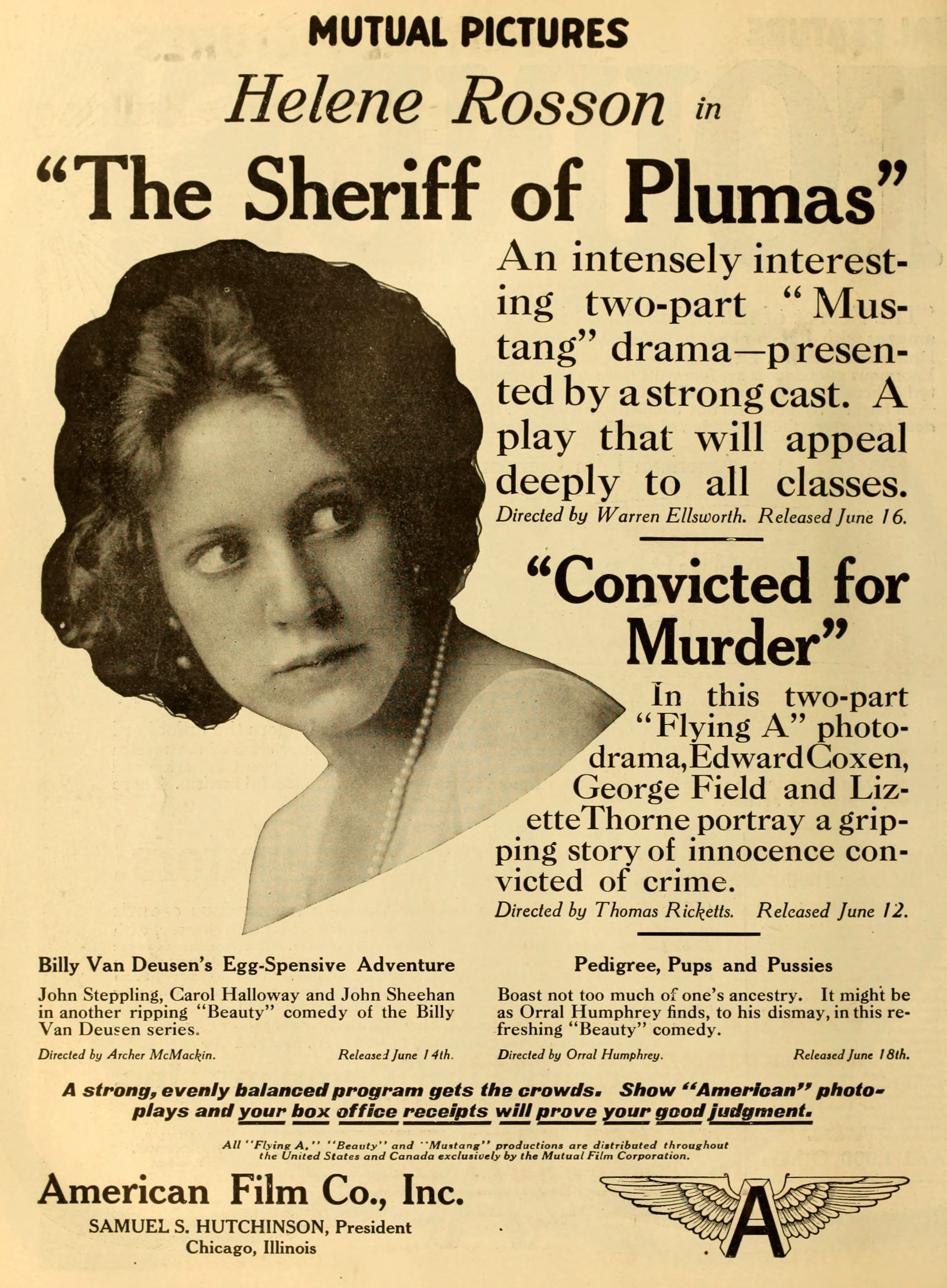
Film advertisement in The Moving Picture World, 1916

- The Grind (1915)
- The White Rosette (1916)
- The Craving (1916)
- True Nobility (1916)
- The Release of Dan Forbes (1916)
- The Abandonment (1916)
- The Sign of the Spade (1916)
- The Undertow (1916)
- The Price of a Good Time (1917)
- Ace High (1919)
- Get Your Man (1921)
- Devil Dog Dawson (1921)
- At Devil's Gorge (1923)
- Danger Ahead (1923)
- The Fugitive (1925)
- Wild Horse Canyon (1925)
