= Danger Ahead (1923 film) =

1923 film

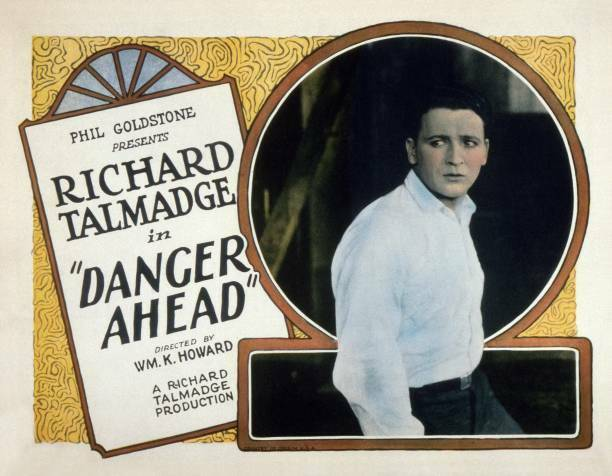
- Lobby card
- Directed by: William K. Howard
- Written by: Keene Thompson
- Produced by: Phil Goldstone
- Starring: Richard Talmadge; Helene Rosson; J.P. Lockney
- Cinematography: Reginald Lyons
- Production company: Phil Goldstone Productions
- Distributed by: Phil Goldstone Productions
- Release date: September 1923
- Running time: 50 minutes
- Country: United States
- Language: Silent (English intertitles)

Danger Ahead is a 1923 American silent crime drama film directed by William K. Howard and starring Richard Talmadge, Helene Rosson, and J.P. Lockney.

== Plot ==
As described in a film magazine review, Bruce Randall fights with Mortimer when he finds him trying to rob his home, and Randall is injured and wanders away, losing all memory of his past. He is reported as being dead and falls into the hands of two unscrupulous lawyers. They induce him to impersonate Bruce Randall (himself) in order to obtain some pearls. Mrs. Randall accepts him as being her husband. Later his memory is restored and the swindlers defeated, with husband and wife reunited.

== Cast ==
- Richard Talmadge as Bruce Randall
- Helene Rosson as Mrs. Randall
- J.P. Lockney as Todd
- David Kirby as Mahoney
- Fred R. Stanton as Mortimer

== Bibliography ==
- Connelly, Robert B. The Silents: Silent Feature Films, 1910-36, Volume 40, Issue 2. December Press, 1998.
- Munden, Kenneth White. The American Film Institute Catalog of Motion Pictures Produced in the United States, Part 1. University of California Press, 1997.
