= Franklin Ritchie =

American actor (1865–1918)

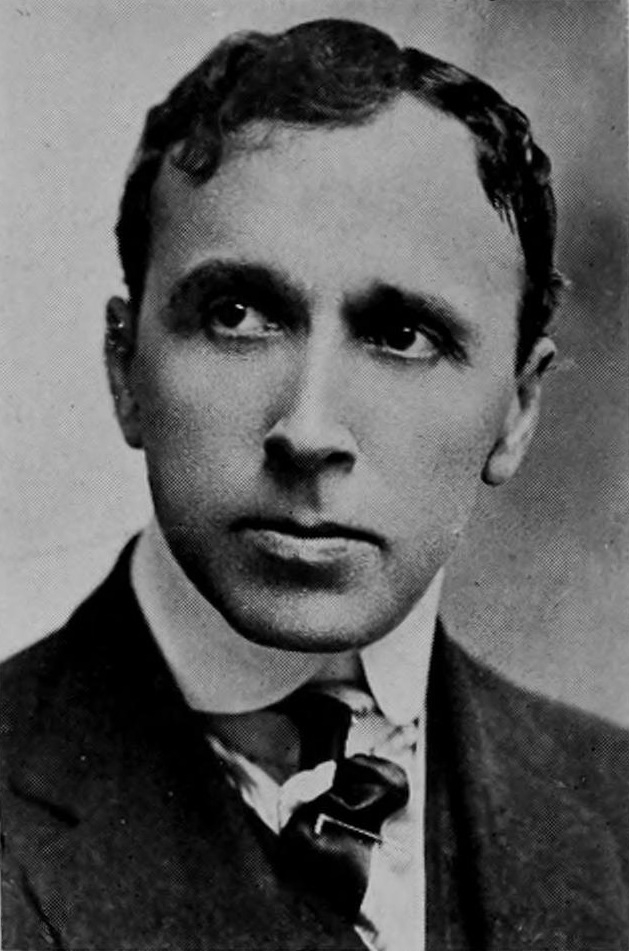
- Born: June 26, 1865; Ritchie, Pennsylvania, US
- Died: January 26, 1918 (aged 52); Los Angeles, California, US
- Occupation: Actor
- Years active: 1913-1917

Franklin Ritchie (June 26, 1865 – January 26, 1918) was an American actor of the silent film era. Following his film career with the American Film company, he became an automobile dealer.

== Biography ==
Born as George Frank Ritchie on June 26, 1865 in Ritchie, Clinton County, Pennsylvania, Franklin Edward Ritchie appeared in fifty-one films between 1913 and 1917.

Ritchie died at the age of fifty-two on Friday, January 25, 1918 when a car he was driving skidded off of a mountain road and fell down an embankment near Los Angeles, California after the edge of the road collapsed. A passenger riding in the car of his friend, William Hamilton, Ritchie was reported to have died instantly while Hamilton was left "injured painfully but not seriously."

== Selected filmography ==
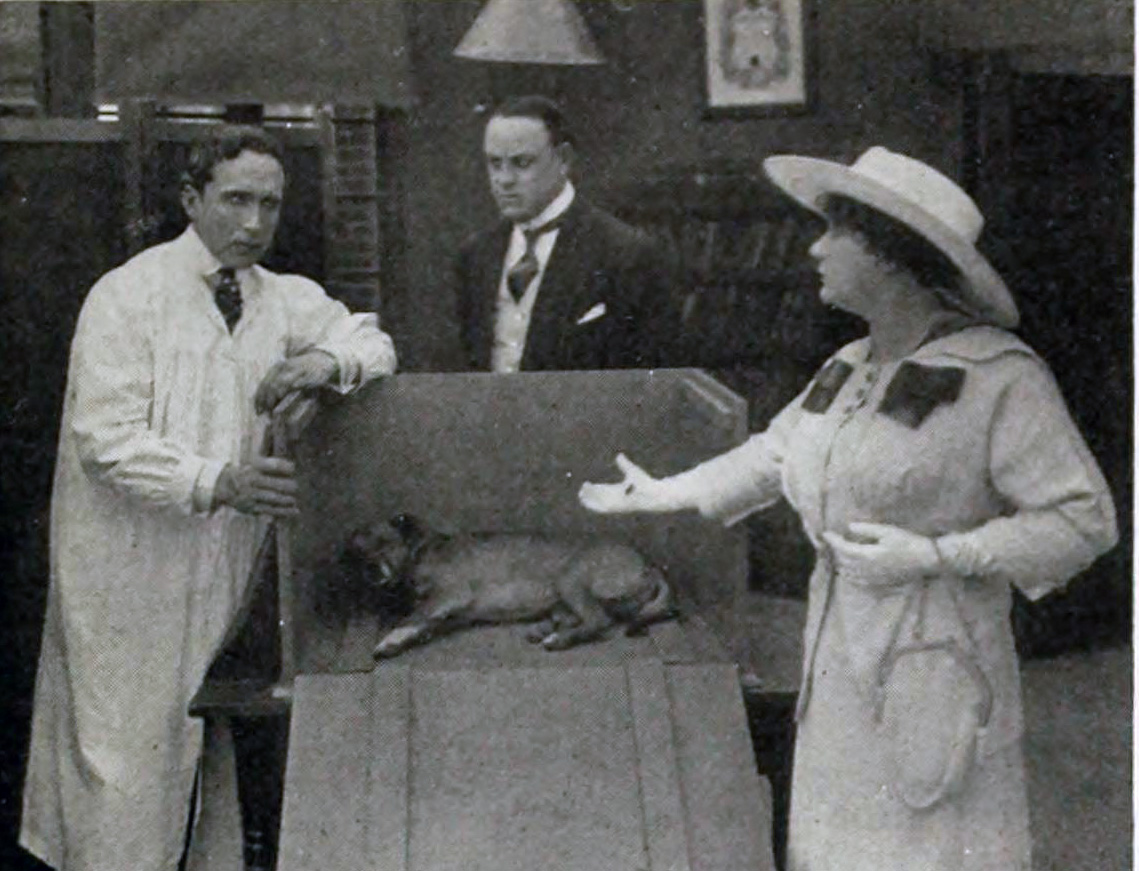
Ritchie (left) in The Inner Struggle (1916)

- Man's Enemy (1914)
- Not My Sister (1916)
- The Undertow (1916)
- The Gentle Intruder (1917)
