= Klondike Fury =

1942 film by William K. Howard

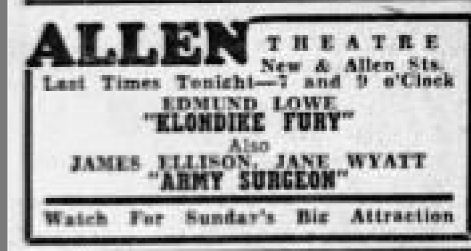
- Newspaper advertisement
- Directed by: William K. Howard
- Written by: Henry Blankfort
- Story by: Tristram Tupper
- Produced by: King Brothers
- Starring: Edmund Lowe
- Cinematography: L. William O'Connell
- Edited by: Jack Dennis
- Production company: King Brothers Productions
- Distributed by: Monogram Pictures
- Release date: 1942
- Running time: 68 minutes
- Country: United States
- Language: English
- Budget: $24,000

Klondike Fury is a 1942 American drama film directed by William K. Howard, produced by the King Brothers, and released through Monogram Pictures. It stars Edmund Lowe.

It is a remake of Monogram's 1932 feature Klondike, based on an original story by Tristram Tupper.

== Plot ==
A famous neurosurgeon, Dr, John Mandre, is thrown out of the medical profession after he performs a daring but unsuccessful surgery. When the patient's widow accuses him of murder, the disgraced doctor takes a job flying planes to Russia via Alaska. On his first flight, the plane crashes in the frozen wilderness of the Klondike. Dr. Mandre survives the crash, and his injuries are treated by a local physician, Dr. Brady. The proprietor of the trading post pleads with Dr. Mandre to perform an operation on his crippled son, who has the same condition as Mandre's unfortunate patient. Mandre uses the same radical technique, but this time the operation is a success. Dr. Mandre returns to civilization, and Dr. Brady follows him to give him full credit for the new technique. Dr. Mandre's reputation and career are restored.

== Cast ==
- Edmund Lowe as Dr. John Mandre
- Lucile Fairbanks as Peg Campbell
- William Henry as Jim Armstrong
- Ralph Morgan as Dr. Brady
- Robert Middlemass as Sam Armstrong
- Jean Brooks as Rae Langton
- Mary Forbes as Mrs. Langton
- Vince Barnett as Alaska
- Clyde Cook as Yukon
- Marjorie Wood as Ellen
- Monte Blue as Flight Dispatcher
- Kenneth Harlan as Flight Dispatcher

== Production ==
The film was originally known as Law of the Klondike. The lead role was offered to Jack Holt, Ralph Bellamy, and William Gargan, each at his regular salary, but all three turned it down because they did not wish to be associated with Monogram, a minor-league studio. Edmund Lowe accepted the role as a favor to his friend, former silent-film director William K. Howard, who was attempting a comeback at Monogram.

The film was made in seven-and-a-half days. Trade publisher Pete Harrison asked Monogram president W. Ray Johnston how much the film cost to make. Johnston replied, "Just had my auditor audit the books on Klondike Fury. The cost is $50,651,14. This does not include $13,075.00 for prints and advertising. We think Bill Howard and the producers did a terrific job for the money." Pete Harrison agreed: "As a matter of fact, it is admirable that Mr. Howard got so much dramatic value out of so small a budget. The production values would do honor to a picture made at a major studio."

== Reception ==
"Plenty of punch for adult audiences," reported Film Daily. "The fine acting of Edmund Lowe and the rest of the cast, and the clever direction of William K. Howard, makes it well worthwhile seeing. Henry Blankfort's screenplay is cleverly written, with modern treatment disposing of much of the dramatic corn in the original version." Vance King of Motion Picture Herald wrote, "One of the better pictures to come out of Monogram in recent months, the film has been given the advantages of an increased budget, which is evident in production investiture, strength of cast, and other talent."
