= The Power and the Glory (1933 film) =

1933 film by William K. Howard

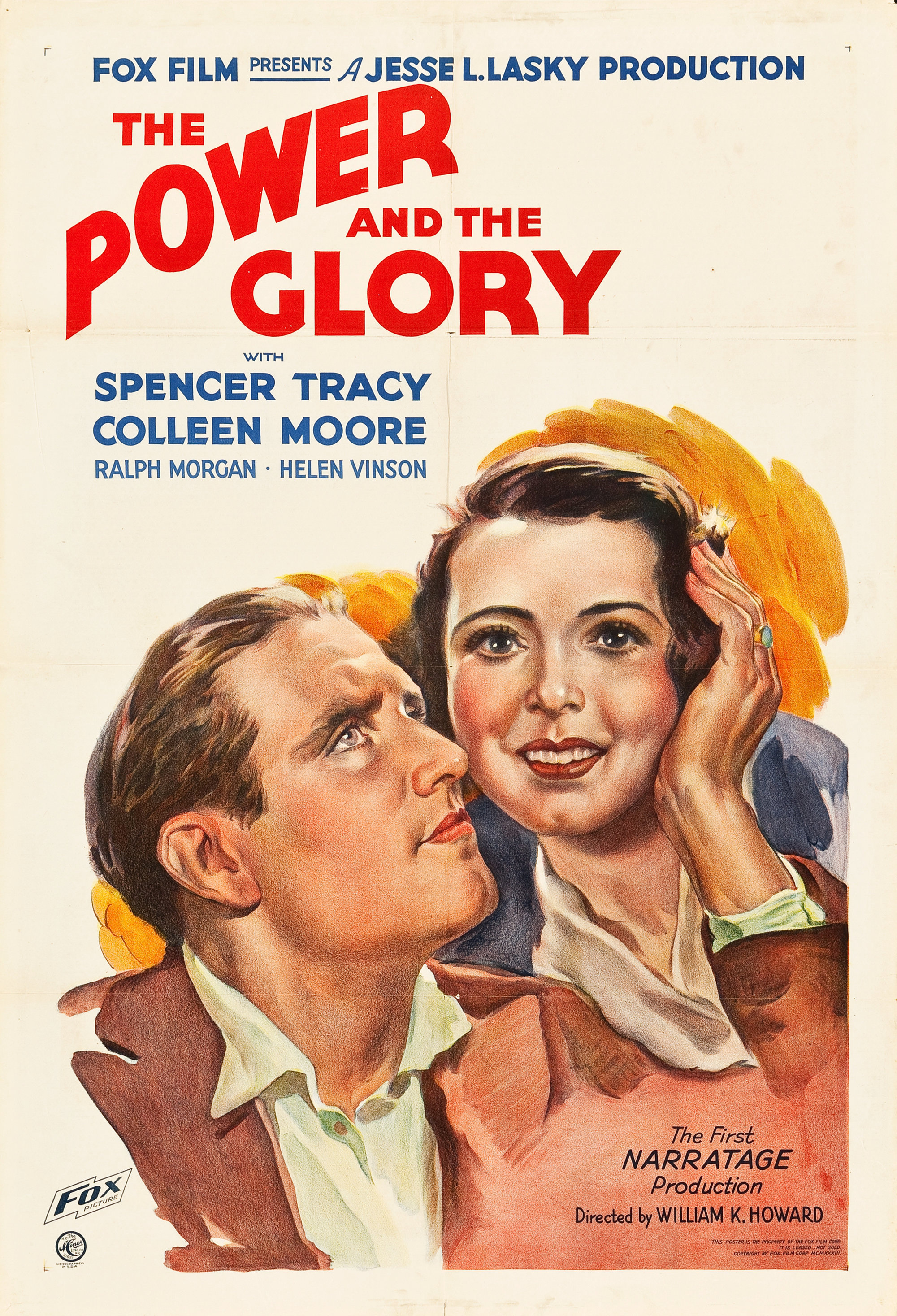
- Theatrical release poster
- Directed by: William K. Howard
- Written by: Preston Sturges
- Produced by: Jesse L. Lasky
- Starring: Spencer Tracy; Colleen Moore; Ralph Morgan; Helen Vinson
- Narrated by: Ralph Morgan
- Cinematography: James Wong Howe
- Edited by: Paul Weatherwax
- Music by: J.S. Zamecnik
- Production company: Fox Film Corporation
- Distributed by: Fox Film Corporation
- Release date: August 16, 1933
- Running time: 76 minutes
- Country: United States
- Language: English
- Box office: $563,323.88

The Power and the Glory is a 1933 pre-Code film starring Spencer Tracy and Colleen Moore, written by Preston Sturges, and directed by William K. Howard. The picture's screenplay was Sturges' first script, which he delivered complete in the form of a finished shooting script, for which he received $17,500 ($435,300 today) and a percentage of the profits. Profit-sharing arrangements, now a common practice in Hollywood, were then unusual and gained Sturges much attention.

The film, told through flashbacks, was cited by Pauline Kael in her controversial essay "Raising Kane", as a prototype for the narrative structure of Citizen Kane (1941). (Screenwriter Herman J. Mankiewicz, who along with Orson Welles won an Oscar for the screenplay of Citizen Kane, was a friend of Sturges.)

The Power and the Glory was loosely based by Sturges on the life of C. W. Post, his second wife's grandfather, who founded the Postum Cereal Company, which later became General Foods. Like Tom Garner, the lead character of the film, Post worked his way up from the bottom, and ended his own life. Otherwise, according to Sturges, their lives did not correspond.

In 2014, The Power and the Glory was deemed "culturally, historically, or aesthetically significant" by the Library of Congress and selected for preservation in the National Film Registry. The film's copyright was renewed.

The film is unrelated to the 1940 novel of the same title by Graham Greene.

== Plot ==
After the funeral service for Tom Garner, a powerful and much-hated railroad tycoon who committed suicide, his best friend Henry recalls Garner's life, his family problems, and his rise from track walker to president of the railroad.

== Cast ==
- Spencer Tracy as Tom Garner
- Colleen Moore as Sally Garner
- Ralph Morgan as Henry
- Helen Vinson as Eve Borden
- Phillip Trent as Tom Garner, Jr.
- Henry Kolker as Mr. Borden
- J. Farrell MacDonald as Mulligan
- Sarah Padden as Henry's Wife
- George Chandler as Young Member – Board of Directors (uncredited)
- Edward LeSaint as Doctor (uncredited)
- Russell Simpson as College Professor (uncredited)
- Robert Warwick as Edward (uncredited)

Cast notes

- The cast includes four actors who had been film directors during the silent film era: Phillips Smalley, E. H. Calvert, Frank Beal and Tom Ricketts.
- Some 400 extras were used in the railroad roundhouse scene.

== Production ==
Sturges originally wrote the script as a freelance project after being let go by Universal Pictures. He told the story to producer Jesse L. Lasky, who had his own unit at Fox Film, and requested a treatment. Sturges refused to do a treatment, and instead delivered a finished shooting script, which Lasky said was "the most perfect script I'd ever seen", with nothing that needed to be trimmed.

Sturges offered the script to Lasky for $62,475, but Lasky instead structured a deal in which Sturges got $17,500 upon signing, 3 1/2% of the first $500,000 in receipts, 5% of the next $500,000, and 7% of all receipts over $1,000,000. Such a percentage deal was highly unusual at that time, and caused an uproar among producers and writers.

Both director William K. Howard and Spencer Tracy were supposed to have worked on Marie Galante, but when it was postponed, they were transferred to The Power and the Glory. Irene Dunne and Mary Astor were both considered for the part of Sally Garner, played by Colleen Moore. Moore was lent to Fox by MGM, as was Helen Vinson, and had not appeared in a film since 1929.

The film was in production from 23 March to late April 1933, with some re-shooting in June 1933. It had originally been set to begin in late February 1933, but was postponed several times.

Location shooting took place at the Hasson station beyond the Santa Susana Pass, using the largest locomotive in the west, leased from the Southern Pacific Railroad; and at the Iverson Movie Ranch in Chatsworth, California.

During filming, Sturges served as the dialogue director, working with the actors much as he had done in stage rehearsals as a playwright.

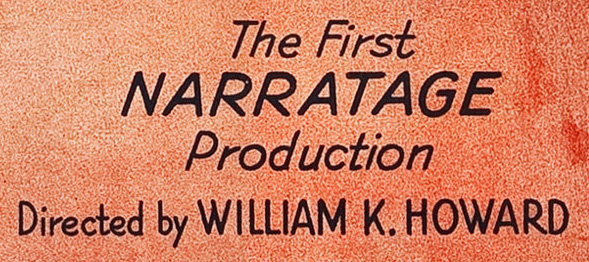
Fox's "Narratage" term, from the theatrical poster

The film was previewed in Los Angeles on 17 June 1933, and after objections from the Hays Office about the sexual nature of the relationship between a stepmother (Eve Borden) and her stepson (Tom Garner Jr.), some re-editing was done. When this did not satisfy the censors, reshooting and more extensive re-editing was done to alleviate their concerns. The film was premiered in New York City on 16 August 1933 at the Gaiety Theatre, and was generally released on 6 October of that year. Fox coined the word "narratage" to describe the non-chronological narration of the story.

== Response ==
Although the film was well received by critics, and Spencer Tracy's performance was especially praised, the film was not successful at the box office, except in New York City. The film was a box office disappointment for Fox. By the end of 1940, it had grossed a little over $500,000, which meant that Sturges had received only about $2,000 over his advance. By 1957, it had grossed around $1 million.

Sturges' innovative narrative structure was singled out by critics, and the praise was so great, the studio put a bronze plaque up on the New York movie theater where it had its world premiere. The bronze tablet hailed The Power and the Glory as "the first motion picture in which narratage was used as a method of telling a dramatic story."

Sturges' screenplay was widely praised. It was published in book form in 1934, and he received the 1933 Hollywood Reporter Award of Merit for Best Original Story.

On Rotten Tomatoes, the film holds a rating of 86% from 42 reviews.

== Temporarily lost film ==
When film critic Pauline Kael wrote "Raising Kane", her 1971 New Yorker article on the genesis of Citizen Kane, The Power and the Glory was virtually a "lost film". After writing about how Hollywood had praised the movie back in 1933 by putting up a bronze plaque on the New York movie theater where it had its premiere, she chided the movie industry for failing to preserve it.

"Hollywood, big on ballyhoo but short on real self-respect, failed to transfer the nitrate negative to safety stock, and modern prints of The Power and the Glory are tattered remnants." The movie was later restored and is now complete.
