= Stepping Fast =

1923 film

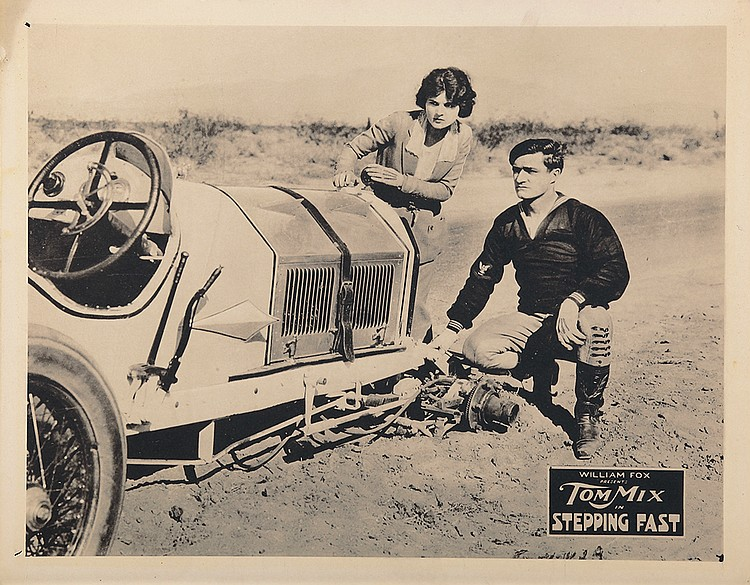
- Directed by: Joseph Franz
- Written by: Bernard McConville
- Produced by: William Fox
- Starring: Tom Mix; Claire Adams; Donald MacDonald
- Cinematography: Daniel B. Clark
- Production company: Fox Film Corporation
- Distributed by: Fox Film Corporation
- Release date: May 13, 1923
- Country: United States
- Languages: Silent; English intertitles

Stepping Fast is a 1923 American silent Western film directed by Joseph Franz and starring Tom Mix, Claire Adams and Donald MacDonald.

== Cast ==
- Tom Mix as Grant Malvern
- Claire Adams as Helen Durant
- Donald MacDonald as Fabian
- Hector V. Sarno as Martinez
- Edward Peil Sr. as Sun Yat
- George Siegmann as 'Red' Pollock
- Tom Guise as Quentin Durant
- Edward Jobson as Commodore Simpson
- Ethel Wales as Miss Higgins
- Minna Redman as Mrs. Malvern
- Tony the Horse

== Bibliography ==
- Munden, Kenneth White. The American Film Institute Catalog of Motion Pictures Produced in the United States, Part 1. University of California Press, 1997.
