= Wild Horse Canyon (1925 film) =

1925 film

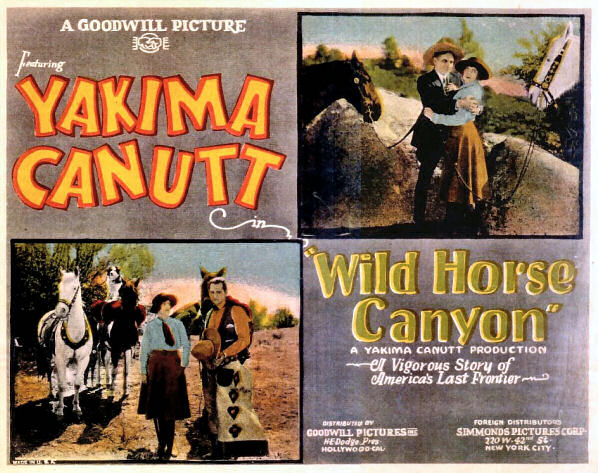
- Directed by: Ben F. Wilson
- Produced by: Yakima Canutt; Ben F. Wilson
- Starring: Yakima Canutt; Helene Rosson; Edward Cecil
- Production company: Goodwill Pictures
- Distributed by: Goodwill Pictures
- Release date: 1925
- Running time: 68 minutes
- Country: United States
- Languages: Silent; English intertitles

Wild Horse Canyon is a 1925 American silent Western film directed by Ben F. Wilson and starring Yakima Canutt, Helene Rosson and Edward Cecil.

== Cast ==
- Yakima Canutt as Yak Dawson
- Helene Rosson as Marie Wolcamp
- Edward Cecil as Rodney Roland
- Slim Talbot as Ted Edland
- Cliff Lyons as Ranch Hand
- Boy asStallion Boy - a Wild Horse

== Bibliography ==
- Connelly, Robert B. The Silents: Silent Feature Films, 1910-36, Volume 40, Issue 2. December Press, 1998.
- Munden, Kenneth White. The American Film Institute Catalog of Motion Pictures Produced in the United States, Part 1. University of California Press, 1997.
- Pitts, Michael R. Western Movies: A Guide to 5,105 Feature Films. McFarland, 2012.
