= The Smugglers of Santa Cruz =

1916 film by Donald MacDonald

- Directed by: Donald MacDonald
- Starring: Charlotte Burton; Eugenie Forde; George Periolat; William Russell; Roy Stewart
- Distributed by: Mutual Film
- Release date: January 28, 1916
- Country: United States
- Languages: Silent film English intertitles

The Smugglers of Santa Cruz is a 1916 American silent short drama film directed by Donald MacDonald starring Charlotte Burton, Eugenie Forde, George Periolat, William Russell, and Roy Stewart.
