= Eugenie Forde =

American silent film actress (1879-1940)

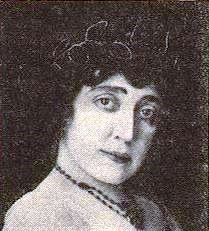
- Forde in 1916
- Born: June 22, 1879; New York City, US
- Died: September 5, 1940 (aged 61); Van Nuys, California, US
- Years active: 1912–1927
- Spouse: Guy H. Fetters (m. 1920, divorced)
- Children: Victoria Forde

Eugenie Forde (June 22, 1879 – September 5, 1940) was an American silent film actress.

She starred in 73 films between 1912 and 1927 in films such as The Diamond from the Sky (1915) and Wives and Other Wives with actors such as Charlotte Burton and William Garwood.

Forde retired from acting in 1924, but a trip to Europe spurred her to return to the profession. She found that her films were still being shown in Europe, and fans there encouraged her to resume her career. She returned to the screen in That's My Baby (1926).

She was the mother of actress Victoria Forde.

== Selected filmography ==
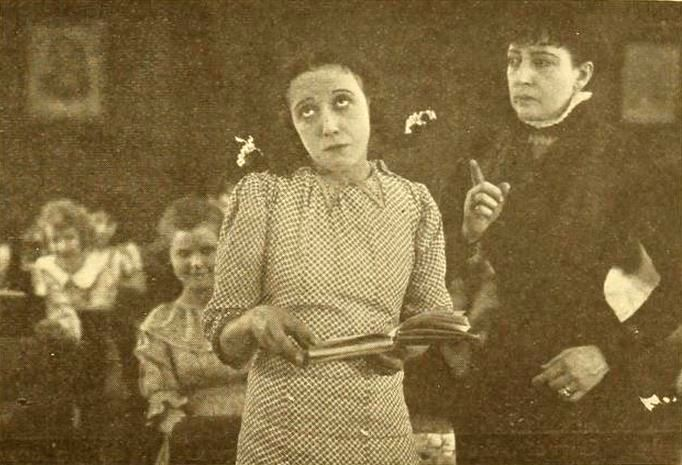
Mabel Normand and Eugenie Forde in Sis Hopkins (1919)

- The Power of Melody (1912, short)
- The Diamond from the Sky (1915) - Hagar Harding
- The Great Question (1915, short) - Lois Valerie - an Adventuress
- The Smugglers of Santa Cruz (1916, short) - Jean
- The White Rosette (1916) - Lady Elfrieda / Frieda Carewe
- True Nobility (1916) - Countess Nicasio
- Lying Lips (1916) - Wanda Howard
- The Courtesan (1916) - Mayda St. Maurice
- Purity (1916) - Judith Lure
- The Light (1916) -Zonia
- The Undertow (1916) - Mrs. King
- Lonesome Town (1916) - Mrs. Wonder
- The Innocence of Lizette (1916) - Granny Page
- The Gentle Intruder (1917) - Mrs. Baxter
- Annie-for-Spite (1917) - Mrs. Emily Nottingham
- The Upper Crust (1917) - Mrs. Todd
- Charity Castle (1917) - Zelma Verona
- Conscience (1917) - Madge's Mother
- Cupid's Round Up (1918) - Red Bird
- Wives and Other Wives (1918) - Mrs. Doubleday
- Fair Enough (1918) - Mrs. Ellen Dickson
- The Girl o' Dreams (1918) - Mrs. Hansen
- Sis Hopkins (1919) - Miss Peckover
- The Man Who Turned White (1919) - Minor Role (uncredited)
- Strictly Confidential (1919) - Jane
- Bonnie Bonnie Lassie (1919)
- The Virgin of Stamboul (1920) - Agia - Sari's Mother
- The Road to Divorce (1920) - Aunt Mehitable
- A Tokyo Siren (1920) - Minor role
- Sic-Em (1920) - Mrs. Chatfield Curtis
- See My Lawyer (1921) - Aunt Kate
- A Ridin' Romeo (1921) - Queenie Farrell
- Fortune's Mask (1922) - Madame Ortiz
- Cameo Kirby (1923) - Madame Davezac
- Blow Your Own Horn (1923) - Mrs. Jolyon
- Memory Lane (1926) - Mary's Mother
- That's My Baby (1926) - Mrs. John Raynor
- Captain Salvation (1927) - Mrs. Bellows
- Wilful Youth (1927) - Mrs. Claudia Tavernay
