= The Undertow (1916 film) =

1916 film by Frank Thorne

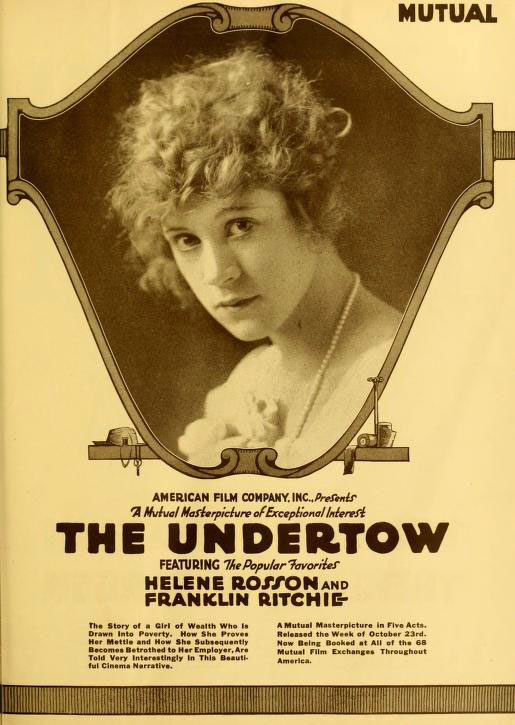
- Directed by: Frank Thorne
- Starring: Franklin Ritchie; Helene Rosson; Eugenie Forde
- Distributed by: Mutual Film
- Release date: October 23, 1916
- Running time: 5 reels
- Country: United States
- Languages: Silent film English intertitles

The Undertow is a lost 1916 American silent drama film directed by Frank Thorne starring Franklin Ritchie, Helene Rosson, and Eugenie Forde. It was released by the Mutual Film Company.

== Cast ==
- Franklin Ritchie as James King
- Helene Rosson as Esther
- Eugenie Forde as Mrs. King
- Orral Humphrey as Hammond
- Harry von Meter as John Morden
- George Ahearn as David Strong
- Ogden Childe
- Joseph De Grasse
