= Vivian Prescott =

Italian-born American actress

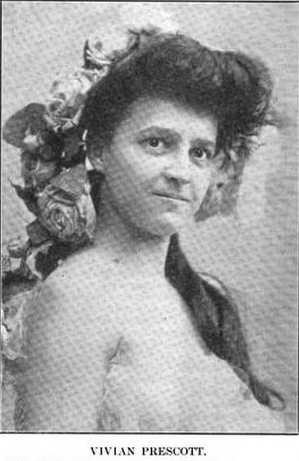
Prescott featured in a 1904 issue of Town Talk

Vivian Prescott was an Italian born American actress.

== Biography ==
Prescott appeared in 202 films between 1909 and 1917. She was born in Genoa, Italy and spent some time on the American stage before entering silent pictures.

== Filmography ==
- Winning Back His Love (1910)
- A Flash of Light (1910)
- Comrades (1911 short)
- Fisher Folks (1911)
- The Primal Call (1911 short) - The Millionaire's Girlfriend
- The Man from the West (1912) - Mary, the cook
- The Sands of Dee (1912)
- Man's Enemy (1914)
