= Man's Enemy =

1914 film

- Directed by: Frank Powell
- Written by: Eric Hudson; Charles H. Langdon; Frank E. Woods
- Starring: Lillian Gish
- Release date: August 1, 1914
- Running time: 30 minutes
- Country: United States
- Language: Silent with English intertitles

Man's Enemy is a 1914 American short drama film directed by Frank Powell and starring Lillian Gish. Prints of the film survive in the film archives of the Library of Congress and the Museum of Modern Art.

== Cast ==
- Lillian Gish
- Franklin Ritchie
- Vivian Prescott
- Henry B. Walthall
- Dorothy Gish

== See also ==
- Lillian Gish filmography
