= Grace George =

American actress (1879–1961)

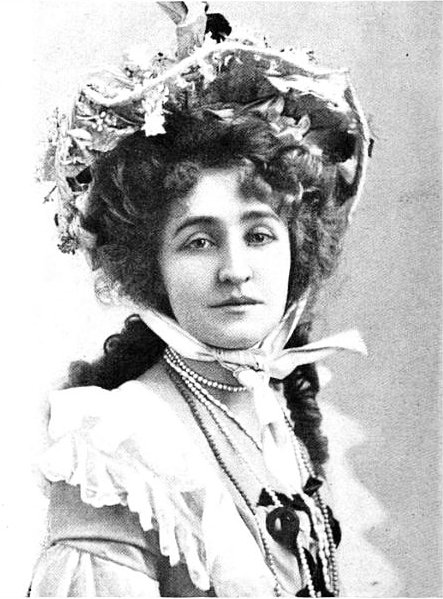
- George in 1903 dressed for role in play "Pretty Polly"
- Born: Grace George; December 25, 1879; New York City, US
- Died: May 19, 1961 (aged 81); New York City, US
- Occupation: Actress
- Years active: 1894–1951
- Spouse: William A. Brady

Grace George (December 25, 1879 – May 19, 1961) was a prominent American stage actress, who had a long career on Broadway stage and also appeared in two films.

== Biography ==
George was born on December 25, 1879. She married producer William A. Brady, a widower, and was stepmother to his daughter, actress Alice Brady.

George starred as Esther in the hugely successful 1899 Broadway adaptation of Ben Hur from Lew Wallace's novel. George appeared in a silent film called Tainted Money in 1915. In 1935, she gave an acclaimed performance as Mary Herries in Edward Chodorov's thriller, Kind Lady, at the Booth Theatre. She appeared in the film, Johnny Come Lately in 1943 with James Cagney. In 1950, she was awarded the Delia Austrian medal.

== Death ==
George died on May 19, 1961, aged 81, in New York City, having outlived both her son and her stepdaughter.

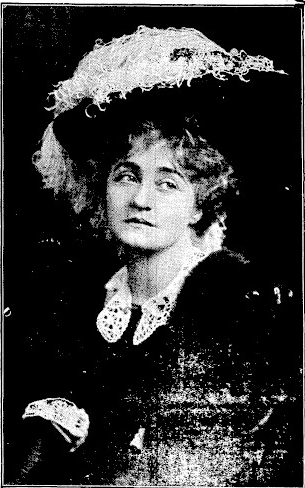
Grace George in "Sauce for the Goose," 1911

== Personal life ==
George married William A. Brady, a widower, in 1899. She became stepmother to his daughter, future actress Alice Brady. Her own son, William A. Brady Jr., was born in 1900 and died on September 26, 1935, in Colts Neck, New Jersey. Brady Jr. married actress Katharine Alexander and had a daughter, Barbara Brady, who became an actress.

Grace George's niece, Maude George, was a silent film character actor who appeared in a number of Erich von Stroheim films.

== Filmography ==
Year	Title	Role	Notes
1915	Tainted Money		
1943	Johnny Come Lately	Vinnie McLeod	(final film role)
