= At Devil's Gorge =

1923 film

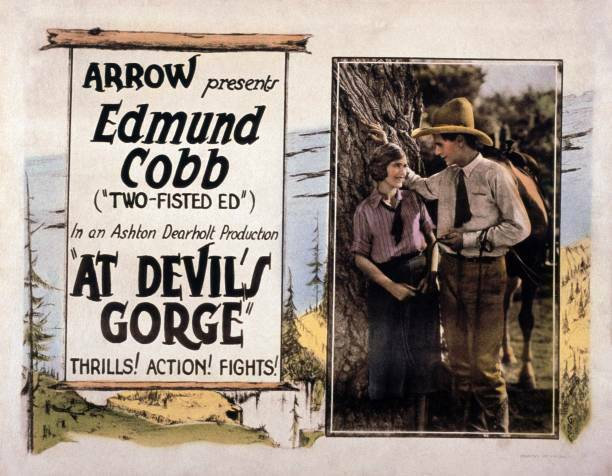
- Directed by: Ashton Dearholt
- Written by: Daniel F. Whitcomb
- Produced by: Ben F. Wilson; Ashton Dearholt
- Starring: Edmund Cobb; Helene Rosson; Wilbur McGaugh
- Production company: Ashton Dearholt Productions
- Distributed by: Arrow Film Corporation
- Release date: November 1, 1923
- Running time: 50 minutes
- Country: United States
- Languages: Silent; English intertitles

At Devil's Gorge is a lost 1923 American silent Western film directed by Ashton Dearholt and starring Edmund Cobb, Helene Rosson and Wilbur McGaugh.

In a gold mining boom town, greed and jealousy becomes between two partners and launches them on a deadly rivalry.

== Cast ==
- Edmund Cobb as Paul Clayton
- Helene Rosson as Mildred Morgan
- Wilbur McGaugh as Dav - Clayton's Partner
- William White as Pop Morgan
- Max Asher as Tobias Blake
- Ashton Dearholt as Stranger in Town

== Preservation ==
With no holdings located in archives, At Devil's Gorge is considered a lost film.

== Bibliography ==
- Langman, Larry. A Guide to Silent Westerns. Greenwood Publishing Group, 1992. ISBN 978-0-313-27858-7.
- Munden, Kenneth White. The American Film Institute Catalog of Motion Pictures Produced in the United States, Part 1. University of California Press, 1997. ISBN 978-0-520-20969-5.
