= A Ridin' Romeo =

1921 film

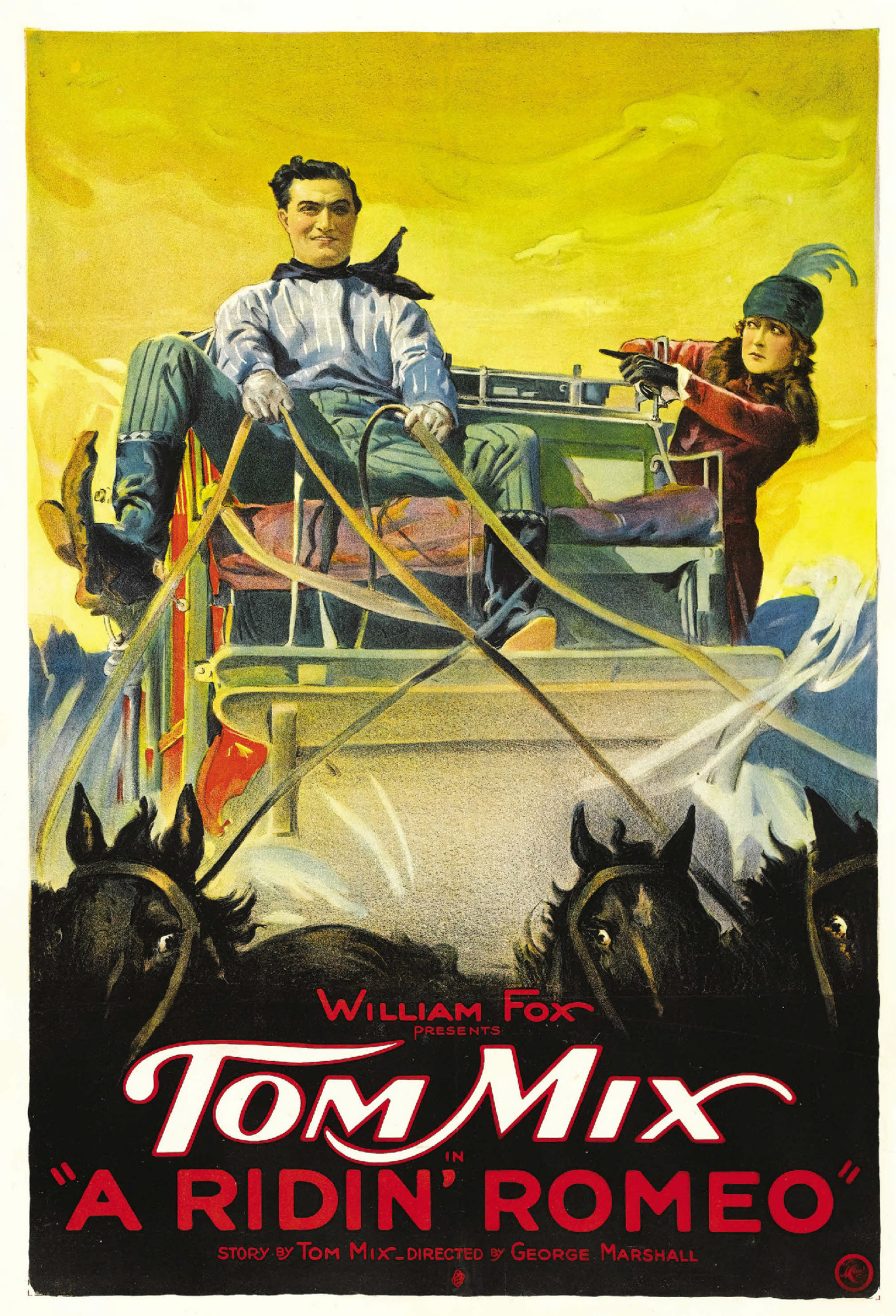
- Theatrical release poster
- Directed by: George Marshall
- Written by: George Marshall; Tom Mix; Ralph Spence
- Produced by: William Fox
- Starring: Tom Mix; Rhea Mitchell; Eugenie Forde
- Cinematography: Benjamin H. Kline
- Edited by: Ralph Spence
- Production company: Fox Film Corporation
- Distributed by: Fox Film Corporation
- Release date: May 22, 1921
- Running time: 50 minutes
- Country: United States
- Languages: Silent; English intertitles

A Ridin' Romeo is a 1921 American silent Western film directed by George Marshall and starring Tom Mix, Rhea Mitchell and Eugenie Forde.

== Cast ==
- Tom Mix as Jim Rose
- Rhea Mitchell as Mabel Brentwood
- Pat Chrisman as Highlow, the Indian
- Sid Jordan as Jack Walters
- Harry Dunkinson as King Brentwood
- Eugenie Forde as Queenie Farrell
- Minnie Devereaux as Squaw

== Bibliography ==
- Connelly, Robert B. The Silents: Silent Feature Films, 1910-36, Volume 40, Issue 2. December Press, 1998.
- Munden, Kenneth White. The American Film Institute Catalog of Motion Pictures Produced in the United States, Part 1. University of California Press, 1997.
- Solomon, Aubrey. The Fox Film Corporation, 1915-1935: A History and Filmography. McFarland, 2011.
