= The Border Legion (1930 film) =

1930 film by Otto Brower

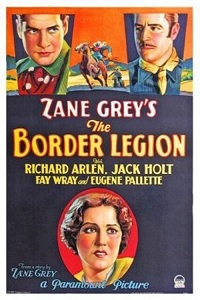
- Film poster
- Directed by: Otto Brower
- Written by: Edward E. Paramore Jr.
- Screenplay by: Percy Heath
- Based on: novel The Border Legion by Zane Grey
- Produced by: Paramount Publix
- Starring: Jack Holt, Fay Wray, and Richard Arlen
- Cinematography: Mack Stengler
- Edited by: Doris Drought
- Distributed by: Paramount Publix
- Release date: 1930
- Running time: 68 minutes
- Country: United States
- Language: English

The Border Legion is a 1930 American pre-Code Western film directed by Otto Brower. It stars Jack Holt, Fay Wray, and Richard Arlen. It is based on the 1916 novel of the same name by Zane Grey.

== Cast ==
- Jack Holt as Jack Kells
- Fay Wray as Joan Randall
- Richard Arlen as Jim Cleve
- Eugene Pallette as Bunco Davis
- Stanley Fields as Hack Gulden
- E. H. Calvert as Judge Savin
- Ethan Allen as George Randall
- Syd Saylor as Shrimp

== Production ==
The railroad scenes were filmed on the Sierra Railroad in Tuolumne County, California.

== See also ==
- The Border Legion (1918)
- The Border Legion (1924)
- The Last Round-Up (1934)
