= White Gold (1927 film) =

1927 film

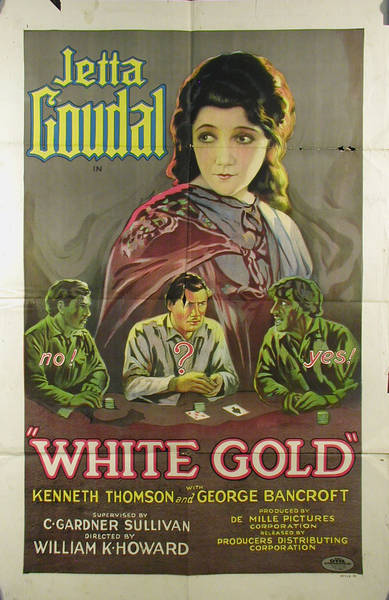
- Film poster
- Directed by: William K. Howard
- Written by: John Farrow (titles); Tay Garnett; Garrett Fort (adaptation)
- Based on: White Gold by J. Palmer Parsons
- Produced by: Cecil B. DeMille
- Starring: Jetta Goudal
- Cinematography: Lucien Andriot
- Edited by: Jack Dennis
- Distributed by: Producers Distributing Corporation
- Release date: February 24, 1927
- Running time: 1 hour, 13 minutes
- Country: United States
- Language: Silent (English intertitles)

White Gold (1927) by William K. Howard

White Gold is a 1927 American silent Western film produced and distributed by Cecil B. DeMille and directed by William K. Howard.

== Cast ==
- Jetta Goudal as Dolores Carson
- Kenneth Thomson as Alec Carson
- George Bancroft as Sam Randall
- George Nichols as Carson, Alec's Father
- Bob Perry as Bucky O'Neill (billed as Robert Perry)
- Clyde Cook as Homer

== Critical reception ==
Mordaunt Hall of The New York Times described the film as an "interesting production" that also had "marked simplicity" in terms of its story. Hall also said that "but for some repetitions, a few accentuated actions and instances of forced comedy, [it] would be one of the really great productions." The Ottawa Citizen said that, because of a new scripting technique employed by William Howard, "the film more closely approaches realism than anything ever before attempted in motion pictures." Philip K. Scheuer of the Los Angeles Times called it a "distinguished film" that employed the suggestion of sound by showing "creaking rockers, ticking clocks, the click of poker chips".

== Preservation ==
Prints of White Gold are located at the archives of the Centre national du cinéma et de l'image animée, Cinematek, Filmoteka Narodowa, BFI National Archive, and George Eastman Museum Motion Picture Collection.

== Bibliography ==
- "Screen Favors Realism". Montreal Gazette. February 12, 1927.
- "Theater Gossip". The Evening Independent. March 7, 1927.
