= The Border Legion (1940 film) =

1940 film by Joseph Kane

- Theatrical release poster
- Directed by: Joseph Kane
- Screenplay by: Olive Cooper; Louis Stevens
- Based on: The Border Legion by Zane Grey
- Produced by: Joseph Kane
- Starring: Roy Rogers; George "Gabby" Hayes; Carol Hughes; Joe Sawyer; Maude Eburne; Jay Novello
- Cinematography: Jack A. Marta
- Edited by: Edward Mann
- Music by: Milton Rosen
- Production company: Republic Pictures
- Distributed by: Republic Pictures
- Release date: December 5, 1940
- Running time: 58 minutes 54 minutes
- Country: United States
- Language: English

The Border Legion (TV edit: West of the Badlands) is a 1940 American Western film directed by Joseph Kane and written by Olive Cooper and Louis Stevens. It is based on the 1916 novel The Border Legion by Zane Grey. The film stars Roy Rogers, George "Gabby" Hayes, Carol Hughes, Joe Sawyer, Maude Eburne and Jay Novello. The film was released on December 5, 1940, by Republic Pictures.

== Cast ==
- Roy Rogers as Dr. Stephen Kellogg aka Steve Kells
- George "Gabby" Hayes as Honest John Whittaker
- Carol Hughes as Alice Randall
- Joe Sawyer as Jim Gulden
- Maude Eburne as Hurricane Hattie McGuire
- Jay Novello as Santos
- Hal Taliaferro as Sheriff Amos Link
- Dick Wessel as Oscar Red McGooney
- Paul Porcasi as Tony
- Robert Emmett Keane as Officer Willets

== Production ==
The Border Legion was edited for television to be 54 minutes in duration. The television title of this film is West of the Badlands.
