= The Thundering Herd (1925 film) =

1925 film by William K. Howard

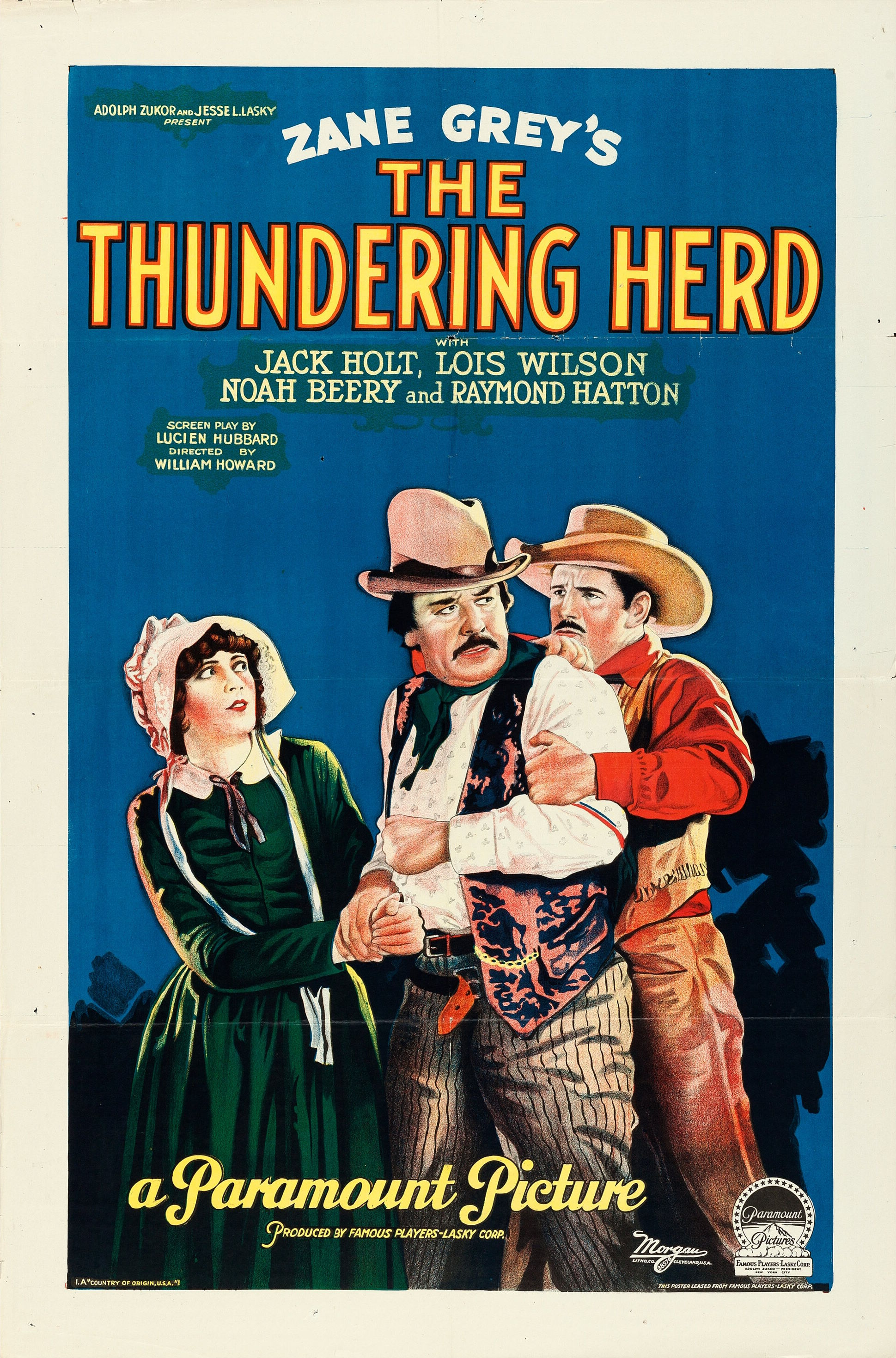
- Theatrical release poster
- Directed by: William K. Howard
- Written by: Lucien Hubbard
- Based on: The Thundering Herd by Zane Grey
- Produced by: Adolph Zukor; Jesse Lasky
- Starring: Jack Holt; Lois Wilson; Noah Beery Sr.; Raymond Hatton; Charles Ogle; Tim McCoy
- Cinematography: Lucien Andriot
- Production company: Paramount Pictures
- Distributed by: Paramount Pictures
- Release date: March 1, 1925 (US)
- Running time: 70 minutes (7 reels)
- Country: United States
- Languages: Silent; English intertitles

The Thundering Herd is a 1925 American silent Western film, now lost. It is directed by William K. Howard and starring Jack Holt, Lois Wilson, Noah Beery Sr. and Raymond Hatton. Based on Zane Grey's 1925 novel of the same name and written by Lucien Hubbard, the film is about a trader who uncovers a scheme to blame the Indians for a buffalo-herd massacre. It was one of a series of critically and commercially successful Zane Grey westerns produced by Jesse Lasky and Adolph Zukor for Paramount Pictures.

== Plot ==
Tod Doan, at the age of 24, is alone on a Kansas farm with nothing but an inheritance of $200. He spends the money on a gun and a horse, and joins a party of Buffalo hunters. They ride into Texas under the leadership of a plainsman named Hudnall. He meets Milly Fayre, played by Lois Wilson, ward of a crooked gambler named Jett who uses buffalo hunting as a pretext to cover his banditry. Milly falls in love with Doan and promises to marry him when she comes of age. Milly is taken to a freighting station to be safe from the Indians, while Tod hunts buffalo with the Hundall party. After Hundall is murdered by Indians, the buffalo hunters organize and drive the Indians from Texas. Later, Doan discovers that Jett has taken Milly away. Jett and his partners quarrel and shoot it out. All are killed. Terrified by the tragedy, Milly drives over the prairies toward the freighting station. She is spotted and pursued by Indians. She seems to have no chance of escape, until she notices a stamping herd of buffalo bearing down across the plain. If Milly can widen the distance between her and the Indians, there is a chance that the buffalo will cut off the Indians' pursuit.

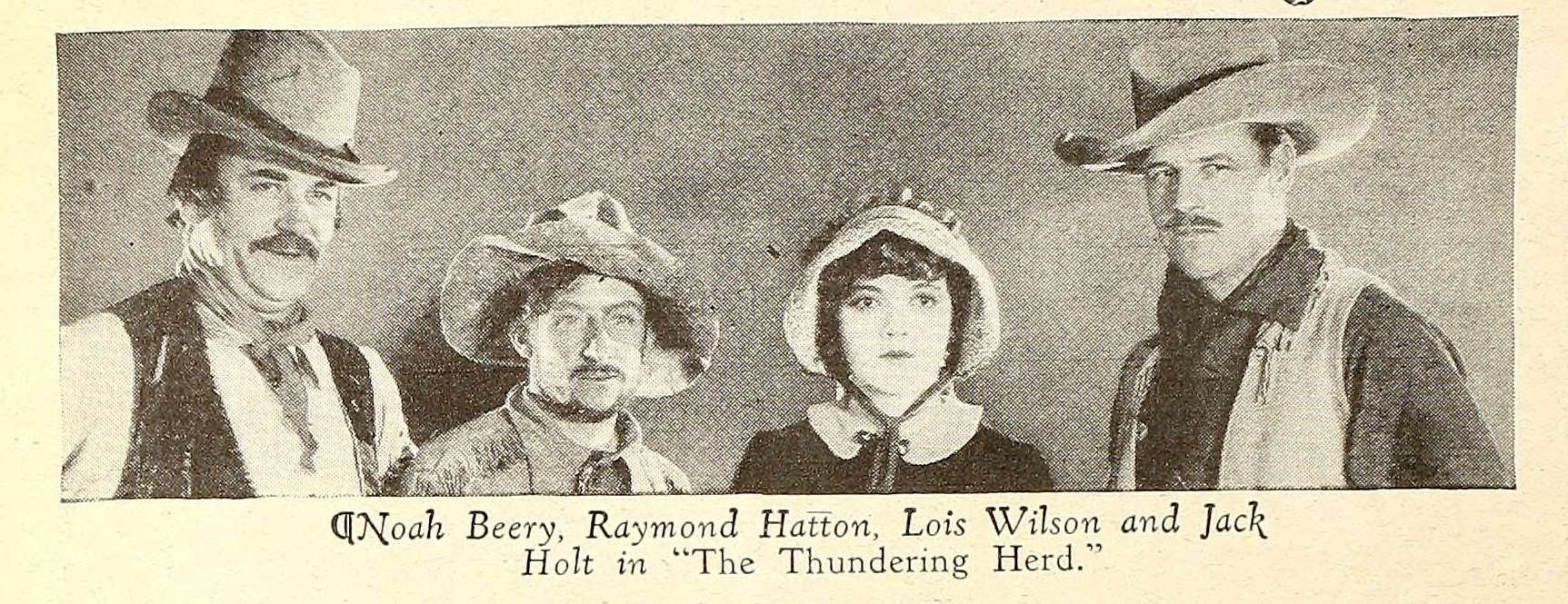
Stars, in character

== Cast ==
- Jack Holt as Tom Doan
- Lois Wilson as Milly Fayre
- Noah Beery Sr. as Randall Jett
- Raymond Hatton as Jude Pilchuk
- Charles Ogle as Clark Hudnall
- Tim McCoy as Burn Hudnall
- Lillian Leighton as Mrs. Clark Hudnall
- Eulalie Jensen as Mrs. Randall Jett
- Stephen Carr as Ory Tacks
- Maxine Elliott Hicks as Sally Hudnall
- Ed Brady as Pruitt
- Pat Hartigan as Catlett
- Fred Kohler as Follansbee
- Bob Perry as Joe Dunn
- Gary Cooper (uncredited)

Lists of Shoshone and Arapaho individuals who appeared in the film (and in The Covered Wagon) are held in the U.S. National Archives.

== Gallery ==
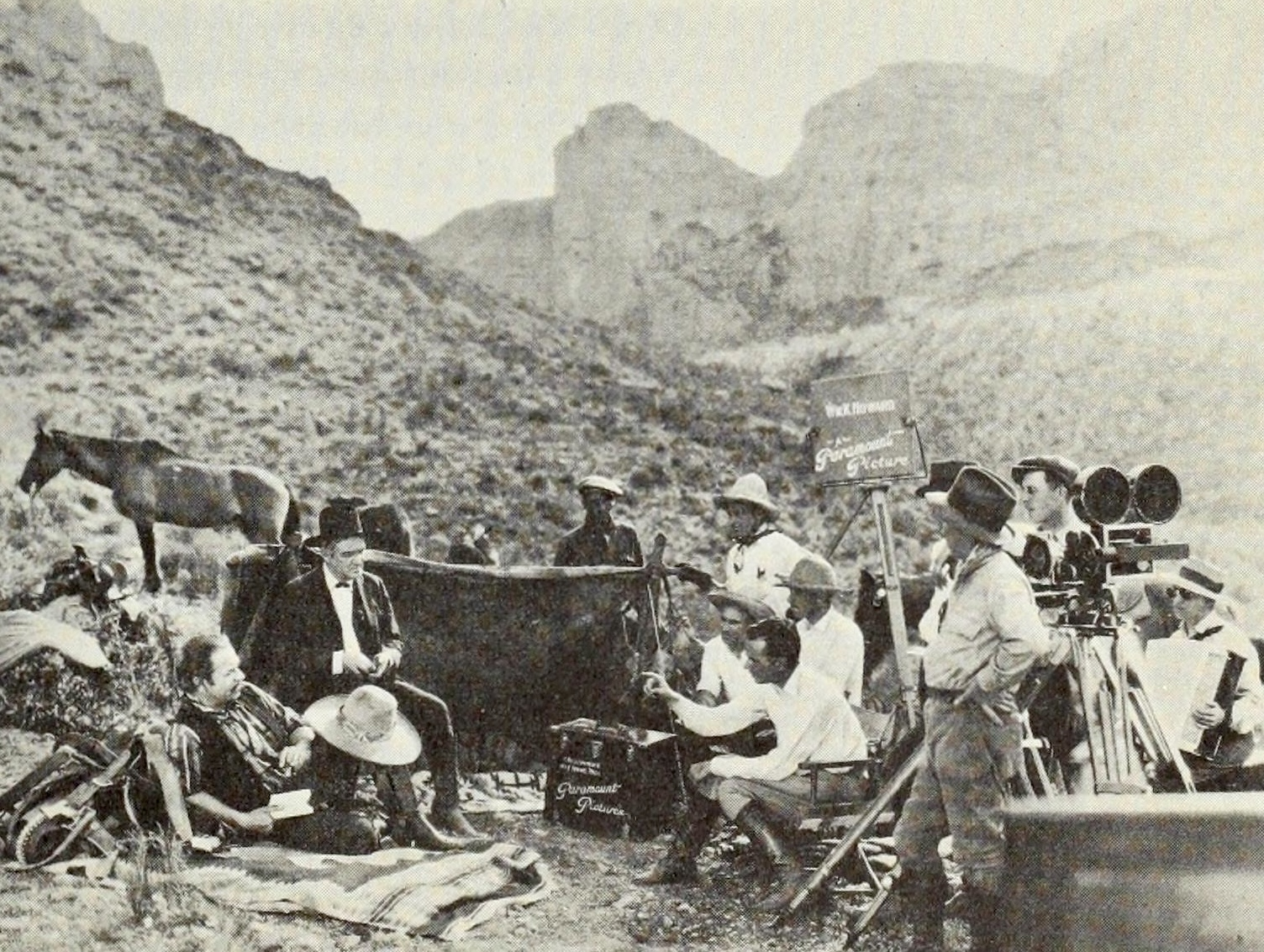
Publicity still of cast and crew on location

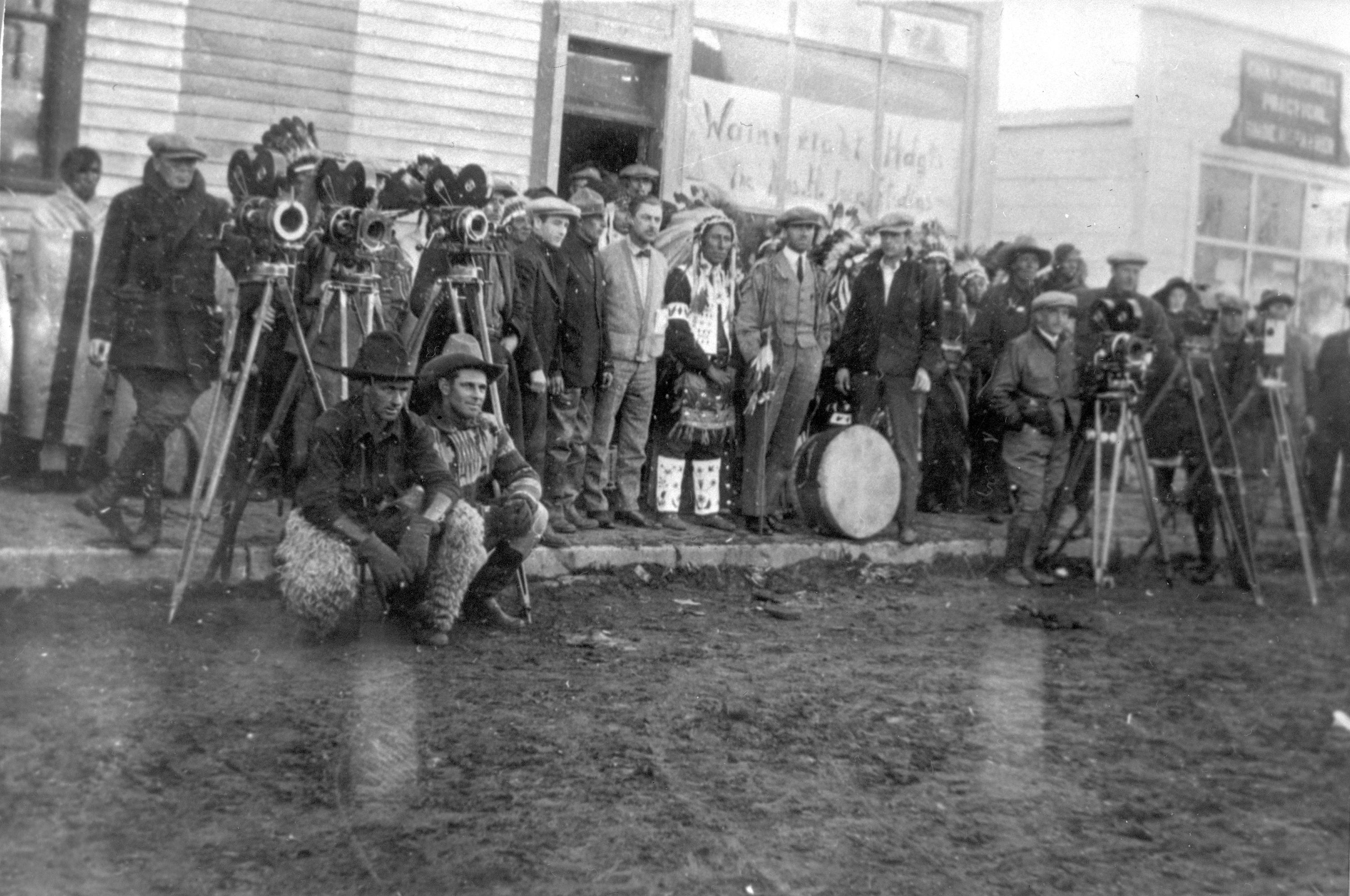
Cast and crew

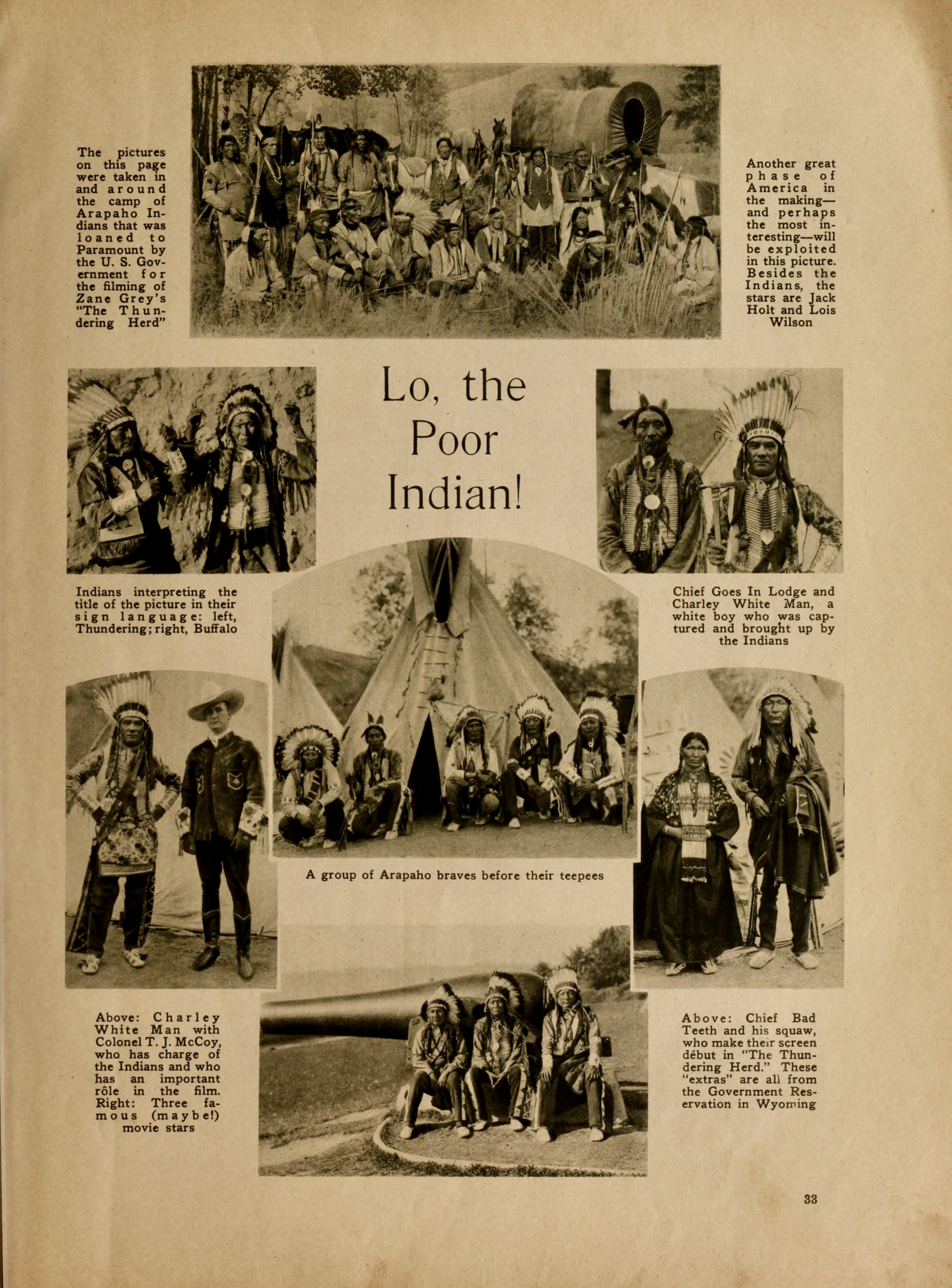
Arapaho cast members and Tim McCoy

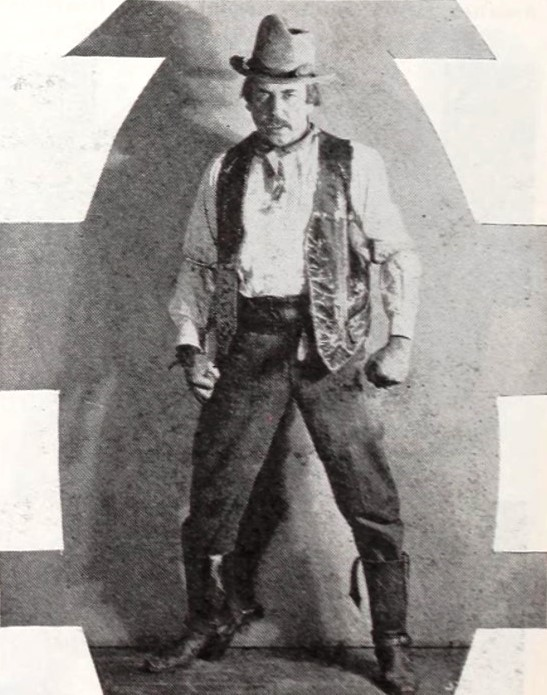
Noah Beery as Randall Jett

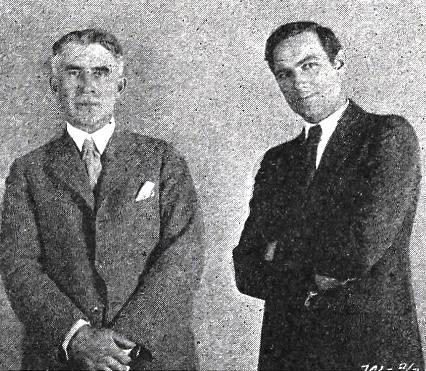
Author Zane Grey and screenwriter Lucien Hubbard

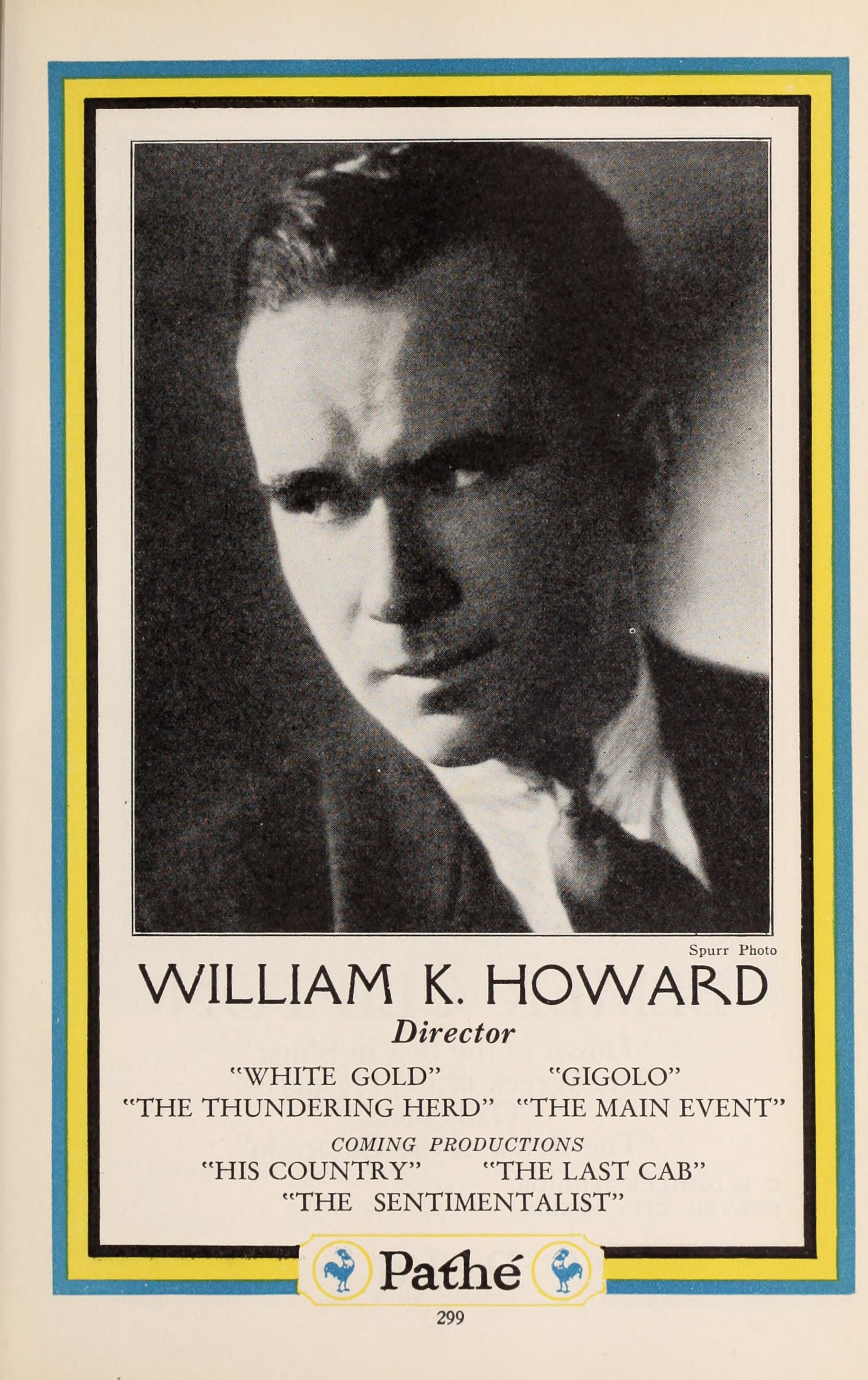
William K. Howard (1928)

== Context ==
- Jack Holt was the father of cowboy actor Tim Holt.
- Charles Ogle played the original screen Frankenstein's monster in Thomas Edison's 1910 version of Frankenstein, predating the Boris Karloff interpretation by more than two decades.
- The film was remade in a 1933 sound version, The Thundering Herd, with some of the cast (Beery and Hatton) playing the same parts but Randolph Scott playing Jack Holt's role, with Scott's hair darkened and a moustache added so as to match original footage featuring Holt that was incorporated into the later version to hold down costs.
- Noah Beery Sr. was the slightly older brother of fellow screen legend Wallace Beery and father of Noah Beery Jr. ("Rocky" in the 1970s television series The Rockford Files).
- Raymond Hatton was making a series of comedies as half of an unofficial comedy team with Noah Beery's brother Wallace Beery during this period.
- It was also from the novel on which this film is based that Marshall University took its unique nickname as the Thundering Herd.
- Tim McCoy directed the Native American actors.
- Gary Cooper appears in a small uncredited role.

== Production ==
- The silent black-and-white film is 70 minutes (seven reels, 7,187 feet).
- Filming locations included Yellowstone National Park, the Sierra Nevada mountains, and Calabasas, California. The Sierra Nevada shots, filmed somewhere near the state line, were for a blizzard sequence.
- The entire bison population of Yellowstone, some 2,000 individuals, was rounded up for use in the stampede scene.

== Reception ==
Variety compared the cinematography to the art of Frederic Remington. Mordaunt Hall of The New York Times also referenced Remington and wrote:

So far as the strong sequences are concerned, it is a work of art...but as a narrative this film is not particularly good...William Howard, the director, has adroitly made the most of his herds of buffalo in the exciting stampede scenes. He never gives you a chance to guess the number of animals, for just as you are going to make a quick calculation on comes a splendid close-up of the frightened bisons...In the fight between the redskins and the hunters there is a series of splendid scenes in which no opportunity is lost to make them thoroughly realistic. Horses and riders dash into the tops of wagons, while others fall as if shot. Indians riding at terrific pace clash with the white men, some crumpling and slipping from their horses. One has a glimpse of a battleaxe wielded by an Indian, who, just as he is about to strike a hunter, is himself felled to the ground...For miles and miles one cannot detect a single sign of modern days. There are trees, the snow covered plains, rocks and distant mountains. The Indians are first introduced illustrating their sign language, and when they communicate with each other at later stages prior to the conflict with the hunters, one gathers a vague idea of what they mean by their signs, as they make the most of plenty and death."

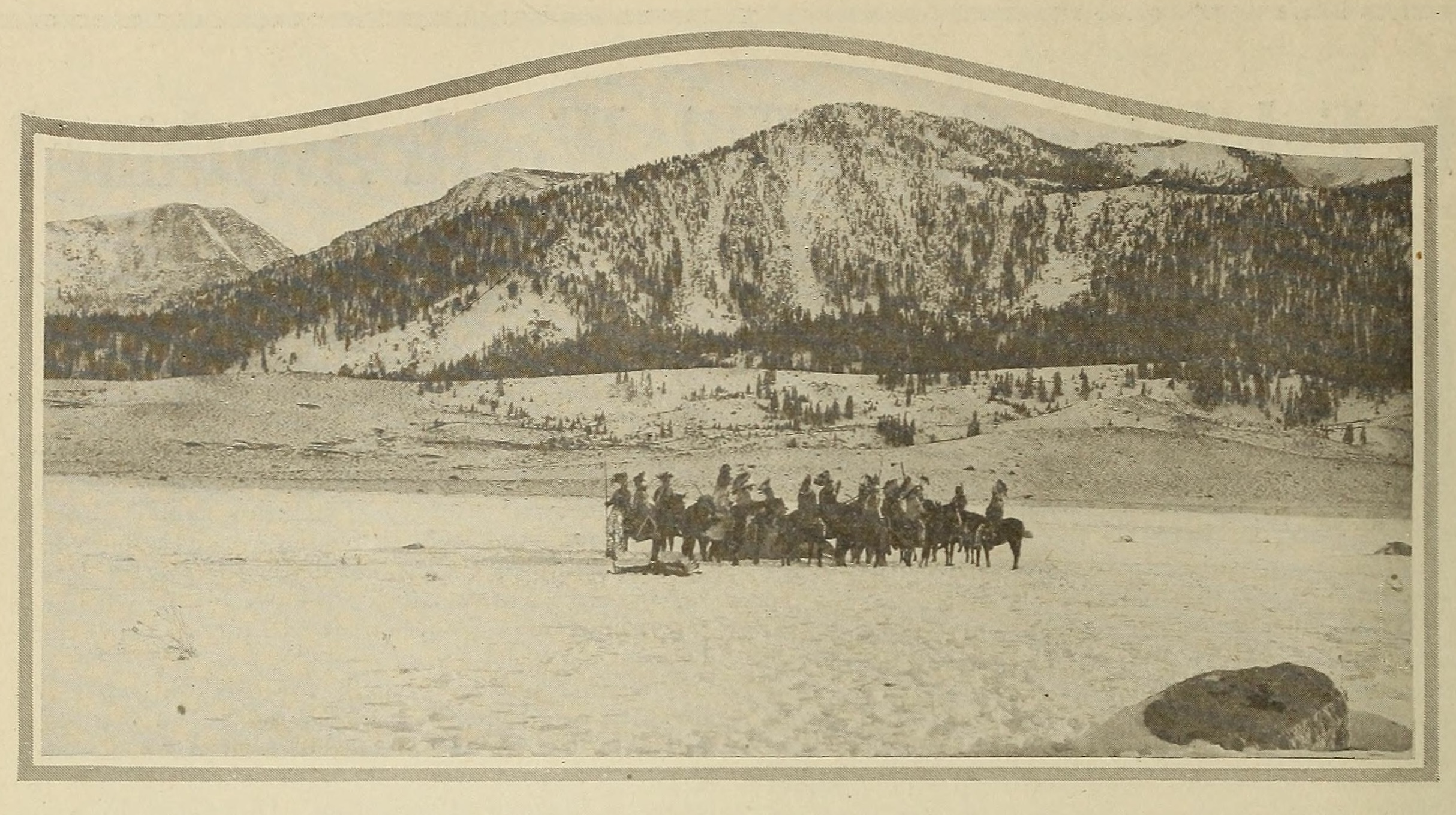
Location shot from The Thundering Herd, likely in Montana or Wyoming

Grace Kingsley in Los Angeles Times: The Thundering Herd is one of those pictures that after it has served its excellent purpose in the way of entertainment in this day, should be folded up and put away for colleges and high schools to look at fifty years from now. Perhaps never shall we again see another buffalo herd stampeding...never shall we again see a more interesting picture as regards an Indian pow-wow...certainly never shall we have so interesting an exhibition of universal Indian sign language as that in which these real braves of several tribes communicate with each other during their councils. These things are additionally interesting because they are vital part of absorbing story of The Thundering Herd.

Anges Smith in Picture Play:

Glorifying the American Buffalo: Just as The Miracle of the Wolves was an attempt to say a good word about Louis XI, so is The Thundering Herd a screen plea for kindness to the American buffalo which, it seems, got a raw deal from the white man and the so-called white man's civilization. And really it does seem a pity that there are now more jitneys than buffalo in the great open spaces...However, sentiment about the buffalo aside, The Thundering Herd is a wonderful picture. It is thrilling and beautiful and even if the story that it tells is just another one of those stories, the picture itself remains a glorious treat...The high spot of the film is a buffalo stampede with all the buffaloes played by real buffaloes and not just by cows wearing false faces and wigs. It is a great sight and one worth leaving the radio to witness.

== See also ==
- Wind River reservation
