= The Thundering Herd (1933 film) =

1933 film

- Theatrical release poster
- Directed by: Henry Hathaway
- Screenplay by: Jack Cunningham
- Based on: The Thundering Herd; 1925 novel by Zane Grey
- Produced by: Harold Hurley
- Starring: Randolph Scott; Judith Allen; Harry Carey; Buster Crabbe; Noah Beery, Sr.; Raymond Hatton
- Cinematography: Ben F. Reynolds
- Music by: Karl Hajos (uncredited)
- Production company: Paramount Pictures
- Distributed by: Paramount Pictures
- Release date: March 1, 1933 (US)
- Running time: 62 minutes
- Country: United States
- Language: English

The Thundering Herd is a 1933 American pre-Code Western film directed by Henry Hathaway and starring Randolph Scott, Judith Allen, Buster Crabbe, Noah Beery, Sr. and Harry Carey.

Based on the 1925 novel The Thundering Herd by Zane Grey, the film is about two bison hunters (portrayed by Randolph Scott and Harry Carey) who face dangers with the Native Americans and a gang of outlaws. The Thundering Herd is a remake of the 1925 film The Thundering Herd. Both Noah Beery, Sr. and Raymond Hatton, Wallace Beery's frequent screen comedy partner during the late 1920s, reprised their roles. Randolph Scott played Jack Holt's role, with Scott's hair darkened and a moustache added so as to match original footage featuring Holt that was incorporated into the later version to hold down costs. The 1933 film is now in the public domain and also known as Buffalo Stampede, the title Favorite Films used in their 1950 reissue of the film.

Hathaway directed much of the same cast (Scott, Beery, Carey and Crabbe) that same year in another Zane Grey story, Man of the Forest, and that same year a Zane Grey film with Scott, Beery, and Crabbe titled To the Last Man also starring Esther Ralston and featuring an unbilled Shirley Temple in an extremely memorable sequence. Hathaway also directed Scott, Beery and Carey in the Zane Grey opus Sunset Pass that same year.

== Cast ==
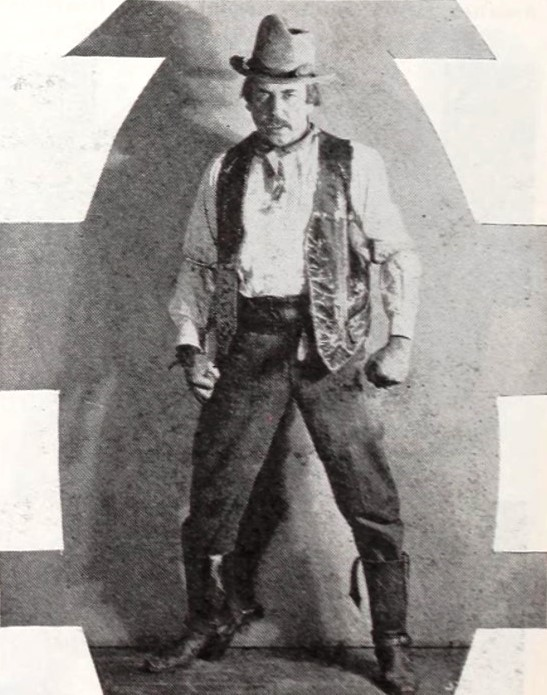
Noah Beery in the 1925 version

- Randolph Scott as Tom Doan
- Judith Allen as Millie Fayre
- Buster Crabbe as Bill Hatch, stagecoach driver
- Noah Beery, Sr. as Randall Jett
- Raymond Hatton as Jude Pilchuk
- Blanche Friderici as Mrs. Jane Jett
- Harry Carey as Clark Sprague
- Monte Blue as Smiley
- Barton MacLane as Pruitt

== Critical reception ==
Reporting that the "less ambitious silent version [of 1925] probably cleared more profit than this more costly production," a contemporary review in Variety noted for this film that "no little care has been exercised to keep the production accurate," that "[a]ction is helped by the fact that none of the players appears in most westerns," but that although "[p]roductionally this is a much better picture than the average western [...] it's a western and can't live it down."

== See also ==
- List of American films of 1933
