= The Border Legion =

Novel by Zane Grey

- Grosset & Dunlap book cover
- Author: Zane Grey
- Illustrator: Lillian E. Wilhelm
- Language: English
- Genre: Western
- Publisher: Harper & Brothers
- Publication date: 1916
- Publication place: United States
- Media type: Paper, 8vo
- Pages: 365

The Border Legion is a 1916 Western novel written by Zane Grey, first published by Harper & Brothers in 1916.

== Plot ==
It tells the story of a cold hearted man named Jack Kells who falls in love with Miss Joan Randle, a girl his legion has taken captive near the Idaho border.

== Adaptations ==
The Border Legion was adapted to film, in 1918, 1924, 1930, and in 1940. The film The Last Round-Up (1934) starring Randolph Scott, was also based on the novel.
