= William K. Howard =

American film director (1899–1954)

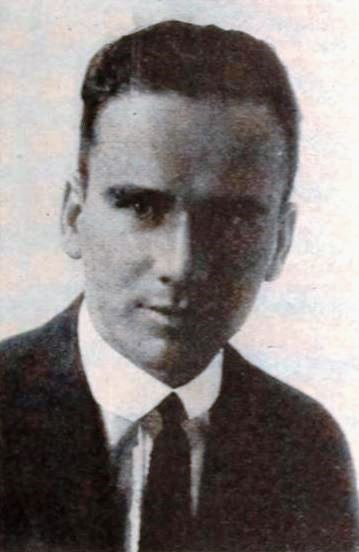
- from a 1920 magazine
- Born: June 16, 1899; St. Marys, Ohio, USA
- Died: February 21, 1954 (aged 54); Los Angeles, California, USA
- Occupations: Film director, writer, producer

William K. Howard (June 16, 1899 – February 21, 1954) was an American film director, writer, and producer. Considered one of Hollywood's leading directors at one point, he directed over 50 films from 1921 to 1946, including The Thundering Herd (1925), The Power and the Glory (1933), Fire Over England (1937), and Johnny Come Lately (1943).

== Biography ==
William K. Howard was born on June 16, 1899, in St. Marys, Ohio. After serving in Europe during World War I, he graduated from Ohio State University with a degree in engineering law.

In 1920, Howard began working in Hollywood as an assistant director on The Adorable Savage. The following year, at the age of twenty-two, he directed his first film, Get Your Man. That same year he directed two additional films—Play Square and What Love Will Do—and write The One-Man Trail. Throughout the 1920s and 1930s, Howard completing two or three films each year. In the 1920s his directorial work included The Border Legion (1924), The Thundering Herd (1925), White Gold (1927), The Valiant (1929), and Christina (1929). In the 1930s he directed such films as Sherlock Holmes (1932) and Rendezvous (1935).

Howard's 1933 film The Power and the Glory with Spencer Tracy was overlooked for decades, but in recent years it has received significant reappraisal due to recognition that the film was a major influence on the structure of Citizen Kane.

== Career changes ==
William K. Howard was one of several American directors invited to England to make films there; his most famous film of this period is Fire Over England (1937). Upon his return to America in 1939, he suffered the same fate as William Beaudine, another A-list director of the 1920s just back from England: he had trouble re-establishing himself in the American picture business. Howard co-wrote and directed a New York-made film drama, Back Door to Heaven (1939). This won him a berth at Warner Bros. in Hollywood, where he directed mostly low-budget crime stories. He began directing 1940's Knute Rockne, All American, but after a disagreement with the studio was replaced by Lloyd Bacon.

In 1942 Howard, unemployed, attempted a comeback at the low-budget Monogram Pictures. His friend Edmund Lowe, as a favor to Howard, agreed to take the leading role in Klondike Fury. This led to James Cagney hiring Howard to direct Cagney's first independent production, Johnny Come Lately (1943).

Howard made only two more films, both for small, independent companies. He withdrew from the industry in 1946.

== Personal life ==
Howard married his wife, Margaret Howard, in Las Vegas in 1949. He suffered from a throat malignancy, which started in 1953, and died in Los Angeles on February 21, 1954, at the age of 54.

On February 8, 1960, he was awarded the posthumous honor of a star on the Hollywood Walk of Fame, at 1500 Vine Street.

== Filmography ==
- Play Square (1921)
- Get Your Man (1921)
- What Love Will Do (1921)
- Deserted at the Altar (1922)
- Lucky Dan (1922)
- Captain Fly-by-Night (1922)
- Extra! Extra! (1922)
- Trooper O'Neill (1922)
- Let's Go (1923)
- The Fourth Musketeer (1923)
- Danger Ahead (1923)
- East of Broadway (1924)
- The Border Legion (1924)
- The Thundering Herd (1925)
- Code of the West (1925)
- The Light of Western Stars (1925)
- Red Dice (1926)
- Volcano! (1926)
- Gigolo (1926)
- Bachelor Brides (1926)
- White Gold (1927)
- The Main Event (1927)
- A Ship Comes In (1928)
- The River Pirate (1928)
- Sin Town (1929)
- Love, Live and Laugh (1929)
- The Valiant (1929)
- Christina (1929)
- Good Intentions (1930)
- Scotland Yard (1930)
- Transatlantic (1931)
- Surrender (1931)
- Don't Bet on Women (1931)
- The First Year (1932)
- Sherlock Holmes (1932)
- The Trial of Vivienne Ware (1932)
- The Power and the Glory (1933)
- The Cat and the Fiddle (1934)
- Evelyn Prentice (1934)
- This Side of Heaven (1934)
- Rendezvous (1935)
- Mary Burns, Fugitive (1935)
- The Princess Comes Across (1936)
- Fire Over England (1937)
- The Squeaker (1937)
- Over the Moon (1939)
- Back Door to Heaven (1939)
- Money and the Woman (1940)
- Knute Rockne, All American (1940)
- 'Til We Meet Again (1940)
- Bullets for O'Hara (1941)
- Klondike Fury (1942)
- Johnny Come Lately (1943)
- When the Lights Go On Again (1944)
- A Guy Could Change (1946)
