= Donald MacDonald (actor) =

American actor and director (1886–1972)

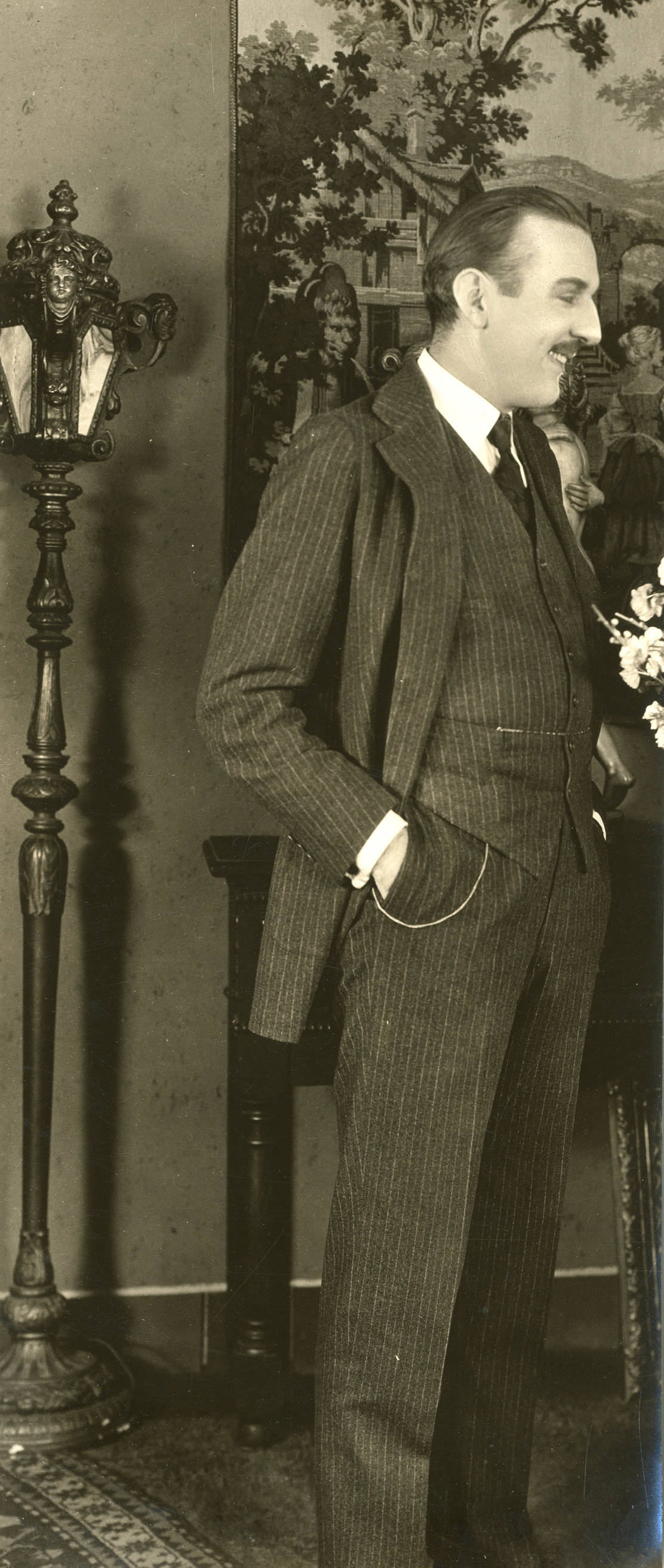
- Born: February 8, 1886; California, US
- Died: August 6, 1972 (aged 86); Los Angeles, California, US
- Years active: 1911–1934

Donald MacDonald (February 8, 1886 – August 6, 1972) was an American actor and director of the silent era. He appeared in more than 80 films between 1911 and 1934. He also directed 40 films between 1913 and 1917. He was born in California and died in Los Angeles, California.

== Partial filmography ==
- Almost a Rescue (1913)
- The Abandonment (1916 - directed)
- The Smugglers of Santa Cruz (1916 - directed)
- A Desert Wooing (1918)
- Who Cares? (1919)
- The Law of Men (1919)
- Silk Hosiery (1920)
- The Yellow Typhoon (1920)
- 45 Minutes from Broadway (1920)
- The White Dove (1920)
- The Woman in the Suitcase (1920)
- The Sky Pilot (1921)
- Greater Than Love (1921)
- A Midnight Bell (1921)
- Her Face Value (1921)
- The Woman He Married (1922)
- The Bootlegger's Daughter (1922)
- Lorna Doone (1922)
- Crashin' Thru (1923)
- Stepping Fast (1923)
- Another Man's Wife (1924)
- If Marriage Fails (1925)
- When Danger Calls (1927)
