= The Last Round-Up (1934 film) =

1934 film by Henry Hathaway

- Theatrical release poster
- Directed by: Henry Hathaway
- Screenplay by: Randolph Scott
- Based on: The Border Legion by Zane Grey
- Produced by: Harold Hurley
- Starring: Randolph Scott; Monte Blue; Barbara Fritchie
- Cinematography: Archie Stout
- Music by: Herman Hand
- Production company: Paramount Pictures
- Distributed by: Paramount Pictures
- Release date: May 1, 1934 (USA)
- Running time: 61 minutes
- Country: United States
- Language: English

The Last Round-Up is a 1934 American Pre-Code Western film directed by Henry Hathaway and starring Randolph Scott, Monte Blue, and Barbara Adams.

== Cast ==
- Randolph Scott as Jim Cleve
- Monte Blue as Jack Kells
- Barbara Adams as Joan Randall
- Fred Kohler as Sam Gulden
- Fuzzy Knight as Charles Bunko McGee
- Sam Allen as First Miner

== See also ==
- List of American films of 1934
