= List of Paramount Pictures films (1920–1929) =

The following is a list of films originally produced and/or distributed theatrically by Paramount Pictures and released in the 1920s.

== Key ==
#	Considered to be lost.

== 1920 ==
Release date	Title	Notes	Video if available
January 5, 1920	The Luck of the Irish^{#}		
January 11, 1920	The Woman in the Suitcase		
January 17, 1920	The Thirteenth Commandment^{#}		
January 18, 1920	The Tree of Knowledge^{#}		
January 25, 1920	The Copperhead		
January 25, 1920	The Fear Market^{#}		
January 25, 1920	What's Your Husband Doing?^{#}	incomplete 1 reel survives	
February 1, 1920	All of a Sudden Peggy^{#}	From the play by Ernest Denny	
February 1, 1920	Double Speed^{#}		
February 8, 1920	The Six Best Cellars^{#}		
February 15, 1920	On with the Dance^{#}		
February 22, 1920	The Amateur Wife^{#}		
February 29, 1920	Huckleberry Finn		
February 29, 1920	Judy of Rogue's Harbor^{#}		
February 29, 1920	Young Mrs. Winthrop^{#}		
February 29, 1920	Mary's Ankle		
March 7, 1920	Black Is White		
March 7, 1920	His House in Order^{#}		
March 14, 1920	Jack Straw		
March 14, 1920	My Lady's Garter^{#}		
March 14, 1920	Alarm Clock Andy^{#}	Distribution only; produced by Thomas H. Ince	
March 15, 1920	Sinners^{#}		
March 18, 1920	Dr. Jekyll and Mr. Hyde	Based on the novel by Robert Louis Stevenson	
March 21, 1920	Excuse My Dust		
March 21, 1920	April Folly		
March 21, 1920	Mary Ellen Comes to Town^{#}		
March 28, 1920	Easy to Get^{#}		
April 4, 1920	Nurse Marjorie		
April 4, 1920	The Stolen Kiss		
April 4, 1920	Treasure Island^{#}		
April 11, 1920	The Cost^{#}		
April 15, 1920	The Toll Gate		
April 18, 1920	The False Road		
April 30, 1920	Jenny Be Good^{#}		
April 1920	Terror Island		
May 2, 1920	The Dancin' Fool		
May 2, 1920	The Deep Purple^{#}		
May 9, 1920	Mrs. Temple's Telegram		
May 9, 1920	The Dark Mirror		
May 16, 1920	The Sea Wolf^{#}		
May 19, 1920	Miss Hobbs^{#}		
May 22, 1920	Why Change Your Wife?		
May 30, 1920	Humoresque	Inducted into the National Film Registry in 2015	
May 30, 1920	Thou Art the Man^{#}		
May 30, 1920	A Lady in Love^{#}		
June 13, 1920	Remodeling Her Husband^{#}		
June 13, 1920	Let's Be Fashionable^{#}		
June 20, 1920	The City of Masks^{#}		
June 20, 1920	Sand!		
June 27, 1920	Sick Abed		
June 27, 1920	Homer Comes Home		
June 1920	Paris Green		
June 1920	Below the Surface		
July 4, 1920	The Sins of St. Anthony^{#}		
July 11, 1920	The Ladder of Lies^{#}		
July 16, 1920	A Dark Lantern^{#}		
July 18, 1920	The World and His Wife^{#}		
July 1920	Away Goes Prudence^{#}		
August 1, 1920	The Fighting Chance		
August 1, 1920	Hairpins		
August 6, 1920	A Cumberland Romance		
August 8, 1920	Crooked Streets		
August 8, 1920	What Happened to Jones^{#}		
August 15, 1920	The Soul of Youth		
August 15, 1920	What's Your Hurry?		
August 22, 1920	Guilty of Love^{#}		
August 22, 1920	The White Circle^{#}		
August 29, 1920	Lady Rose's Daughter^{#}		
August 1920	The Prince Chap^{#}		
September 5, 1920	The Right to Love		
September 5, 1920	Civilian Clothes		
September 12, 1920	Food for Scandal^{#}		
September 12, 1920	The Village Sleuth		
September 12, 1920	The Restless Sex		
September 19, 1920	Little Miss Rebellion^{#}		
September 19, 1920	Half an Hour^{#}		
September 19, 1920	The Cradle of Courage		
September 22, 1920	You Never Can Tell		
September 1920	The Fourteenth Man^{#}		
September 1920	The Law of the Yukon^{#}		
September 1920	39 East^{#}		
October 10, 1920	The Jailbird		
October 10, 1920	Deep Waters^{#}		
October 10, 1920	Behold My Wife!^{#}		
October 17, 1920	Something to Think About		
October 17, 1920	A City Sparrow^{#}		
October 24, 1920	A Full House^{#}		
October 24, 1920	Held by the Enemy^{#}		
October 31, 1920	Eyes of the Heart^{#}		
October 31, 1920	An Old Fashioned Boy		
October 1920	Sweet Lavender^{#}		
November 7, 1920	The Sins of Rosanne	incomplete; missing reels 1 & 3	
November 11, 1920	Flying Pat		
November 12, 1920	The Frisky Mrs. Johnson^{#}		
November 13, 1920	Life^{#}		
November 14, 1920	Her Husband's Friend		
November 14, 1920	Always Audacious^{#}	Based on the story "Toujours de l'Audace" by Ben Ames Williams	
November 21, 1920	The Life of the Party		
November 21, 1920	Burglar Proof^{#}		
November 27, 1920	The New York Idea		
November 28, 1920	Idols of Clay		
November 28, 1920	Heliotrope^{#}		
November 1920	The Furnace^{#}		
November 1920	The Great Day^{#}		
November 1920	Oh, Lady, Lady^{#}		
November 1920	A Romantic Adventuress^{#}		
December 4, 1920	Blackbirds^{#}		
December 5, 1920	Conrad in Quest of His Youth		
December 10, 1920	Her Beloved Villain^{#}		
December 19, 1920	An Amateur Devil^{#}	Adapted from the story "Wanted a Blemish" by Jessie E. Henderson and Henry J. Buxton	
December 19, 1920	To Please One Woman^{#}		
December 26, 1920	The Rookie's Return		
December 26, 1920	Silk Hosiery		
December 26, 1920	The Testing Block		
December 1920	Her First Elopement		
December 1920	She Couldn't Help It^{#}		
December 1920	Something Different^{#}		

== 1921 ==
Release date	Title	Notes	Video if available
January 2, 1921	The Passionate Pilgrim	incomplete	
January 2, 1921	The Bait^{#}		
January 9, 1921	The Jucklins^{#}		
January 16, 1921	Paying the Piper^{#}		
January 16, 1921	The Inside of the Cup		
January 16, 1921	The Education of Elizabeth^{#}		
January 23, 1921	Forbidden Fruit		
January 23, 1921	Midsummer Madness		
January 28, 1921	Brewster's Millions^{#}		
January 30, 1921	Frontier of the Stars^{#}		
January 1921	The Charm School^{#}		
January 1921	The Snob^{#}		
February 6, 1921	O'Malley of the Mounted		
February 13, 1921	The Easy Road^{#}		
February 13, 1921	Chickens^{#}		
February 20, 1921	The Kentuckians^{#}		
February 20, 1921	All Soul's Eve^{#}		
February 27, 1921	What's Worth While?		
February 27, 1921	The Price of Possession^{#}		
February 1921	Ducks and Drakes		
February 1921	The Ghost in the Garret^{#}		
February 1921	Out of the Chorus^{#}		
February 1921	The Outside Woman^{#}		
February 1921	The Plaything of Broadway^{#}		
March 6, 1921	The Gilded Lily		
March 6, 1921	Straight Is the Way		
March 13, 1921	The Faith Healer^{#}		
March 20, 1921	The Love Special		
March 20, 1921	Beau Revel		
March 27, 1921	The Idol of the North^{#}		
March 1921	The Little Clown		
April 3, 1921	The Dollar-a-Year Man^{#}		
April 10, 1921	The Witching Hour		
April 10, 1921	Buried Treasure	incomplete	
April 14, 1921	The Whistle		
April 24, 1921	What Every Woman Knows^{#}		
April 24, 1921	The Home Stretch		
April 1921	The House That Jazz Built^{#}		
April 1921	The Magic Cup^{#}		
May 1, 1921	The City of Silent Men^{#}		
May 1, 1921	Proxies		
May 5, 1921	Sham^{#}		
May 8, 1921	The Lost Romance		
May 15, 1921	King, Queen, Joker^{#}	incomplete (fragment)	
May 21, 1921	Sheltered Daughters^{#}		
May 22, 1921	Too Wise Wives		
May 22, 1921	Sacred and Profane Love^{#}		
May 29, 1921	White and Unmarried^{#}		
May 29, 1921	Sentimental Tommy^{#}		
May 1921	Two Weeks with Pay^{#}		
June 5, 1921	Traveling Salesman		
June 5, 1921	Too Much Speed^{#}		
June 5, 1921	The Wild Goose		
June 12, 1921	Appearances^{#}		
June 12, 1921	A Private Scandal^{#}		
June 19, 1921	The Bronze Bell		
June 19, 1921	One a Minute		
June 26, 1921	A Wise Fool		
June 1921	Don't Call Me Little Girl^{#}		
June 1921	The March Hare^{#}		
July 3, 1921	The Woman God Changed	incomplete; 1 reel missing	
July 10, 1921	The Mystery Road^{#}		
July 14, 1921	Her Sturdy Oak^{#}		
July 19, 1921	A Heart to Let^{#}		
July 24, 1921	Behind Masks		
July 1921	A Kiss in Time^{#}		
July 1921	The Land of Hope^{#}		
July 1921	Little Italy^{#}		
July 1921	Moonlight and Honeysuckle^{#}		
July 1921	Such a Little Queen^{#}		
August 7, 1921	The Princess of New York^{#}		
August 14, 1921	At the End of the World		
August 14, 1921	Passing Through^{#}		
August 17, 1921	Room and Board^{#}		
August 20, 1921	Gasoline Gus		
August 21, 1921	Wealth^{#}		
August 21, 1921	Cappy Ricks		
August 21, 1921	The Conquest of Canaan		
August 28, 1921	Crazy to Marry		
August 1921	One Wild Week^{#}		
September 1, 1921	Footlights^{#}		
September 4, 1921	The Great Moment^{#}	incomplete (fragment)	
September 4, 1921	The Hell Diggers^{#}		
September 18, 1921	Dangerous Lies^{#}		
September 21, 1921	The Affairs of Anatol	Suggested by the play by Arthur Schnitzler;	
September 25, 1921	Everything for Sale^{#}		
September 1921	Her Winning Way^{#}		
October 9, 1921	The Great Impersonation^{#}		
October 9, 1921	The Case of Becky		
October 9, 1921	After the Show^{#}		
October 13, 1921	Her Face Value^{#}		
October 16, 1921	Three Word Brand		
October 16, 1921	Under the Lash^{#}		
October 16, 1921	Forever^{#}		
October 20, 1921	The Sheik		
October 23, 1921	Experience^{#}		
October 30, 1921	Beyond	incomplete 3 of the 5 reels survive	
October 30, 1921	Ladies Must Live^{#}		
October 30, 1921	Enchantment		
October 1921	Dawn of the East^{#}		
November 1, 1921	Miss Lulu Bett	Inducted into the National Film Registry in 2001	
November 6, 1921	Exit the Vamp^{#}		
November 13, 1921	Don't Tell Everything^{#}		
November 13, 1921	A Prince There Was^{#}		
November 27, 1921	The Call of the North^{#}		
November 27, 1921	The Bonnie Brier Bush^{#}		
November 1921	The Speed Girl^{#}		
November 1921	The Love Charm^{#}		
November 1921	Morals		
November 1921	Hush Money^{#}		
December 4, 1921	Get-Rich-Quick Wallingford^{#}		
December 9, 1921	Fool's Paradise		
December 11, 1921	Just Around the Corner		
December 18, 1921	White Oak		
December 25, 1921	The Little Minister		
December 1921	First Love^{#}	incomplete Reel 1 survives	
December 1921	A Virginia Courtship^{#}		

== 1922 ==
Release date	Title	Notes	Video if available
January 1, 1922	Rent Free^{#}		
January 1, 1922	Too Much Wife^{#}		
January 1, 1922	Three Live Ghosts		
January 8, 1922	Back Pay		
January 15, 1922	The Lane That Had No Turning^{#}		
January 22, 1922	The Law and the Woman^{#}		
January 22, 1922	Nancy from Nowhere^{#}		
January 22, 1922	The Bride's Play		
January 29, 1922	Tillie^{#}		
January 29, 1922	Saturday Night		
January 29, 1922	One Glorious Day^{#}		
January 1922	Her Own Money^{#}		
February 12, 1922	Boomerang Bill^{#}	incomplete	
February 12, 1922	Moran of the Lady Letty		
February 12, 1922	A Homespun Vamp^{#}		
February 19, 1922	Midnight^{#}		
February 19, 1922	Love's Boomerang^{#}		
February 19, 1922	Her Husband's Trademark		
February 25, 1922	The World's Champion^{#}	incomplete 3 of 5 reels survive	
February 26, 1922	A Game Chicken^{#}		
March 4, 1922	The Cradle		
March 5, 1922	Travelin' On		
March 12, 1922	Bobbed Hair^{#}		
March 18, 1922	Beauty's Worth		
April 2, 1922	The Green Temptation^{#}		
April 2, 1922	Through a Glass Window^{#}		
April 2, 1922	The Good Provider^{#}	Status unclear and disputed	
April 2, 1922	The Crimson Challenge^{#}		
April 2, 1922	Find the Woman	incomplete	
April 5, 1922	Her Gilded Cage^{#}		
April 9, 1922	The Heart Specialist^{#}		
April 9, 1922	The Sleepwalker^{#}		
April 10, 1922	The Spanish Jade^{#}		
April 16, 1922	Is Matrimony a Failure?^{#}		
April 23, 1922	The Truthful Liar^{#}		
April 29, 1922	The Bachelor Daddy^{#}		
April 30, 1922	The Man from Home		
May 7, 1922	Beyond the Rocks		
May 14, 1922	North of the Rio Grande^{#}		
May 14, 1922	The Beauty Shop^{#}		
May 12, 1922	Bought and Paid For^{#}		
May 21, 1922	The Ordeal^{#}		
June 4, 1922	Across the Continent^{#}		
June 4, 1922	Over the Border^{#}		
June 4, 1922	For the Defense		
June 11, 1922	The Woman Who Walked Alone		
June 14, 1922	Our Leading Citizen^{#}		
June 18, 1922	The Fast Freight^{#}		
June 18, 1922	The Top of New York^{#}		
June 22, 1922	The Dictator^{#}		
June 25, 1922	While Satan Sleeps^{#}		
July 2, 1922	The Man Unconquerable^{#}		
July 2, 1922	If You Believe It, It's So^{#}		
July 16, 1922	South of Suva^{#}		
July 30, 1922	Borderland^{#}		
July 30, 1922	Above All Law	US distribution only; produced in Germany by May-Film;	
August 5, 1922	Blood and Sand		
August 21, 1922	The Bonded Woman		
August 27, 1922	The Young Diana^{#}		
September 3, 1922	Nice People^{#}		
September 3, 1922	Burning Sands^{#}		
September 10, 1922	The Ghost Breaker^{#}		
September 10, 1922	The Valley of Silent Men	survives (incomplete)	
September 14, 1922	When Knighthood Was in Flower		
September 17, 1922	The Siren Call		
September 17, 1922	On the High Seas^{#}		
September 17, 1922	Missing Millions^{#}		
September 24, 1922	Pink Gods^{#}		
September 24, 1922	Manslaughter		
September 1922	Tell Your Children^{#}		
October 8, 1922	The Old Homestead		
October 8, 1922	The Face in the Fog	incomplete; reels 4-7 (of 7) survive	
October 15, 1922	Clarence^{#}		
October 15, 1922	The Cowboy and the Lady^{#}		
October 22, 1922	The Impossible Mrs. Bellew^{#}		
October 29, 1922	To Have and to Hold^{#}		
October 29, 1922	The Man Who Saw Tomorrow^{#}		
November 2, 1922	Peter the Great		
November 12, 1922	The Young Rajah	incomplete	
November 18, 1922	Ebb Tide^{#}		
November 19, 1922	Anna Ascends^{#}	incomplete (fragment)	
November 26, 1922	The Pride of Palomar		
November 26, 1922	Singed Wings^{#}		
December 4, 1922	A Daughter of Luxury^{#}		
December 10, 1922	Thirty Days^{#}		
December 10, 1922	Outcast^{#}		
December 17, 1922	Making a Man^{#}		
December 17, 1922	Kick In		
December 24, 1922	Back Home and Broke^{#}		
December 31, 1922	My American Wife^{#}		

== 1923 ==
Release date	Title	Notes	Video if available
January 14, 1923	Drums of Fate^{#}		
January 21, 1923	Dark Secrets^{#}		
January 28, 1923	Java Head^{#}		
January 28, 1923	Nobody's Money^{#}		
January 29, 1923	The World's Applause^{#}		
February 11, 1923	Adam and Eva^{#}	Distribution only; produced by Cosmopolitan Productions; incomplete (fragment)	
March 4, 1923	Adam's Rib		
March 4, 1923	The White Flower^{#}		
March 11, 1923	Grumpy		
March 16, 1923	The Covered Wagon		
March 18, 1923	The Tiger's Claw^{#}		
March 18, 1923	The Nth Commandment^{#}	incomplete	
March 19, 1923	Mr. Billings Spends His Dime^{#}		
March 23, 1923	The Leopardess^{#}		
March 25, 1923	The Glimpses of the Moon^{#}		
April 1, 1923	Bella Donna		
April 8, 1923	The Go-Getter^{#}		
April 15, 1923	The Trail of the Lonesome Pine^{#}		
April 15, 1923	Prodigal Daughters^{#}		
April 29, 1923	The Ne'er-Do-Well^{#}		
April 29, 1923	You Can't Fool Your Wife^{#}		
April 29, 1923	The Snow Bride^{#}		
May 13, 1923	The Rustle of Silk^{#}		
May 13, 1923	Sixty Cents an Hour^{#}		
May 23, 1923	Adam und Eva		
May 27, 1923	Fog Bound^{#}		
June 3, 1923	The Exciters^{#}		
June 10, 1923	The Heart Raider		
June 17, 1923	Only 38^{#}		
June 24, 1923	The Woman With Four Faces^{#}		
July 8, 1923	Children of Jazz^{#}		
July 15, 1923	Racing Hearts^{#}		
July 15, 1923	A Gentleman of Leisure^{#}		
July 22, 1923	Law of the Lawless^{#}		
July 22, 1923	Lawful Larceny^{#}		
July 29, 1923	Homeward Bound^{#}		
August 5, 1923	The Purple Highway^{#}		
August 19, 1923	Hollywood^{#}		
August 23, 1923	Bluebeard's 8th Wife^{#}		
August 26, 1923	Salomy Jane^{#}		
August 27, 1923	The Cheat^{#}		
September 11, 1923	The Flame^{#}	incomplete; (fragment)	
September 16, 1923	The Silent Partner^{#}		
September 16, 1923	Zaza		
September 23, 1923	To the Last Man		
September 23, 1923	The Marriage Maker^{#}		
October 7, 1923	Ruggles of Red Gap^{#}		
October 25, 1923	The Light That Failed^{#}		
October 28, 1923	Woman-Proof^{#}		
November 4, 1923	The Spanish Dancer		
November 4, 1923	His Children's Children^{#}		
November 18, 1923	Wild Bill Hickok		
November 18, 1923	Stephen Steps Out^{#}		
November 25, 1923	To the Ladies^{#}		
December 4, 1923	The Ten Commandments	One of Cecil B. DeMille's early screen epics. One scene is filmed in Technicolor. Remade in all Technicolor and in VistaVision in 1956;	
December 16, 1923	The Call of the Canyon		
December 23, 1923	Big Brother^{#}		
December 24, 1923	Don't Call It Love^{#}		
December 30, 1923	West of the Water Tower^{#}		

== 1924 ==
Release date	Title	Notes	Video if available
January 13, 1924	The Humming Bird		
January 23, 1924	The Heritage of the Desert	With Technicolor sequences;	
January 27, 1924	Flaming Barriers^{#}		
February 4, 1924	The Stranger^{#}		
February 4, 1924	Pied Piper Malone		
February 17, 1924	Shadows of Paris^{#}		
February 18, 1924	The Next Corner^{#}		
March 2, 1924	Icebound^{#}		
March 3, 1924	Singer Jim McKee		
March 9, 1924	A Society Scandal^{#}		
March 16, 1924	Fair Week		
March 30, 1924	The Fighting Coward		
April 14, 1924	The Dawn of a Tomorrow^{#}		
April 20, 1924	The Confidence Man^{#}		
April 24, 1924	Leap Year		
April 27, 1924	Triumph		
May 4, 1924	Men^{#}		
May 4, 1924	The Breaking Point		
May 12, 1924	Bluff		
May 19, 1924	The Moral Sinner^{#}		
June 2, 1924	Code of the Sea		
June 8, 1924	The Guilty One^{#}		
June 15, 1924	The Bedroom Window		
June 21, 1924	Wanderer of the Wasteland^{#}	Paramount's first all-Technicolor feature	
June 22, 1924	Unguarded Women^{#}		
June 22, 1924	Changing Husbands		
June 30, 1924	Tiger Love^{#}		
July 21, 1924	The Side Show of Life		
August 4, 1924	Manhandled		
August 11, 1924	Monsieur Beaucaire		
August 17, 1924	Empty Hands^{#}		
August 24, 1924	Lily of the Dust^{#}		
August 25, 1924	The Enemy Sex		
August 31, 1924	The Female^{#}		
September 15, 1924	The Man Who Fights Alone^{#}		
September 15, 1924	Sinners in Heaven^{#}		
September 22, 1924	The Alaskan^{#}	From the novel by James Oliver Curwood	
September 28, 1924	Feet of Clay^{#}		
September 29, 1924	The City That Never Sleeps^{#}		
October 6, 1924	Her Love Story^{#}		
October 13, 1924	Open All Night		
October 13, 1924	Dangerous Money^{#}		
October 19, 1924	The Border Legion^{#}		
October 20, 1924	The Fast Set^{#}		
October 27, 1924	The Story Without a Name^{#}		
October 28, 1924	Manhattan		
November 2, 1924	The Garden of Weeds^{#}		
November 3, 1924	Merton of the Movies^{#}		
November 10, 1924	Wages of Virtue^{#}		
November 17, 1924	A Sainted Devil^{#}		
November 24, 1924	Worldly Goods^{#}		
November 30, 1924	Forbidden Paradise		
December 15, 1924	Tongues of Flame^{#}		
December 22, 1924	North of 36		
December 29, 1924	Argentine Love^{#}		
December 29, 1924	Peter Pan	Based on the play by J.M. Barrie; Inducted into the National Film Registry in 2000	

== 1925 ==
Release date	Title	Notes	Video if available
January 5, 1925	Tomorrow's Love^{#}		
January 5, 1925	Locked Doors^{#}		
January 11, 1925	Too Many Kisses		
January 12, 1925	East of Suez^{#}		
January 19, 1925	A Man Must Live^{#}		
January 25, 1925	The Golden Bed		
January 26, 1925	Miss Bluebeard		
February 2, 1925	The Devil's Cargo^{#}		
February 2, 1925	Forty Winks^{#}		
February 9, 1925	The Top of the World^{#}		
February 15, 1925	Coming Through^{#}		
February 16, 1925	The Swan		
February 16, 1925	Contraband^{#}		
February 22, 1925	New Lives for Old^{#}		
February 25, 1925	The Shock Punch		
March 1, 1925	The Thundering Herd^{#}		
March 3, 1925	Salome of the Tenements^{#}		
March 16, 1925	The Air Mail	incomplete; 4 of the 8 reels survive	
March 20, 1925	Grass	Inducted into the National Film Registry in 1997	
March 22, 1925	Sackcloth and Scarlet^{#}		
March 23, 1925	Men and Women^{#}		
March 30, 1925	The Goose Hangs High^{#}		
March 30, 1925	The Dressmaker from Paris^{#}		
April 6, 1925	Code of the West^{#}		
April 6, 1925	A Kiss in the Dark	incomplete; 2 of the 6 reels survive	
April 14, 1925	Adventure^{#}		
April 19, 1925	The Charmer^{#}		
April 20, 1925	The Crowded Hour^{#}		
April 20, 1925	Madame Sans-Gêne^{#}	incomplete (fragment)	
April 27, 1925	The Night Club		
May 4, 1925	The Spaniard^{#}		
May 4, 1925	Any Woman^{#}		
May 11, 1925	Eve's Secret		
May 17, 1925	Welcome Home		
May 25, 1925	Old Home Week^{#}		
May 31, 1925	The Little French Girl^{#}		
June 14, 1925	Are Parents People?		
June 22, 1925	The Light of Western Stars^{#}		
June 29, 1925	Paths to Paradise	incomplete	
June 29, 1925	Marry Me^{#}		
June 1925	The Wanderer^{#}	incomplete	
July 6, 1925	The Manicure Girl^{#}		
July 13, 1925	Lost: A Wife^{#}		
July 13, 1925	The Lucky Devil		
July 27, 1925	Grounds for Divorce	incomplete missing reels 3	
August 3, 1925	Night Life of New York^{#}		
August 10, 1925	In the Name of Love^{#}		
August 17, 1925	Rugged Water^{#}		
August 23, 1925	The Man Who Found Himself^{#}		
August 24, 1925	Beggar on Horseback	incomplete	
August 24, 1925	The Street of Forgotten Men	incomplete; missing reel 2	
September 7, 1925	Not So Long Ago^{#}		
September 7, 1925	Wild, Wild Susan^{#}		
September 14, 1925	Wild Horse Mesa		
September 20, 1925	The Pony Express	incomplete	
September 21, 1925	The Coast of Folly^{#}		
September 28, 1925	The Trouble with Wives^{#}		
September 28, 1925	A Son of His Father^{#}		
October 5, 1925	The Golden Princess^{#}		
October 5, 1925	A Regular Fellow^{#}		
October 11, 1925	Lovers in Quarantine		
October 12, 1925	New Brooms^{#}		
October 15, 1925	The Vanishing American		
October 18, 1925	Flower of Night^{#}		
October 19, 1925	Seven Keys to Baldpate^{#}		
October 25, 1925	The King on Main Street	With Technicolor sequences	
November 8, 1925	The Ancient Highway^{#}		
November 15, 1925	Lord Jim		
November 16, 1925	Stage Struck	With Technicolor sequences;	
November 22, 1925	Irish Luck		
November 30, 1925	Cobra		
December 7, 1925	That Royle Girl^{#}		
December 22, 1925	A Kiss for Cinderella		
December 28, 1925	A Woman of the World		
December 28, 1925	The Best People^{#}		
December 28, 1925	Womanhandled		

== 1926 ==
Release date	Title	Notes	Video if available
January 4, 1926	The Splendid Crime^{#}		
January 7, 1926	Moana		
January 11, 1926	Mannequin		
January 14, 1926	Hands Up!	Inducted into the National Film Registry in 2005	
January 18, 1926	The Enchanted Hill^{#}		
January 31, 1926	The American Venus^{#}	With Technicolor sequences; incomplete (fragment)	
February 8, 1926	The Grand Duchess and the Waiter		
February 22, 1926	Behind the Front		
February 22, 1926	Sea Horses^{#}		
February 28, 1926	The Song and Dance Man	incomplete; missing reels 1 & 2 (of 7)	
March 1, 1926	Let's Get Married		
March 1, 1926	Dancing Mothers		
March 6, 1926	Desert Gold^{#}	Status unclear and disputed	
March 15, 1926	The New Klondike		
March 17, 1926	Fascinating Youth^{#}		
March 22, 1926	Miss Brewster's Millions^{#}		
March 22, 1926	The Untamed Lady^{#}		
March 27, 1926	The Crown of Lies^{#}		
March 29, 1926	A Social Celebrity^{#}		
April 1, 1926	For Heaven's Sake (Note: Owned by the estate of Harold Lloyd, with distribution rights currently licensed to Janus Films and The Criterion Collection)	Distribution only, produced by Harold Lloyd Corporation;	
April 4, 1926	The Blind Goddess^{#}		
April 5, 1926	The Runaway^{#}	incomplete	
April 17, 1926	Peter Vernon's Silence^{#}		
April 19, 1926	That's My Baby		
April 26, 1926	The Lucky Lady		
May 3, 1926	Wet Paint^{#}		
May 10, 1926	The Rainmaker^{#}		
May 16, 1926	Aloma of the South Seas^{#}	Based on the play by John B. Hymer and Leroy Clemens	
May 17, 1926	The Palm Beach Girl^{#}		
May 24, 1926	The Secret Spring		
May 24, 1926	It's the Old Army Game		
May 31, 1926	Say It Again^{#}		
June 7, 1926	Good and Naughty^{#}		
June 14, 1926	Born to the West^{#}		
June 27, 1926	Variety	US distribution only, produced in Germany by UFA	
June 1926	Volcano!		
July 18, 1926	Nell Gwyn		
July 24, 1926	Mantrap		
August 2, 1926	Padlocked		
August 16, 1926	The Show-Off		
August 25, 1926	Beau Geste		
August 29, 1926	The Cat's Pajamas^{#}		
August 29, 1926	Fine Manners		
September 5, 1926	Love 'Em and Leave 'Em		
September 18, 1926	The Campus Flirt^{#}		
September 19, 1926	Tin Gods^{#}		
September 20, 1926	You Never Know Women		
September 20, 1926	Diplomacy		
September 25, 1926	You'd Be Surprised		
September 27, 1926	Forlorn River^{#}		
September 27, 1926	Hold That Lion		
October 4, 1926	Kid Boots		
October 11, 1926	The Ace of Cads^{#}		
October 11, 1926	The Quarterback		
October 12, 1926	The Sorrows of Satan		
October 18, 1926	The Eagle of the Sea		
October 25, 1926	So's Your Old Man	Inducted into the National Film Registry in 2008	
October 1926	London^{#}		
November 1, 1926	The Lady of the Harem^{#}		
November 6, 1926	We're in the Navy Now		
November 8, 1926	Everybody's Acting^{#}		
November 20, 1926	God Gave Me Twenty Cents^{#}		
November 21, 1926	The Great Gatsby^{#}	incomplete (fragment)	
November 22, 1926	The Popular Sin^{#}	incomplete (fragment)	
November 27, 1926	The Canadian		
December 6, 1926	Old Ironsides		
December 13, 1926	Stranded in Paris^{#}		
December 27, 1926	Man of the Forest^{#}		

== 1927 ==
Release date	Title	Notes	Video if available
January 1, 1927	Hotel Imperial		
January 8, 1927	Blonde or Brunette		
January 15, 1927	The Potters#		
January 22, 1927	The Kid Brother	Distribution only, produced by Harold Lloyd Corporation;	
January 23, 1927	Paradise for Two^{#}		
January 30, 1927	New York^{#}		
February 12, 1927	Let It Rain^{#}		
February 19, 1927	It	Inducted into the National Film Registry in 2001	
February 20, 1927	Love's Greatest Mistake^{#}		
February 22, 1927	A Kiss in a Taxi^{#}		
February 26, 1927	Blind Alleys^{#}		
February 28, 1927	Stark Love	Inducted into the National Film Registry in 2009	
March 5, 1927	The Mysterious Rider^{#}		
March 8, 1927	Casey at the Bat		
March 13, 1927	Metropolis	US distribution only, produced in Germany by UFA;	
March 19, 1927	Evening Clothes^{#}		
March 26, 1927	Fashions for Women^{#}		
March 26, 1927	Cabaret^{#}		
March 27, 1927	The Telephone Girl		
April 2, 1927	Too Many Crooks#	First film released after the name change to "Paramount Famous Lasky Corporation."	
April 9, 1927	Afraid to Love^{#}		
April 9, 1927	Ritzy^{#}		
April 9, 1927	Arizona Bound^{#}		
April 16, 1927	Knockout Reilly^{#}		
April 25, 1927	Children of Divorce		
April 29, 1927	Chang: A Drama of the Wilderness		
April 30, 1927	Senorita		
April 30, 1927	The Whirlwind of Youth^{#}		
May 6, 1927	Special Delivery		
May 7, 1927	Wedding Bills^{#}		
May 14, 1927	Rough House Rosie^{#}	Aside from known surviving trailer Additional scenes did turn up in a 2012 documentary "Clara Bow - Hollywood's Lost Screen Goddess" though the tatus of the full version hasn't been confirmed yet.	
June 4, 1927	Drums of the Desert^{#}		
June 11, 1927	Running Wild		
June 18, 1927	Rolled Stockings#		
June 18, 1927	Time to Love#		
June 19, 1927	Tip Toes#		
June 25, 1927	The Way of All Flesh#	incomplete (fragment)	
July 2, 1927	The Last Outlaw		
July 9, 1927	Man Power#		
July 27, 1927	Ten Modern Commandments#		
August 1, 1927	Nevada		
August 1, 1927	Madame Pompadour		
August 1, 1927	Fireman, Save My Child		
August 6, 1927	Service for Ladies#		
August 12, 1927	Wings	Synchronized Score and Sound Effects released on January 5, 1929; inaugural winner of the Academy Award for Best Picture; Inducted into the National Film Registry in 1997	
August 20, 1927	Underworld		
August 27, 1927	Soft Cushions#		
August 27, 1927	Hula		
September 3, 1927	We're All Gamblers#		
September 3, 1927	Swim Girl, Swim#		
September 10, 1927	Barbed Wire		
September 17, 1927	One Woman to Another#		
September 24, 1927	Tell It to Sweeney		
October 1, 1927	A Gentleman of Paris		
October 1, 1927	The Rough Riders	incomplete	
October 8, 1927	Figures Don't Lie#		
October 8, 1927	Shootin' Irons		
October 15, 1927	Shanghai Bound#		
October 15, 1927	Jesse James#	Status unclear and disputed	
October 22, 1927	Now We're in the Air	incomplete 23 minutes survive	
October 29, 1927	The Woman on Trial#	incomplete (fragments)	
November 5, 1927	Open Range#		
November 12, 1927	The City Gone Wild#		
November 12, 1927	She's a Sheik		
November 13, 1927	The Last Waltz	US distribution only, produced in Germany by UFA;	
November 19, 1927	The Spotlight#		
December 3, 1927	Honeymoon Hate#		
December 7, 1927	Get Your Man	incomplete reels 2 & 3 are lost	
December 10, 1927	The Gay Defender#		
December 17, 1927	Two Flaming Youths#		
December 24, 1927	Serenade#		

== 1928 ==
Release date	Title	Notes	Video if available
January 7, 1928	Wife Savers#		
January 14, 1928	Love and Learn#		
January 21, 1928	The Pioneer Scout#		
January 21, 1928	The Last Command	Inducted into the National Film Registry in 2006	
January 22, 1928	Gentlemen Prefer Blondes#		
January 22, 1928	Beau Sabreur#	incomplete trailer (fragment) survives	
February 4, 1928	The Secret Hour#		
February 11, 1928	Sporting Goods#		
February 18, 1928	Doomsday		
February 25, 1928	The Showdown		
February 26, 1928	Feel My Pulse		
March 3, 1928	Tillie's Punctured Romance#		
March 10, 1928	The Legion of the Condemned#		
March 10, 1928	Red Hair#	One Technicolor sequence; incomplete (fragment)	
March 17, 1928	Partners in Crime		
March 24, 1928	Something Always Happens#		
March 31, 1928	Adventure Mad	US distribution only; produced in Germany by UFA	
April 7, 1928	Speedy	Part Talkie version released on December 15, 1928; Distribution only, produced by Harold Lloyd Corporation.	
April 7, 1928	A Night of Mystery#		
April 14, 1928	Three Sinners#		
April 19, 1928	Abie's Irish Rose	Part Talkie released on November 3, 1928 incomplete	
April 21, 1928	The Sunset Legion#		
April 21, 1928	Easy Come, Easy Go#		
May 12, 1928	The Fifty-Fifty Girl#		
May 26, 1928	The Drag Net#		
May 26, 1928	The Street of Sin#		
May 27, 1928	His Tiger Lady#		
June 2, 1928	The Magnificent Flirt#		
June 11, 1928	Fools For Luck#		
June 16, 1928	Half a Bride#		
June 17, 1928	Ladies of the Mob#		
June 23, 1928	The Vanishing Pioneer#		
June 23, 1928	Kit Carson		
July 1, 1928	The Big Killing		
July 14, 1928	Hot News#		
July 15, 1928	Warming Up#	Paramount's first feature with synchronized score and sound effects.	
July 21, 1928	The Mating Call		
July 29, 1928	Loves of an Actress#	Synchronized Score and Sound Effects	
August 5, 1928	Forgotten Faces		
August 18, 1928	Just Married#		
August 19, 1928	The Patriot#	Paramount's first part-talking feature; nominee for the Academy Award for Best Picture incomplete (fragment)	
August 25, 1928	The Water Hole#	Two-color Technicolor sequences.	
August 25, 1928	The First Kiss#	Synchronized Score and Sound Effects	
August 29, 1928	Homecoming	Synchronized Score and Sound Effects version released on February 16, 1929; US distribution only, produced in Germany by UFA	
September 1, 1928	The Sawdust Paradise#	Synchronized Score and Sound Effects	
September 15, 1928	The Fleet's In#		
September 22, 1928	Beggars of Life	Part Talkie; Picture survives but sound for reels 2-9 are lost	
September 29, 1928	The Docks of New York	Inducted into the National Film Registry in 1999	
October 6, 1928	The Wedding March	Synchronized Score and Sound Effects Inducted into the National Film Registry in 2003	
October 13, 1928	Moran of the Marines#		
October 13, 1928	Take Me Home#		
October 27, 1928	Varsity#	Part Talkie	
November 1, 1928	The Racket	nominee for the Academy Award for Best Picture	
November 3, 1928	The Woman from Moscow	Synchronized Score and Sound Effects: incomplete; reels 4, 6, and 7 held in Lobster films, Status Unclear following 2020 incident	
November 10, 1928	Avalanche#	Last film in the pre-1929 library owned by Paramount themselves	
November 16, 1928	Interference	Paramount's first 100% all-talking picture. First film in the post-1928 and pre-1950 library owned by Universal Television via EMKA, Ltd.	
November 17, 1928	His Private Life#	Synchronized Score and Sound effects	
November 24, 1928	Manhattan Cocktail#	Part Talkie incomplete (fragment)	
December 1, 1928	Someone to Love#		
December 8, 1928	Three Week-Ends#	incomplete (fragment)	
December 22, 1928	What a Night!#		
December 29, 1928	Sins of the Fathers	Part Talkie	
December 29, 1928	The Shopworn Angel	Part Talkie incomplete missing reels 7 & 8	

== 1929 ==
Release date	Title	Notes	Video if available
January 12, 1929	Behind the German Lines	Synchronized Score and Sound Effects; German documentary about World War I, produced by Ufa.	
January 19, 1929	The Case of Lena Smith#	incomplete (fragment)	
January 26, 1929	The Doctor's Secret#	All Talking	
January 27, 1929	Marquis Preferred		
February 2, 1929	The Wolf of Wall Street#	All Talking incomplete (fragment)	
February 9, 1929	Sunset Pass#		
February 16, 1929	The Canary Murder Case	All Talking	
February 23, 1929	Redskin	Synchronized Score and Sound Effects. Two-color Technicolor sequences.	
March 2, 1929	The Carnation Kid	Part Talkie	
March 9, 1929	The Dummy	All Talking	
March 16, 1929	Looping the Loop#	Synchronized Score and Sound Effects. German film, produced by Ufa.	
March 17, 1929	The Letter (Note: Owned by Warner Bros.)	All Talking	
March 30, 1929	Chinatown Nights	All Talking	
March 30, 1929	Wolf Song	Part Talkie	
April 6, 1929	The Wild Party	All Talking	
April 13, 1929	Close Harmony	All Talking	
April 20, 1929	Nothing But the Truth	All Talking	
April 27, 1929	The Hole in the Wall	All Talking	
April 28, 1929	Betrayal#	Synchronized Score and Sound Effects	
May 1, 1929	The Silver King		
May 4, 1929	Gentlemen of the Press	All Talking	
May 16, 1929	A Dangerous Woman	All Talking	
May 16, 1929	The Rainbow Man	All Talking	
May 25, 1929	The Man I Love	All Talking	
May 25, 1929	Innocents of Paris	All Talking	
June 1, 1929	The Studio Murder Mystery	All Talking	
June 8, 1929	Stairs of Sand#		
June 12, 1929	The Four Feathers	Synchronized Score and Sound Effects.	
June 15, 1929	The Wheel of Life	All Talking	
June 20, 1929	Thunderbolt	All Talking	
June 29, 1929	River of Romance	All Talking	
June 29, 1929	Fashions in Love	All Talking	
July 6, 1929	Divorce Made Easy	All Talking	
July 13, 1929	Dangerous Curves	All Talking	
August 3, 1929	The Cocoanuts	All Talking	
August 3, 1929	Hungarian Rhapsody	Synchronized Score and Sound Effects. German film, produced by ufa incomplete.	
August 10, 1929	The Mysterious Dr. Fu Manchu	All Talking	
August 11, 1929	The Greene Murder Case	All Talking	
August 16, 1929	The Dance of Life	All Talking. Two-color Technicolor sequences.	
August 17, 1929	Charming Sinners	All Talking	
August 24, 1929	The Soul of France#	Synchronized Score and Sound Effects	
September 13, 1929	Jealousy#	All Talking	
September 14, 1929	Fast Company	All Talking; Incomplete	
September 21, 1929	The Lady Lies	All Talking	
September 21, 1929	Illusion	All Talking	
September 28, 1929	Woman Trap	All Talking	
October 4, 1929	Why Bring That Up?	All Talking	
October 5, 1929	The Love Doctor	All Talking; Incomplete, Missing Sound Discs 2&4	
October 7, 1929	Applause	All Talking	
October 12, 1929	Welcome Danger	All Talking; produced by Harold Lloyd Corporation	
October 25, 1929	The Saturday Night Kid	All Talking	
October 26, 1929	The Return of Sherlock Holmes	All Talking; Picture Survives, Sound is Lost	
November 2, 1929	Sweetie	All Talking	
November 9, 1929	The Virginian	All Talking	
November 16, 1929	The Mighty	All Talking	
November 23, 1929	Darkened Rooms	All Talking	
November 30, 1929	The Battle of Paris	All Talking	
December 7, 1929	Glorifying the American Girl	All Talking. Two-color Technicolor sequences.	
December 21, 1929	The Marriage Playground	All Talking	
December 21, 1929	Half Way to Heaven	All Talking	
December 21, 1929	Pointed Heels	All Talking. Two-color Technicolor sequences.	
December 28, 1929	The Laughing Lady	All Talking	
