= Wandering Fires =

1925 film

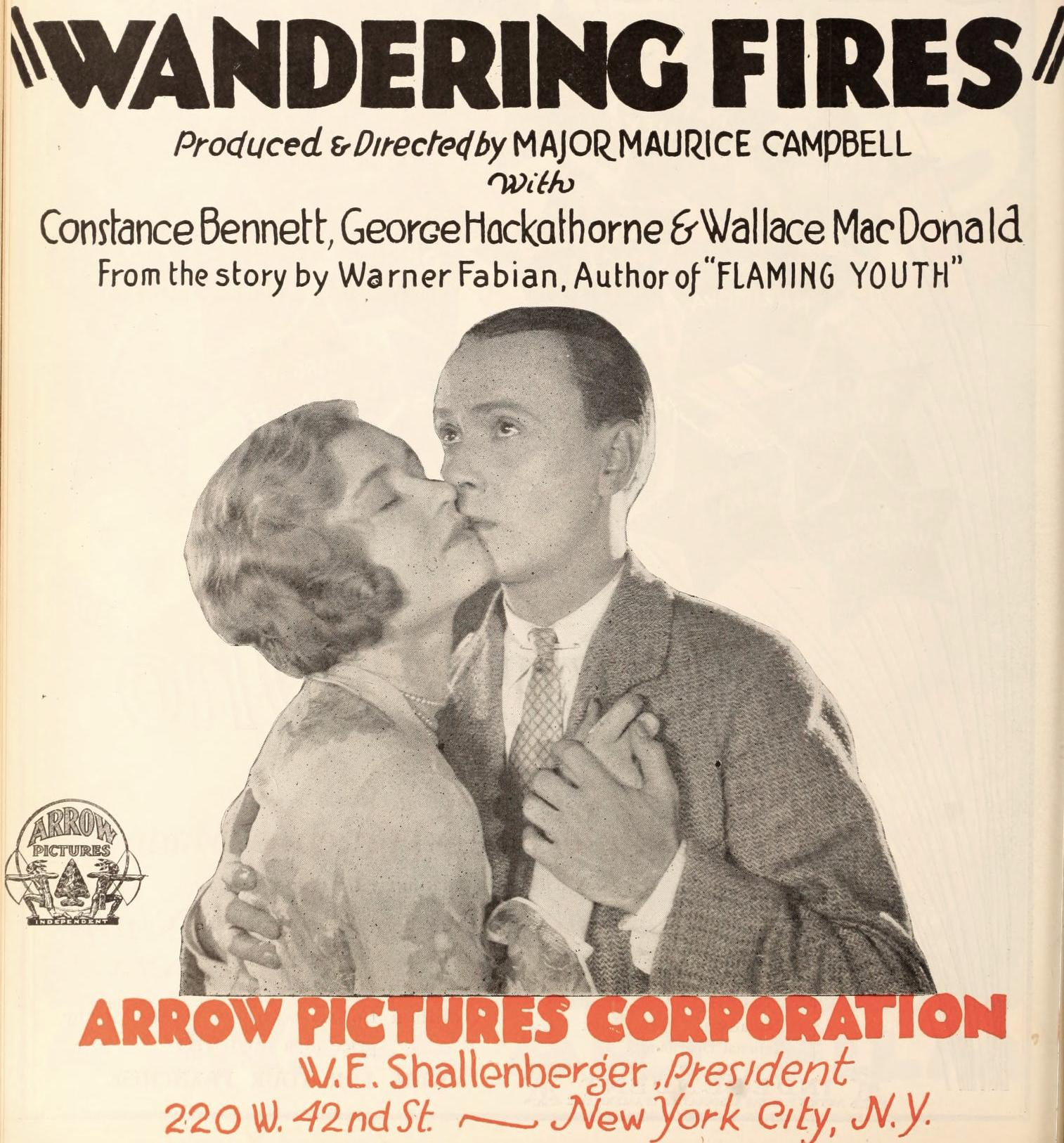
- Contemporary advertisement
- Directed by: Maurice Campbell
- Written by: Samuel Hopkins Adams (story) (*as Warner Fabian)
- Produced by: Maurice Campbell
- Starring: Constance Bennett
- Cinematography: Harry Stradling
- Distributed by: Arrow Film Corporation (US); Film Booking Offices of America (UK; 1926)
- Release date: September 15, 1925
- Running time: 6 reels
- Country: United States
- Language: Silent (English intertitles)

Wandering Fires is a 1925 American silent drama film produced and directed by Maurice Campbell and stars Constance Bennett. It was distributed in the United States by Arrow Film Corporation and in the United Kingdom by Film Booking Offices of America. Campbell's wife, stage star Henrietta Crosman, appears in the film.

== Plot ==
As described in a film magazine review, a young woman who is the victim of a scandalous tale involving her lover, who is believed killed in France during the World War, is loved by another young man who, knowing the tale, still urges her to marry him. After they are married, the husband becomes jealous of the lost lover, who one day turns up with an arm gone and his mind a blank from shell shock. His mental balance is restored, however, and he absolves his former sweetheart of any wrongdoing. Thereafter, the husband and wife are happy again.

== Cast ==
- Constance Bennett as Guerda Anthony
- George Hackathorne as Raymond Carroll
- Wallace MacDonald as Norman Yuell
- Effie Shannon as Mrs. Satorius
- Henrietta Crosman as Mrs. Carroll

== Preservation ==
A print of Wandering Fires is held by the George Eastman Museum.
