= Percy Heath (screenwriter) =

American screenwriter and dramatist (1884–1933)

- Born: January 30, 1884; Perry, Missouri, USA
- Died: February 9, 1933 (aged 49); Hollywood, California, USA
- Occupation: Screenwriter
- Years active: 1919–1933

Percy Heath (January 30, 1884 – February 9, 1933) was an American screenwriter and playwright.

He was nominated at the 5th Academy Awards in the category of Best Adapted Screenplay for his work on the 1931 version of Dr. Jekyll and Mr. Hyde. His nomination was shared with Samuel Hoffenstein.

During his career, Heath contributed to 50 films.

== Partial filmography ==
- Lasca (1919)
- Burnt Wings (1920)
- The Chorus Girl's Romance (1920)
- The March Hare (1921)
- One Wild Week (1921)
- Her Face Value (1921)
- The Love Charm (1921)
- First Love (1921)
- Her Gilded Cage (1922)
- The Impossible Mrs. Bellew (1922)
- Too Much Wife (1922)
- The Truthful Liar (1922)
- The Huntress (1923)
- Girls Men Forget (1924)
- Don't Tell Dad (1925)
- Good Morning, Madam! (1925)
- He Who Gets Smacked (1925)
- Let's Go, Gallagher (1925)
- A Roaring Adventure (1925)
- The Wyoming Wildcat (1925)
- The Dice Woman (1926)
- Forbidden Waters (1926)
- Fashions for Women (1927)
- Rolled Stockings (1927)
- The Sonora Kid (1927)
- Tell It to Sweeney (1927)
- Two Flaming Youths (1927)
- Half a Bride (1928)
- Red Hair (1928)
- Three Weekends (1928)
- Close Harmony (1929)
- The Man I Love (1929)
- The Border Legion (1930)
- Let's Go Native (1930)
- Only Saps Work (1930)
- Playboy of Paris (1930)
- Safety in Numbers (1930)
- Slightly Scarlet (1930)
- Dr. Jekyll and Mr. Hyde (1931)
- Dude Ranch (1931)
- The Gang Buster (1931)
- The Stolen Jools (1931)
- No One Man (1932)
- From Hell to Heaven (1933)
