= Elmer Blaney Harris =

American dramatist (1878–1966)

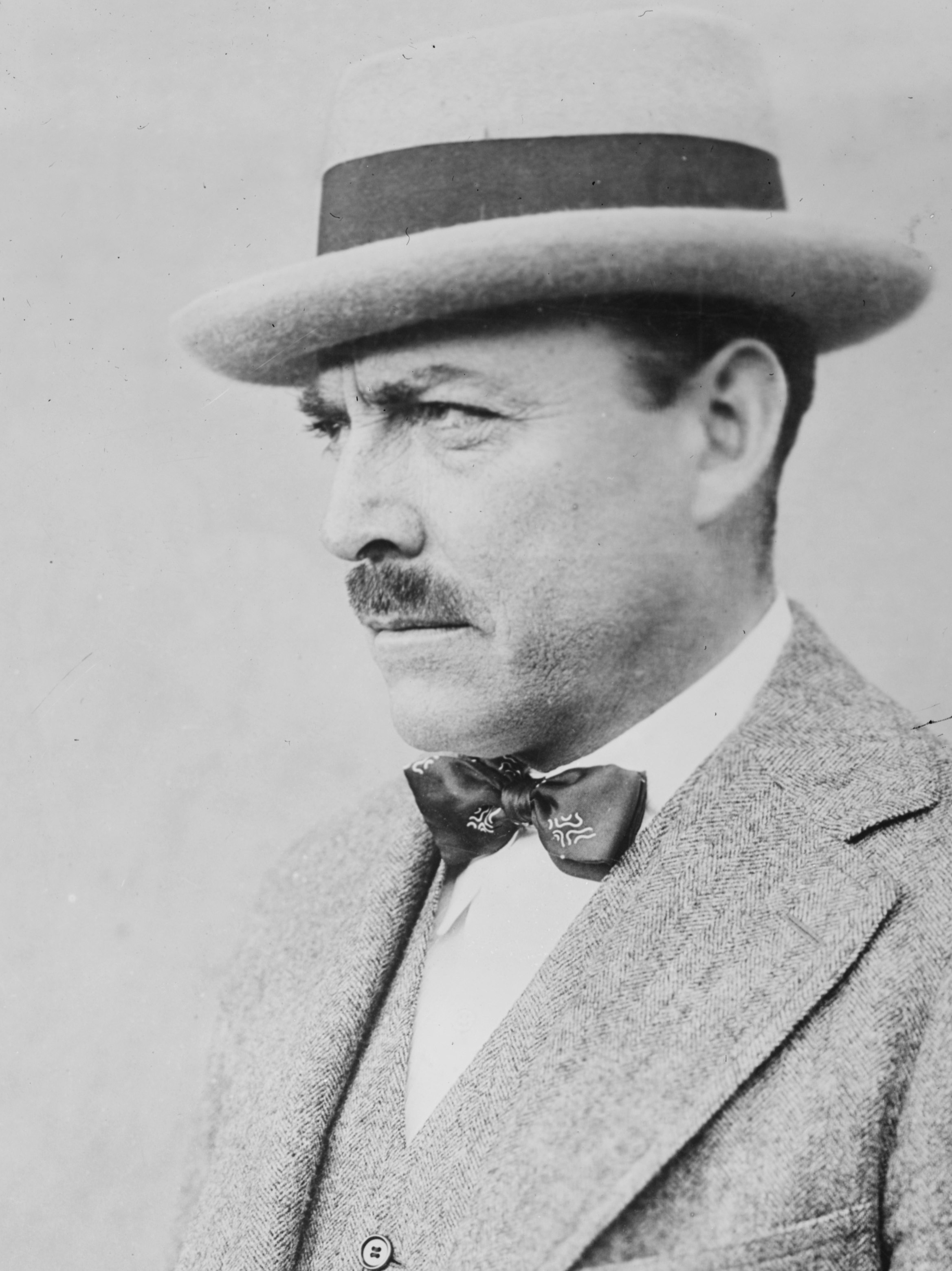
- Born: January 11, 1878; Chicago, Illinois
- Died: September 6, 1966 (aged 88); Washington, D.C.
- Occupation: Author - Dramatist - Playwright

Elmer Blaney Harris (January 11, 1878 – September 6, 1966) was an American author, dramatist, and playwright.

== Biography ==
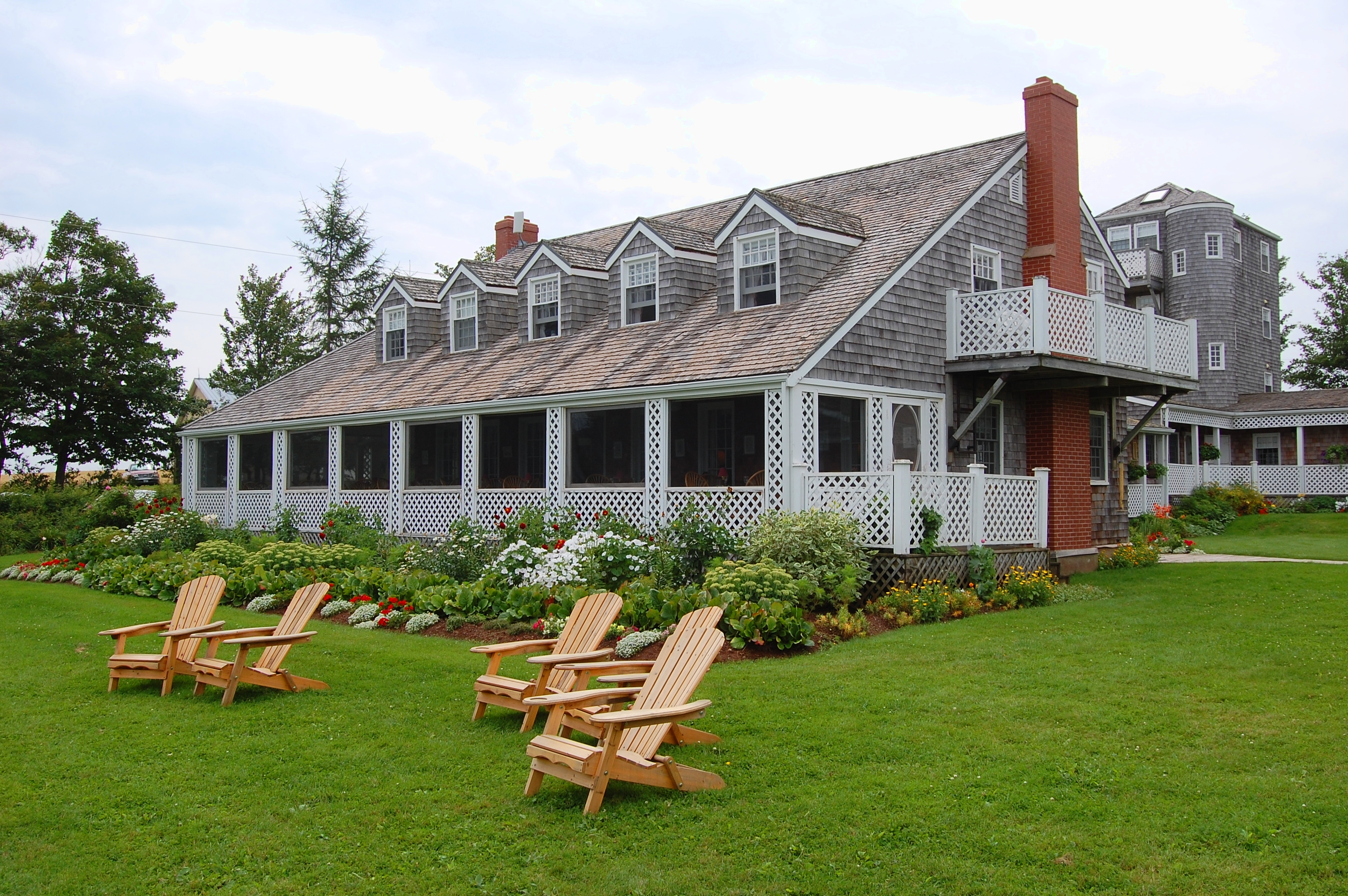
Harris's summer home in Prince Edward Island.

Harris was born in Chicago, Illinois as the youngest of eight children. He moved with his family to Oakland, California, after his father's broom factory burned to the ground. After high school, he attended the University of California, Berkeley. He graduated in 1901 with a B.S. in writing, and as an actor for the university theater troupe, he had gained a patron, Phoebe Apperson Hearst, the mother of William Randolph Hearst. With her financial backing, Harris was able to study in New York City and Europe for the next four years.

When he returned to San Francisco, he became a newspaper reporter for the San Francisco Call-Bulletin, and lectured at clubs and universities on authors and playwrights, such as George Bernard Shaw and Henrik Ibsen. However, this didn't last long: when the San Francisco earthquake of 1906 destroyed the newspaper's office and the newspaper, Harris left for New York City. There he wrote feverishly for newspapers and magazines, contributing articles, reviews, and short stories. At the same time he was translating with Cora Older. He began to travel back and forth from Manhattan to the Bay Area, and in California he helped to found the Carmel-by-the-Sea artists' colony. At Carmel he dramatized his first play, Sham, a short story by Geraldine Bonner.

Harris was married in 1908, and after his honeymoon he built a summer home in Fortune Bridge, Prince Edward Island, helping to establish a second artists' colony there. At Fortune Bridge he worked on his next three plays, The Offenders (1908), Trial Marriage (1909), and Thy Neighbor's Wife (1911). During this period, he divided his time between Fortune Bridge and New York City.

When World War I broke out, he was 39, and so was ineligible for combat. He went to work for the Food Board under Herbert Hoover, but tired of working with Graham flour, he took a new position as civil aide to the commander in charge of amusements and morale at Camp Bowie, Texas, as a dramatic director with the Fosdick Commission. He was also stationed in San Diego.

After the war he wrote his first screenplay, Lottery Man, in 1919. For the next twenty years he would be very prolific, collaborating on, directing, adapting, or supervising the production of almost 35 silent and "sound" films. He would live half the time in New York City, writing for the stage, and half in Hollywood, writing for the motion picture industry. In the 1920s, he wrote six screenplays that were produced by Peninsula Studios, including Chalk Marks (1924), The Girl on the Stairs (1924), The Wise Virgin (1924), The Awful Truth (1925), Beauty and The Badman (1925), and Let Women Alone (1925). He was also working on seven original screenplays of his own. He saw the major transitions in the motion picture industry occur, both the move from New York to Hollywood, and the progression from silent films to "talkies".

His best known film was probably Johnny Belinda, released in 1948. He would base the story on the residents of the local area of his summer home in Fortune Bridge, and actual events that occurred there. The title character was based on Lydia Dingwell (1852–1931) of Dingwells Mills, Prince Edward Island.

Elmer Blaney Harris died at age 88 in Washington, D.C.

== Partial filmography ==
- Pretty Mrs. Smith (1915)
- Help Wanted (1915)
- The Wild Olive (1915)
- Why Smith Left Home (1919)
- It Pays to Advertise (1919)
- An Adventure in Hearts (1919)
- Jack Straw (1920)
- Mrs. Temple's Telegram (1920)
- The Sins of St. Anthony (1920)
- What Happened to Jones (1920)
- So Long Letty (1920)
- Miss Hobbs (1920)
- The Education of Elizabeth (1921)
- Ducks and Drakes (1921)
- All Soul's Eve (1921)
- Sham (1921)
- The March Hare (1921)
- The Speed Girl (1921)
- Her Own Money (1922)
- Her Gilded Cage (1922)
- Tess of the Storm Country (1922)
- Garrison's Finish (1923)
- No More Women (1924)
- The Girl on the Stairs (1925)
- Eve's Leaves (1926)
- Sunny Side Up (1926)
- That Certain Thing (1928)
- So This Is Love? (1928)
- The Matinee Idol (1928)
- Ransom (1928)
- A Woman's Way (1928)
- Court Martial (1928)
- The Spirit of Youth (1929)
- So Long Letty (1929)
- Stepping Out (1931)
- Young Sinners (1931)
- Skyscraper Souls (1932)
- The Barbarian (1933)
- Cross Country Cruise (1934)
- Looking for Trouble (1934)
- Red Salute (1935)
- The Three Wise Guys (1936)
- Johnny Belinda (1948)
