= Maurice S. Campbell =

American journalist, Broadway producer

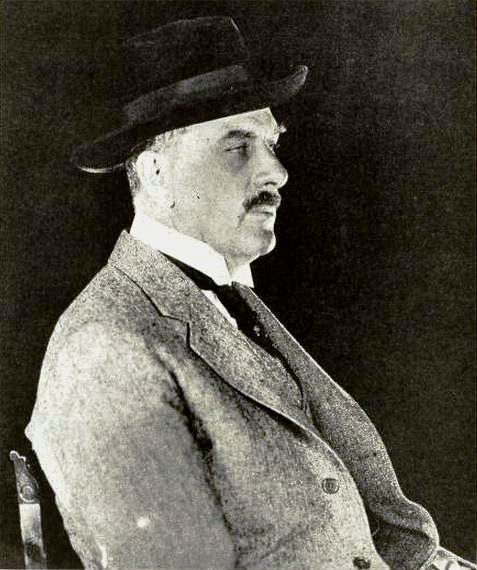
From a 1921 magazine

Maurice S. Campbell (October 7, 1869 or 1870 in Philadelphia, Pennsylvania – October 16, 1942) was an American journalist, Broadway producer, Army officer, silent film director, and enforcer of Prohibition in a long and varied career.

== Early life ==
Campbell was born the fifth child of Samuel Campbell (1829–1920), a candymaker, and his wife Mary. Shortly after his birth the family moved to Leadville, Colorado where Samuel made money in the mining boom there. After the death of Campbell's mother, his father remarried, to Caroline Brooke (1840–1905) of Lower Pottsgrove Township, Pennsylvania, and the family lived, first in Philadelphia and by 1883 on the Brooke farm. His father eventually had a 30-room mansion built on the property.

Campbell graduated from New York University in 1889 with a degree in veterinary medicine. Instead of establishing a practice, Campbell went into journalism, working for the New York Herald, covering the Spanish–American War, and later becoming the assistant city desk editor.

== Show business ==
In 1896 Campbell married actress Henrietta Crosman and moved into the world of show business. He became a press agent and then a writer, producer, and director. Between 1902 and 1913 he produced many Broadway plays, most of them featuring his wife, including the only Broadway production of Henrik Ibsen's When We Dead Awaken in 1905 and Where There's a Will (1910), which Campbell himself adopted from a French comedy by Paul Gavault and Robert Charvay; it ran 64 performances and was briefly revived in 1939.

Campbell served in the US Army 4th Division during World War I, reaching the rank of major; he probably served as a veterinarian.

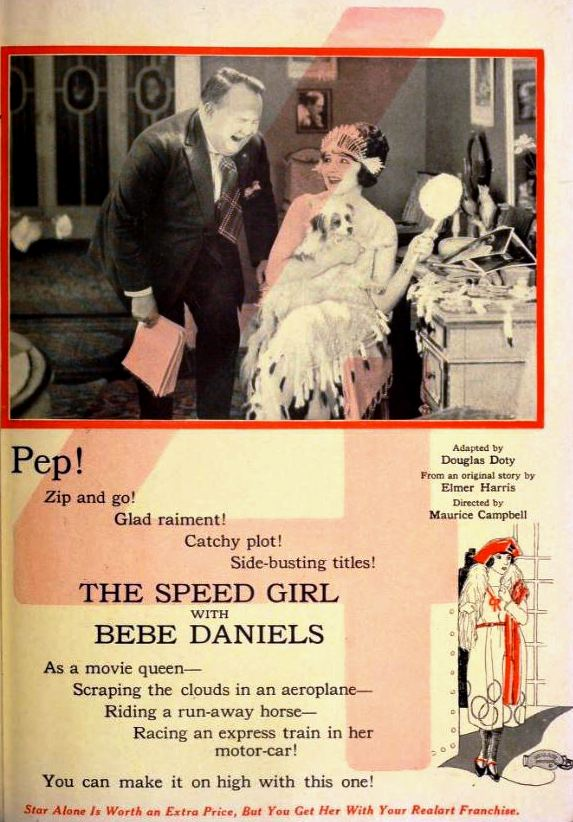
Campbell's "The Speed Girl" (1921), starring Bebe Daniels

After the war Campbell became a director in the new silent film industry. Most of his work was done for Realart Pictures, a production unit associated with Adolph Zukor's Famous Players–Lasky studios and distributed by Paramount Pictures. His output included at least 14 films between 1920 and 1925, including Oh, Lady, Lady (1920), starring Bebe Daniels in a version of a popular play by P. G. Wodehouse, An Amateur Devil (1920), Burglar Proof (1920), She Couldn't Help It (1920), First Love (1921), The Speed Girl (1921), Two Weeks with Pay (1921), The March Hare (1921), Ducks and Drakes (1921), One Wild Week (1921), Through a Glass Window (1922), Midnight (1922), The Exciters (1923), and Wandering Fires (1925). Most of his films have been lost.

While in Hollywood Campbell, on behalf of the Motion Picture Directors Association, managed an elaborate gala production of Shakespeare's A Midsummer Night's Dream in the Hollywood Bowl on October 7, 1922 as a benefit for the Actors Fund of America. The production included the Los Angeles Philharmonic Orchestra under director Frederic Richard Sullivan.

== Prohibition ==
In 1926 Campbell, who was an active supporter of Prohibition, became Supervisor of the Great Lakes and North Atlantic Zones for the Bureau of Prohibition, the federal agency charged with enforcing that law. In June 1927 he was appointed the administrator for Prohibition District 2 of the state of New York, a district which included New York City – a center of opposition to Prohibition.

Campbell's enthusiastic enforcement efforts, including a massive series of nightclub raids in New York City while New York state's "wet" governor, Al Smith, was being nominated at the Democratic national convention, were politically embarrassing to Republican party leaders. In July 1930 he was reassigned to upstate New York and resigned in protest. By then Campbell had concluded that enforcement was impossible and a cause of corruption and crime.

Campbell accused Assistant Treasury Secretary Seymour Lowman and others of asking him to reduce Prohibition enforcement in New York City for political reasons, publishing a series of articles in the New York World about the matter and later complaining directly to President Hoover about Lowman's conduct. In 1931 Campbell became the editor of a new anti-Prohibition publication, "Repeal".

== Personal life ==
Campbell and Crosman had a son, Maurice Jr., in 1897. They moved to Pelham Manor, New York in 1913 and lived there the rest of their lives, except for Campbell's war service and his time in Hollywood in the early 1920s.
