= Burglar Proof =

1920 film by Maurice Campbell

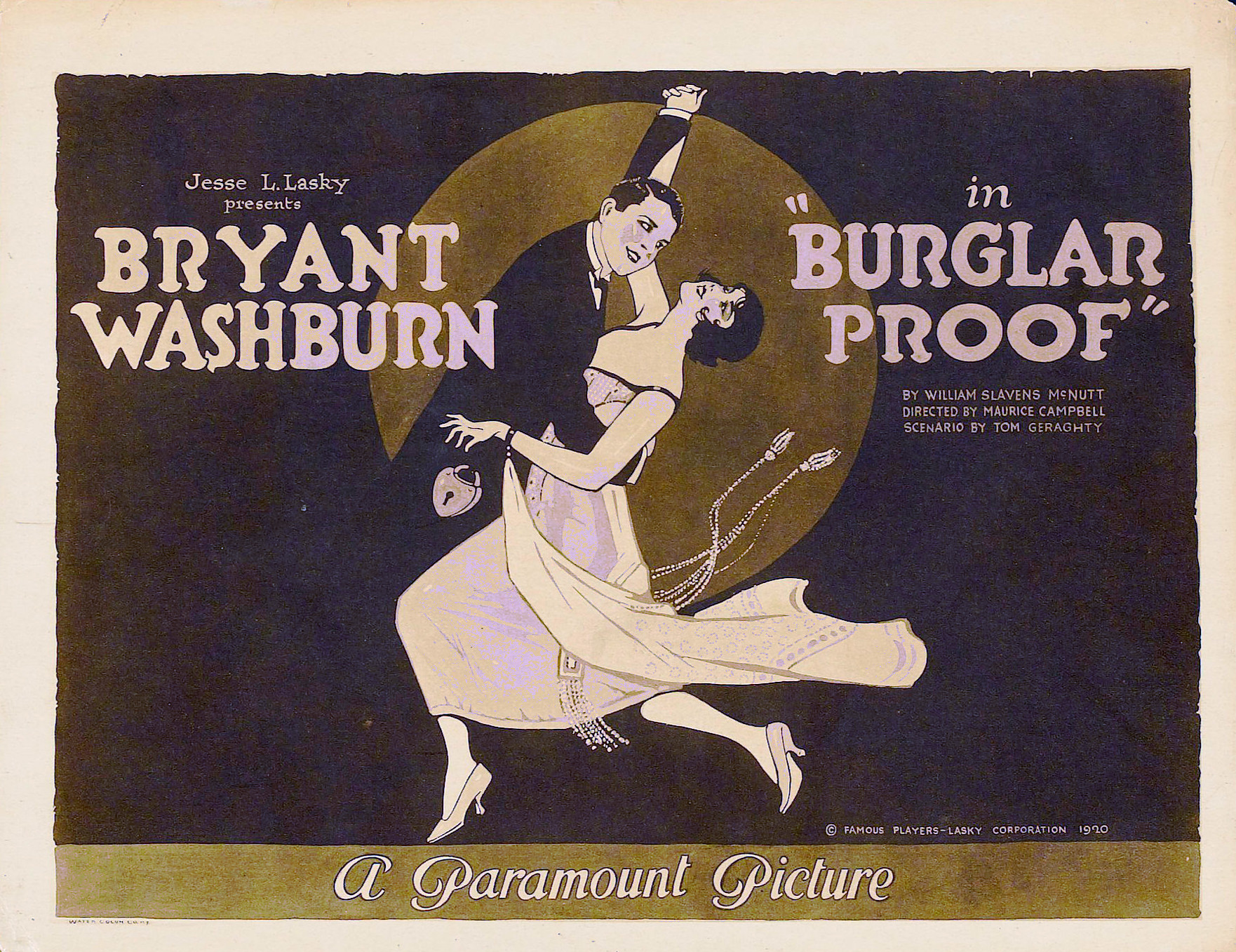
- Lobby card
- Directed by: Maurice Campbell
- Screenplay by: Thomas J. Geraghty
- Produced by: Jesse L. Lasky
- Starring: Bryant Washburn; Lois Wilson; Grace Morse; Emily Chichester; Clarence Geldart; Clarence Burton
- Cinematography: Charles Edgar Schoenbaum
- Production company: Famous Players–Lasky Corporation
- Distributed by: Paramount Pictures
- Release date: November 21, 1920
- Running time: 50 minutes
- Country: United States
- Language: Silent (English intertitles)

Burglar Proof is a 1920 American silent comedy film directed by Maurice Campbell and written by Thomas J. Geraghty. The film stars Bryant Washburn, Lois Wilson, Grace Morse, Emily Chichester, Clarence Geldart, and Clarence Burton. The film was released on November 21, 1920, by Paramount Pictures. It is not known whether the film currently survives.

== Cast ==
- Bryant Washburn as John Harlow
- Lois Wilson as Laura Lowell
- Grace Morse as Jenny Larkin
- Emily Chichester as Clara
- Clarence Geldart as Richard Crane
- Clarence Burton as Martin Green
- Tom Bates as Uncle Jim Harlow
- Hayward Mack as George
- Blanche Gray as Mrs. Lowell
