= The Soul of France =

1928 film

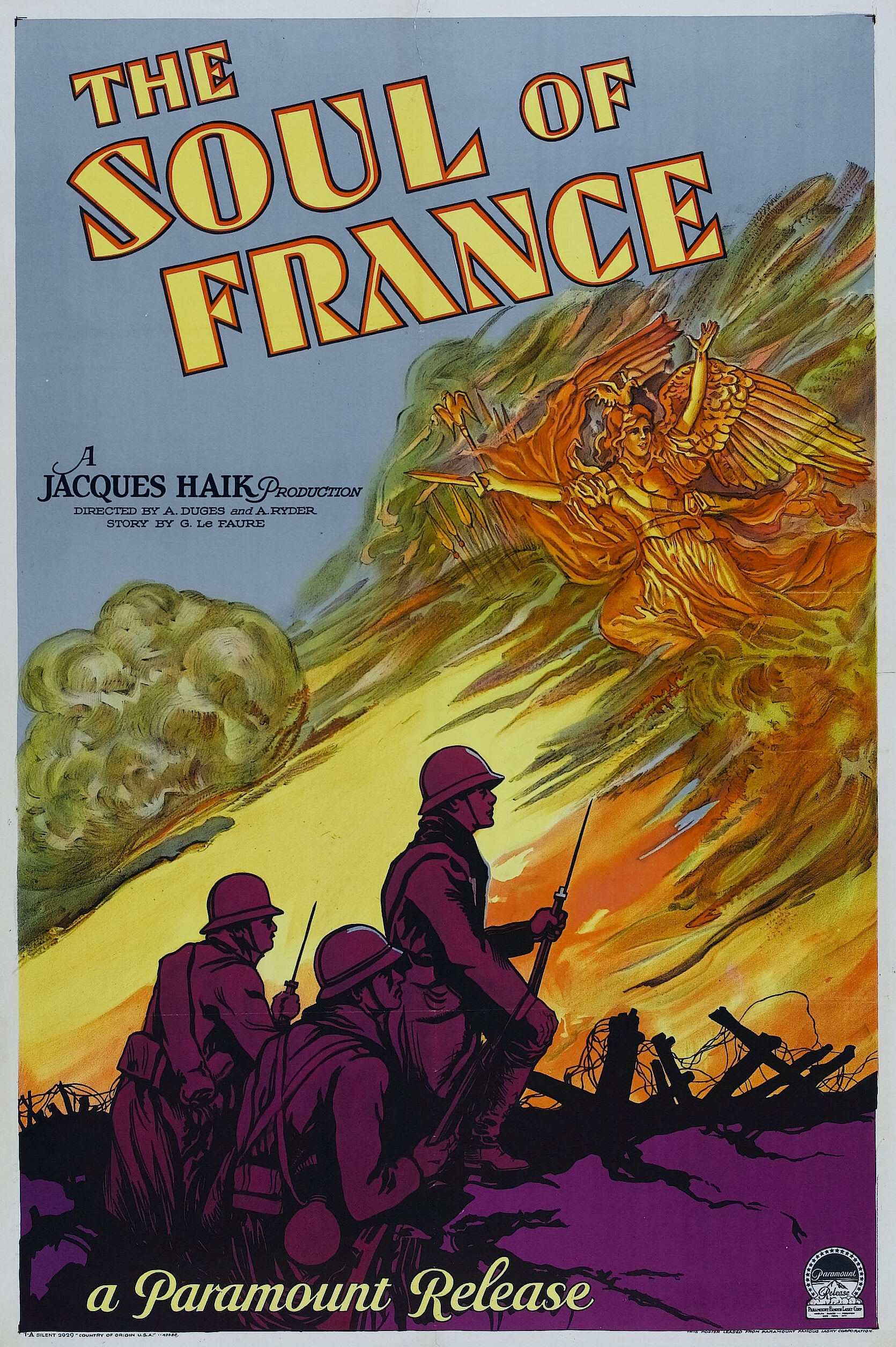
- Poster for the film "The Soul Of France
- Directed by: André Dugès; Alexandre Ryder
- Written by: Georges Le Faurey
- Produced by: Jacques Haik
- Starring: Georges Charlia; Michèle Verly; Jean Murat
- Cinematography: René Gaveau; Paul Portier
- Production company: Paramount Pictures
- Distributed by: Paramount Pictures
- Release date: 19 July 1928
- Running time: 97 minutes
- Country: France
- Languages: Sound (Synchronized); English Intertitles

The Soul of France (La Grande Épreuve) is a French synchronized sound black and white sound film, directed by André Dugès and Alexandre Ryder, with a screenplay by Georges Le Faure. The film was released and distributed by Paramount Pictures in 1928. The film has no audible dialogue but featured a synchronized musical score and sound effects. The soundtrack was recorded by Paramount Pictures using the Western Electric Sound System sound-on-film process. The soundtrack was also transferred to discs for those theatres that were wired with sound-on-disc sound systems.

The film is an adaptation of the eponymous novel by Georges Le Faure, which won the Marcelin-Guérin Prize in 1929. The film starred Georges Charlia, Michele Verly, Jean Murat and Berthe Jalabert.

== Plot ==
The film follows the story of Jean (Georges Charlia), a young French soldier returning home after World War I. He is physically and mentally scarred by the horrors he witnessed on the front lines. He struggles to readjust to civilian life, haunted by nightmares and flashbacks.

His family welcomes him with open arms, but they soon realize the extent of his trauma. He meets Madeleine (Michèle Verly), his childhood sweetheart. Their joyful reunion is short-lived as Jean discovers Madeleine is now married to his friend and fellow soldier, Pierre (Jean Murat).

Devastated and harboring feelings of betrayal, Jean struggles to reintegrate into civilian life. He finds solace in the company of Marie-Louise (Simone Debout), a kind and supportive woman who offers him emotional refuge. However, the shadow of his lost love continues to haunt him, especially when he learns Pierre and Madeleine's marriage is strained by Pierre's war trauma.

As Jean grapples with his inner demons, he becomes increasingly withdrawn and isolated. He finds solace in alcohol, which only deepens his depression and fuels his destructive tendencies. His family fears he will succumb to his despair, and they desperately search for ways to help him find peace.

Through flashbacks, the film reveals the events that shaped Jean's wartime experiences. We see the camaraderie and brotherhood he shared with his fellow soldiers, the terrifying battles they fought, and the devastating losses they endured. These flashbacks paint a vivid picture of the psychological toll of war and its lasting impact on the human spirit.

The film's climax arrives when Jean faces a life-threatening situation. This event forces him to confront his fears and rediscover his inner strength. He finds solace in the love and support of his family and friends, and with their help, he begins the long journey towards healing and recovery.

As Jean works through his pain and tries to move on, Madeleine seeks his advice and seeks solace in their shared past. This rekindles old feelings for both, adding complexity to their already delicate situation. Torn between loyalty to his friend and his enduring love for Madeleine, Jean is caught in a difficult emotional triangle. The film was released and distributed by Paramount Pictures in 1928.

== Cast ==
- Georges Charlia
- Michèle Verly
- Jean Murat
- Berthe Jalabert
- Maxime Desjardins
- Jeanne Kerwich

== Production ==
The directors filmed actual reconstructions of the main battles of September 1914 in the Marne river.

== Reception ==
The film was a critical and commercial success upon its release in 1928. The film was praised for its emotional depth and performances by the lead actors. The film's performances, particularly by Georges Charlia and Jean Murat, were also highly lauded. The film remains a significant film in French cinema history, offering a powerful and moving portrayal of the human experience during World War I.

== See also ==
- List of early sound feature films (1926–1929)

== Bibliography ==
- Crafton, D. (1999). The Talkies: American Cinema's Transition to Sound, 1926–1931. United Kingdom: University of California Press.
- Eames JD. The Paramount Story : The Complete History of the Studio and Its 2,805 Films. London: Octopus; 1985.
- Eyman, Scott (1997). The Speed of Sound: Hollywood and the Talkie Revolution 1926–1930. New York: Simon and Schuster. ISBN 978-1-4391-0428-6.
