= The Exciters (film) =

1923 film

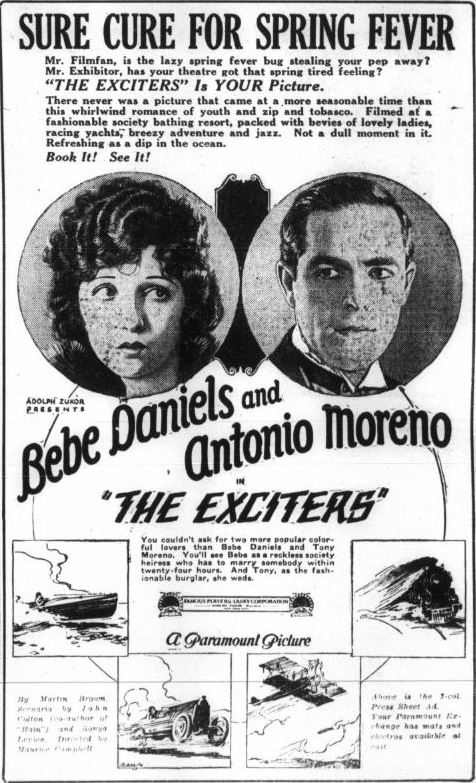
- Advertisement
- Directed by: Maurice Campbell
- Written by: Sonya Levien (scenario); John Colton (scenario)
- Based on: The Exciters by Martin Brown
- Produced by: Adolph Zukor; Jesse L. Lasky
- Starring: Bebe Daniels
- Cinematography: George Webber
- Distributed by: Paramount Pictures
- Release date: June 3, 1923
- Running time: 6 reels
- Country: United States
- Language: Silent (English intertitles)

The Exciters is a 1923 American silent romantic comedy film produced by Famous Players–Lasky and distributed through Paramount Pictures. It is based on a 1922 Broadway play of the same name by Martin Brown. This film was directed by Maurice Campbell and stars Bebe Daniels, then a popular Paramount contract star. On the Broadway stage, Bebe Daniels's role of Ronnie Rand was played by Tallulah Bankhead.

== Plot ==
As described in a film magazine review, Ronnie Rand, a young woman who loves excitement of all kinds and whose watchword is speed, is obliged to marry by a certain day or lose a rich inheritance. Through dramatic circumstances, she meets Pierre Martel, a member of a band of crooks. Thinking that he is a man's man, Ronnie marries him. Martel's confederates seek to blackmail Ronnie and when she refuses to sign a check, they attempt to kill Martel, but he is saved by the police. It then develops that Martel is no crook at all, but is a United States Secret Service agent who was obtaining evidence against the crooks. Ronnie, somewhat disappointed that her husband is no burglar, makes the best of it and both husband and wife are happy.

== Cast ==
- Bebe Daniels as Ronnie Rand
- Antonio Moreno as Pierre Martel
- Burr McIntosh as Rackam, The Lawyer
- Diana Allen as Ermintrude
- Cyril Ring as Roger Patton
- Bigelow Cooper as Hilary Rand
- Ida Darling as Mrs. Rand
- Jane Thomas as Della Vaughn
- Allan Simpson as The Mechanician
- George Backus as The Minister
- Henry Sedley as Gentleman Eddie
- Erville Alderson as Chloroform Charlie
- Tom Blake as Flash

== Preservation ==
With no prints of The Exciters located in any film archives, it is a lost film.
