= The Education of Elizabeth =

1921 film

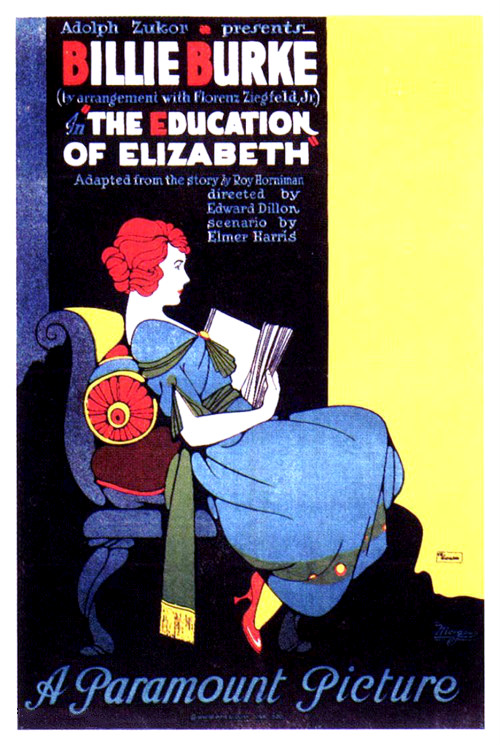
- Film poster
- Directed by: Edward Dillon
- Written by: Elmer Harris
- Based on: The Education of Elizabeth by Roy Horniman
- Produced by: Adolph Zukor; Jesse Lasky
- Starring: Billie Burke
- Cinematography: George J. Folsey
- Distributed by: Paramount Pictures
- Release date: January 16, 1921
- Running time: 5 reels, 4,705 feet
- Country: United States
- Language: Silent (English intertitles)

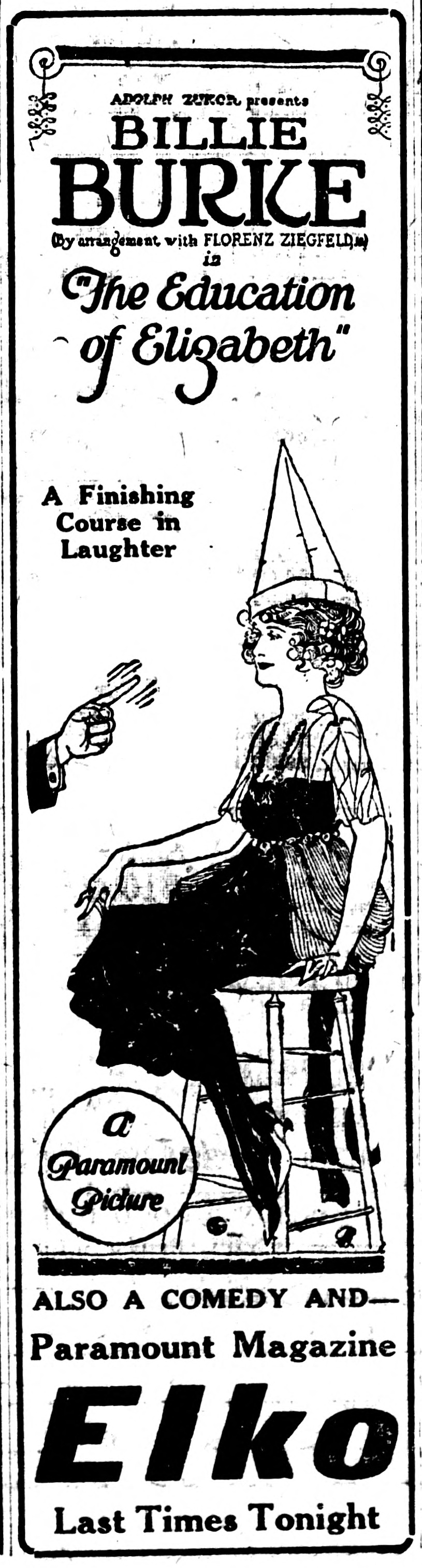
Newspaper advertisement.

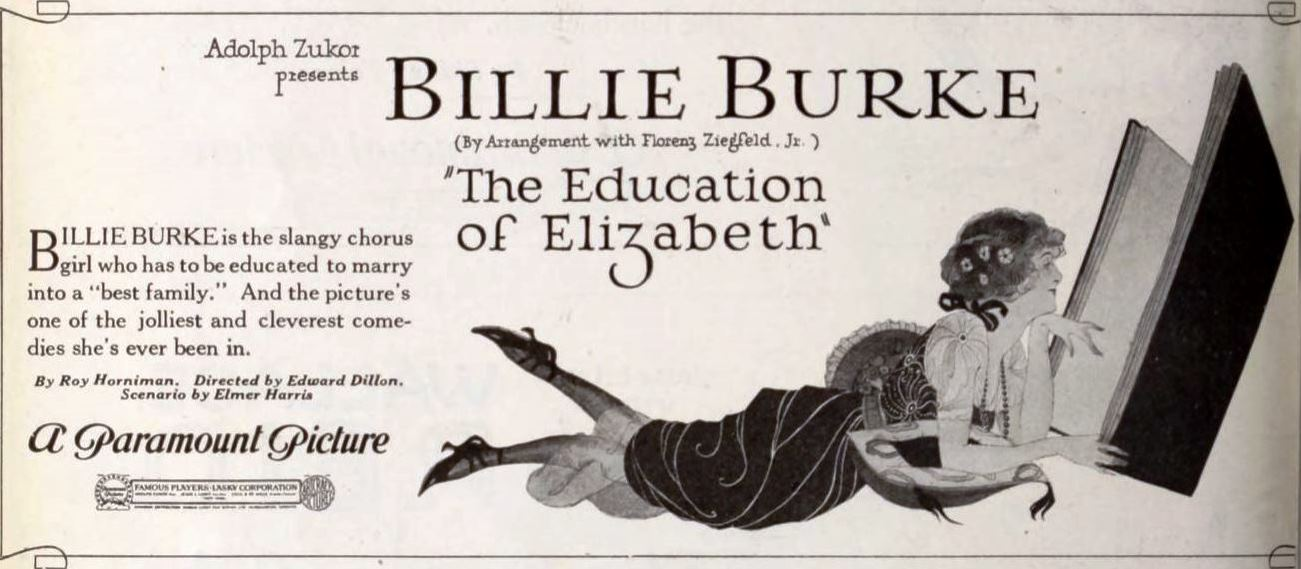
Theater card keepsake.

The Education of Elizabeth is a 1921 American silent comedy romance film produced by Famous Players–Lasky and distributed by Paramount Pictures. It was directed by Edward Dillon and stars stage star Billie Burke in her last silent film. The film was based on a play by Roy Horniman and is now a lost film.

== Cast ==
- Billie Burke as Elizabeth Banks
- Lumsden Hare as Thomas
- Edith Sharpe as Lucy Fairfax
- Donald Cameron as Harry
- Frederick Burton as Middleton
- Fredric March (uncredited extra)
