= Sham (1921 film) =

1921 film

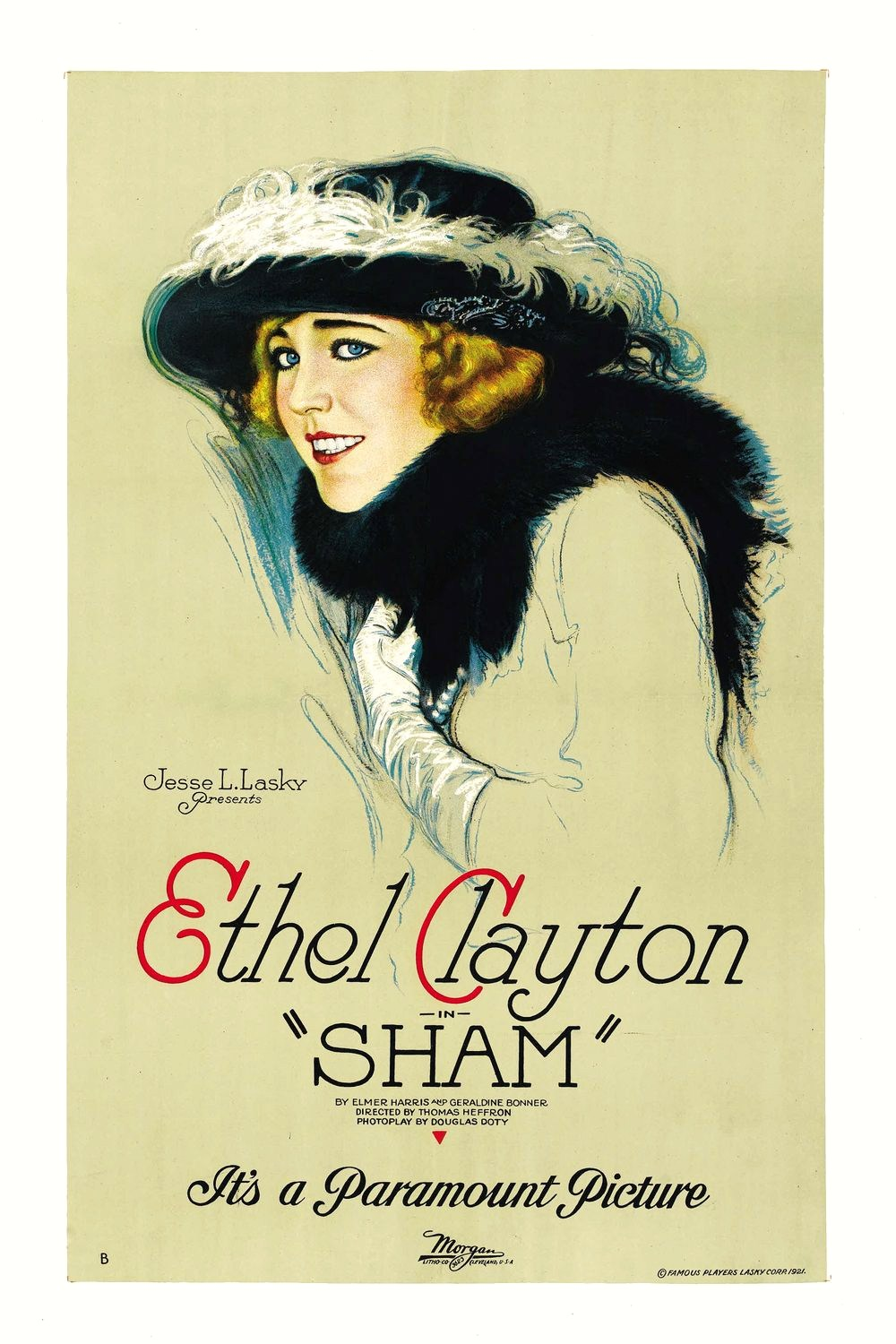
- Poster
- Directed by: Thomas N. Heffron
- Written by: Douglas Z. Doty (adaptation)
- Based on: Sham by Elmer Harris and Geraldine Bonner
- Produced by: Jesse Lasky
- Starring: Ethel Clayton; Theodore Roberts; Sylvia Ashton
- Cinematography: C. Edgar Schoenbaum
- Production company: Famous Players–Lasky
- Distributed by: Paramount Pictures
- Release date: May 5, 1921
- Running time: 50 mins.
- Country: United States
- Language: Silent (English intertitles)

Sham is a lost 1921 American silent romantic drama directed by Thomas N. Heffron and starring Ethel Clayton and Theodore Roberts. The film is based on the 1905 play of the same name written by Elmer Harris and Geraldine Bonner, and was adapted for the screen by Douglas Z. Doty.

== Plot ==
Based upon a description in a film publication, Katherine Van Riper is an extravagant young society girl who is very much in debt, and her wealthy aunts and uncle refuse to give her any money. Katherine is desperate enough that she is considering marrying the wealthy Montee Buck, although she is in love with the westerner Tom Jaffrey, who says he is poor. Finally, Katherine decides to sell the famous Van Riper pearls, pay off her debts, and marry Tom. However, upon examination the jewelry turns out to be paste, with her father having sold the genuine pearls several years earlier before his death. Montee is assured by the aunts that Katherine will marry him and tells this to Tom. Tom is about to leave town when Uncle James steps in and pays off Katherine's debts, leaving the niece free to marry Tom.

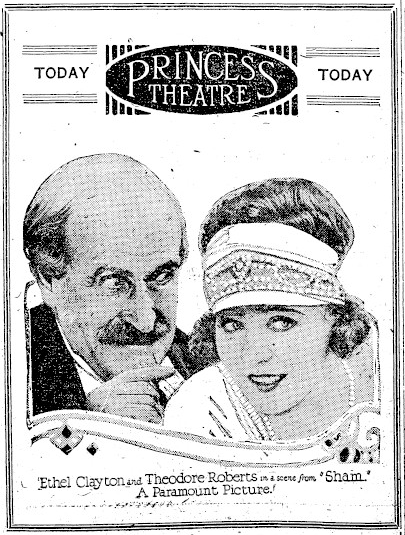
Stars Ethel Clayton and Theodore Roberts featured in a promotional ad for the film.

== Cast ==
- Ethel Clayton as Katherine Van Riper
- Clyde Fillmore as Tom Jaffrey
- Theodore Roberts as Jeriamiah Buck
- Sylvia Ashton as Aunt Bella
- Walter Hiers as Montee Buck
- Helen Dunbar as Aunt Louisa
- Arthur Edmund Carewe as Bolton
- Tom Ricketts as Uncle James
- Blanche Gray as Clementine Vickers
- Eunice Burnham as Maud Buck
- Carrie Clark Ward as Rosie
