= The March Hare (1921 film) =

1921 film

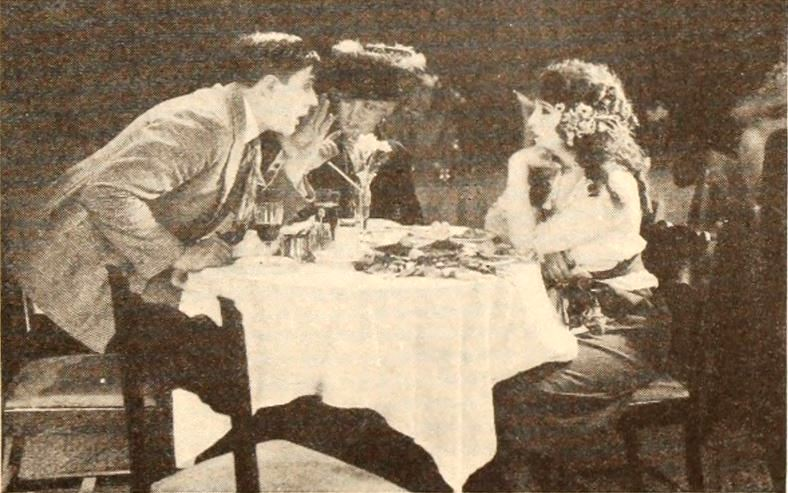
- Still from film
- Directed by: Maurice Campbell
- Written by: Elmer Harris (story); Percy Heath
- Starring: Bebe Daniels
- Cinematography: H. Kinley Martin
- Production company: Realart Pictures Corporation
- Distributed by: Realart Pictures Corporation
- Release date: June 1921 (USA)
- Running time: 50 minutes
- Country: United States
- Language: Silent (English intertitles)

The March Hare is a lost 1921 American silent comedy romance film produced and distributed by Adolph Zukor's Realart Pictures Corporation. It stars Bebe Daniels.

== Cast ==
- Bebe Daniels as Lizbeth Ann Palmer
- Grace Morse as Clara Belle Palmer
- Herbert Sherwood as Lucius Palmer
- Helen Jerome Eddy as Susie
- Sidney Bracey as Meadows
- Frances Raymond as Mrs. Rollins
- Melbourne MacDowell as Senator Rollins
- Harry Myers as Tod Rollins
