= Through a Glass Window =

1922 film by Maurice Campbell

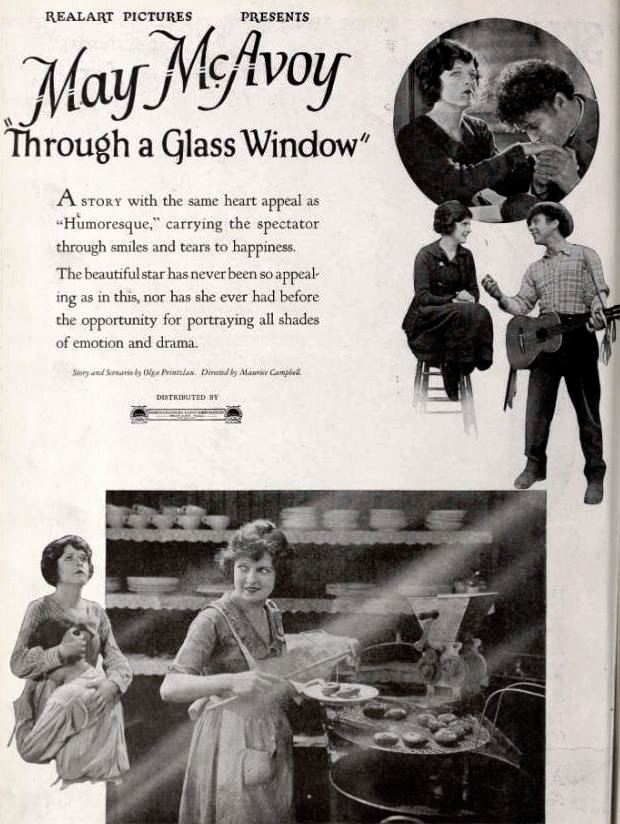
- Advertisement
- Directed by: Maurice Campbell
- Screenplay by: Olga Printzlau
- Starring: May McAvoy; Fanny Midgley; Burwell Hamrick; Raymond McKee; F. A. Turner; Carrie Clark Ward
- Cinematography: Harold Rosson
- Production company: Realart Pictures Corporation
- Distributed by: Paramount Pictures
- Release date: April 2, 1922
- Running time: 50 minutes
- Country: United States
- Language: Silent (English intertitles)

Through a Glass Window is a lost 1922 American drama silent film directed by Maurice Campbell, written by Olga Printzlau, and starring May McAvoy, Fanny Midgley, Burwell Hamrick, Raymond McKee, F. A. Turner, and Carrie Clark Ward. It was released on April 2, 1922, by Paramount Pictures.

== Plot ==
As described in a film magazine, Jenny Martin, daughter of an invalid mother, makes many friends as a waitress of a doughnut shop on New York City's Lower East Side. Her brother Dan is arrest for a theft committed to aid his sister and is sent to a reformatory. Jenny keeps the facts from her mother, who has gone blind. Jenny builds up an independent business for her brother to take over when he returns, and postpones until then her marriage to Italian vendor Tomasso Barilio. Her brother finally returns and the wedding is in prospect as the film ends.

== Cast ==
- May McAvoy as Jenny Martin
- Fanny Midgley as Mrs. Martin
- Burwell Hamrick as Dan Martin
- Raymond McKee as Tomasso Barilio
- F. A. Turner as Matt Clancy
- Carrie Clark Ward as Molly Clancy
- Frank Butterworth as Jimmy
- Wade Boteler as Hartigan
- Russ Powell as Coffee Pete

== Preservation ==
With no holdings located in archives, Through a Glass Window is considered a lost film.
