= The Speed Girl =

1921 film

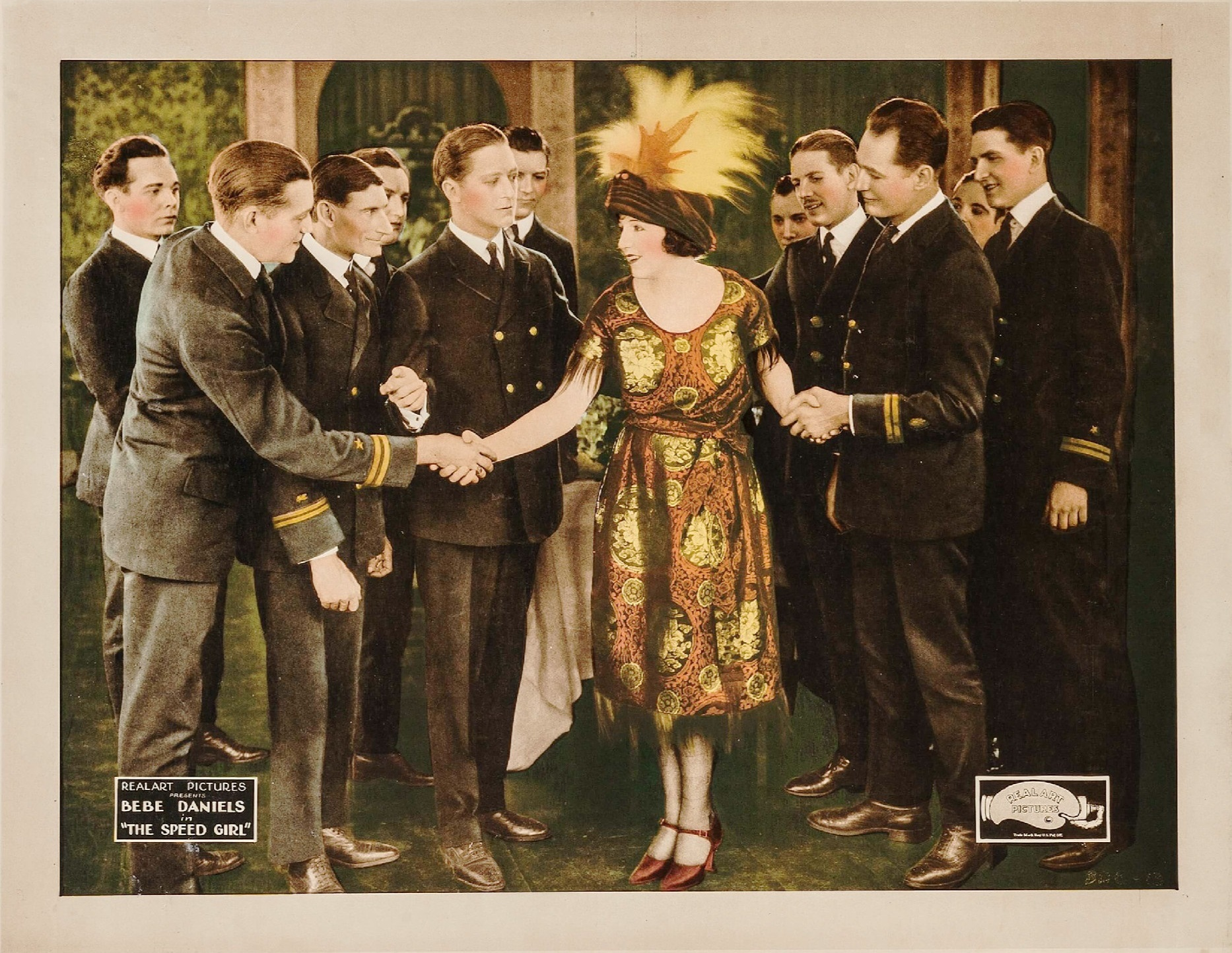
- Lobby card
- Directed by: Maurice Campbell
- Written by: Elmer Harris (story); Douglas Z. Doty (scenarios)
- Starring: Bebe Daniels
- Cinematography: H. Kinley Martin
- Production company: Realart Pictures Corporation
- Distributed by: Realart Pictures Corporation
- Release date: November 1921
- Running time: 64 minutes
- Country: United States
- Language: Silent (English intertitles)

The Speed Girl is a lost 1921 American silent comedy film produced and distributed by Realart Pictures through Paramount Pictures. It was directed by Maurice Campbell, a Broadway director and producer, and starred Bebe Daniels, then a popular 20-year-old veteran film actress.

The film was supposedly expanded into a screenplay from Bebe Daniels's real life jail sentence of 10 days for speeding.

== Plot ==
As described in a film magazine, screen star Betty Lee is in love with naval officer Tom Manley. Tom is due back on his ship at a certain hour and Betty, not realizing the importance of this, sets his watch back. When she is told that he will be court-martialed if he is not on deck on time, Betty endeavors to get him back in town. She is arrested for speeding and put in a jail cell. Hundreds of fans visit, and Judge Ketcham, who had sentenced her, brings a bouquet and apologizes. Betty befriends a fellow prisoner and is instrumental in helping her, too.

== Cast ==
- Bebe Daniels as Betty Lee
- Theodore von Eltz as Tom Manley
- Frank Elliott as Carl D'Arcy
- Walter Hiers as Soapy Taylor
- Norris Johnson as Hilda
- Truly Shattuck as Mrs. Lee
- William Courtright as Judge Ketcham
- Barbara Maier as Little Girl
