= Ducks and Drakes =

1921 film

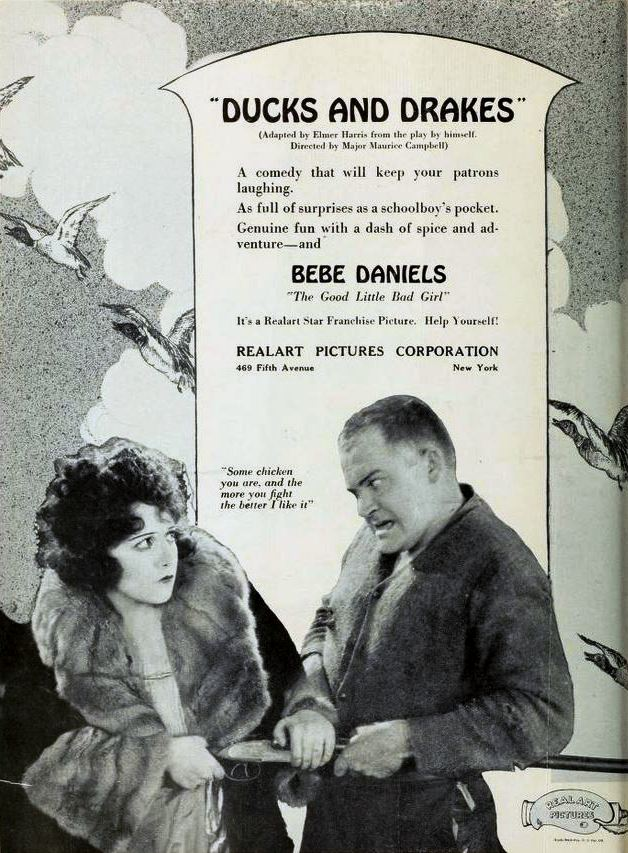
- Advertisement
- Directed by: Maurice Campbell
- Written by: Elmer Harris (screen story & scenario)
- Cinematography: H. Kinley Martin
- Production company: Realart Pictures Corporation
- Distributed by: Realart Pictures Corporation
- Release date: February 1921
- Running time: 5 reels (58 minutes)
- Country: United States
- Language: Silent (English intertitles)

Ducks and Drakes is a 1921 American silent comedy film produced and released by Realart Pictures, an offshoot of Paramount Pictures. It was directed by stage producer/director Maurice Campbell and stars Bebe Daniels (also a producer on this film) and Jack Holt. Elmer Harris provided the story and screenplay. A copy is held at the Library of Congress.

== Plot ==
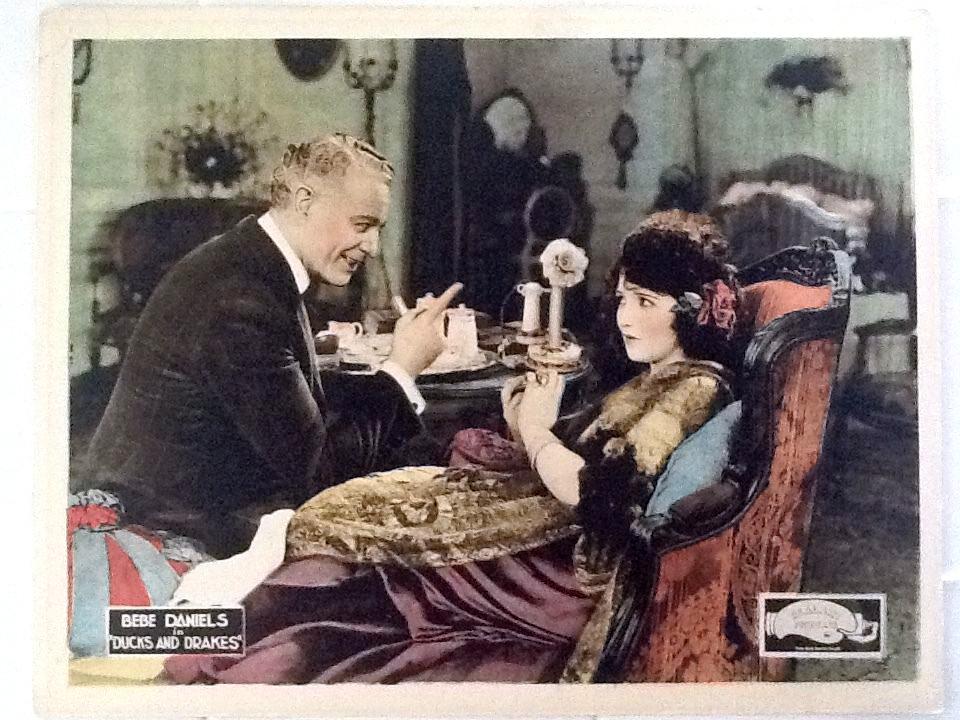
Lobby card showing Edward Martindel and Bebe Daniels.

Based upon a summary in a film publication, Teddy Simpson is a wealthy young orphan who, instead of marrying Rob Winslow, whom her Aunty Weeks has selected for her, is bent upon getting into trouble by seeking adventure and through her flirtatious ways. Rob's friends, victims of her telephone flirtations, offer to help him cure her. Part of the cure involves Teddy taking a ride with Tom Hazzard to an exclusive gun club, with the other conspirators making things so warm for her that she is cured for all time. When Rob calls her the next day, he finds her ready to consent to a speedy wedding.

== Cast ==
- Bebe Daniels as Teddy Simpson
- Jack Holt as Rob Winslow
- Mayme Kelso as Aunty Weeks
- Edward Martindel as Dick Chiltern
- W. E. Lawrence as Tom Hazzard
- Wade Boteler as Colonel Tweed
- Maurie Newell as Cissy
- Elsie Andrean as Mina

== Status ==
A DVD was released by Edward Lorusso with a music score by David Drazin in March 2016.
