= All Soul's Eve =

1921 film

All Souls' Eve
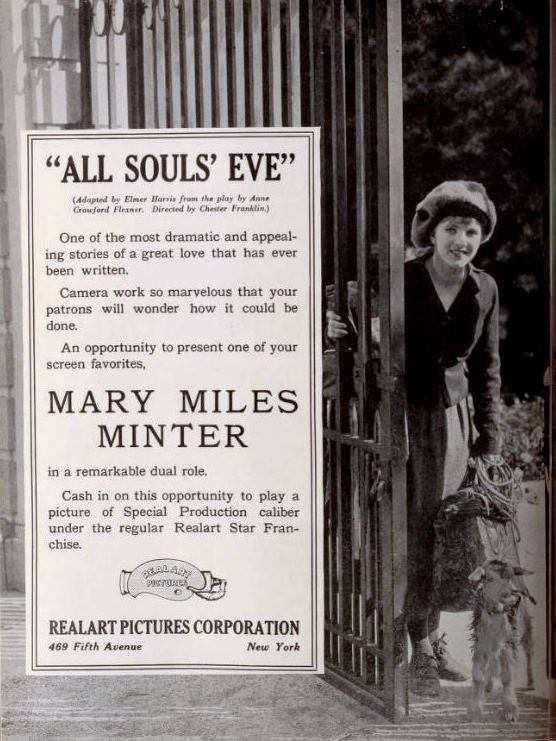
- Advertisement
- Directed by: Chester Franklin
- Written by: Elmer Harris
- Based on: All Soul's Eve (play) by Anne Crawford Flexner
- Starring: Mary Miles Minter; Jack Holt; Carmen Phillips; Clarence Geldart
- Cinematography: Faxon M. Dean
- Production company: Realart Pictures Corporation
- Distributed by: Realart Pictures Corporation
- Release date: February 20, 1921
- Running time: 6 reels
- Country: United States
- Language: Silent (English intertitles)

All Souls' Eve is a 1921 American silent drama film directed by Chester M. Franklin and starring Mary Miles Minter. The film is based on the mystical 1920 Broadway play of the same name by Anne Crawford Flexner, with a story by Elmer Blaney Harris. Much was made of the film's use of double, triple and quadruple exposures to enable Minter to play two parts within the same scenes.

== Plot ==
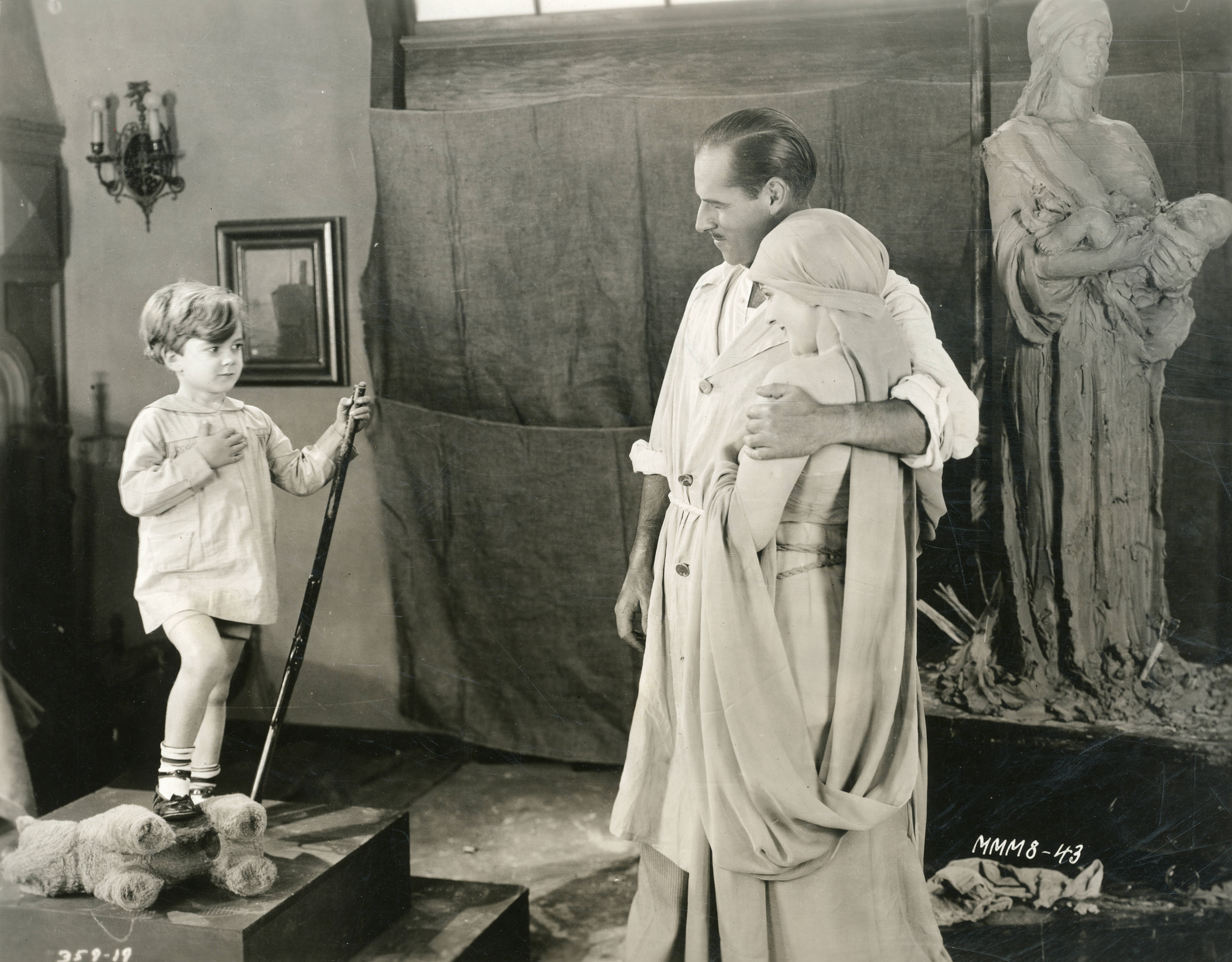
Mary Miles Minter in "All Soul's Eve (1921)

As described in various film magazine reviews, Nora O'Hallahan is a young girl living in Ireland, who firmly believes that, on All Souls' Eve, the spirits of the dead return to visit those whom they loved in life. Her mother is living in America, and Nora sails to join her. When she arrives, she finds that her mother has died, and she takes up a position as a nursemaid with the Heath family. Roger Heath is a sculptor, and he and his wife Alice have one young son, Peter.

Olivia Larkin is in love with Roger, and desperately jealous of Alice Heath. When she finds that she is unable to lure Roger away from his wife, she convinces Lawson, a madman living in the local woods, that Alice Heath is the one responsible for his misfortunes. Lawson murders Alice, and Roger, devastated by his wife's death, neglects his work and his son, turning to drink and Olivia for solace.

On All Souls' Eve, young Peter Heath falls seriously ill. Nora, who has been caring for him, tries to rouse Roger, but he is too drunk to respond. She sends for Dr. McAllister, but before he can arrive, the soul of Alice Heath descends from heaven and, unable to save her son herself, transfers her love for him into Nora, who saves Peter's life.

After this event, Roger finds that Nora becomes ever more like Alice in appearance and mannerisms. He asks her to pose for him so that he can complete his masterpiece of sculpture - a statue of Alice - and shuns Olivia and drink as he comes to realise that he loves Nora. Olivia is pursued to her death in a lake by the madman Lawson, and Nora becomes Roger's wife and mother to little Peter.

The February 12th, 1921 edition of Motion Picture News lists a musical cue sheet for the film.

== Cast ==
- Mary Miles Minter as Alice Heath / Nora O'Hallahan
- Jack Holt as Roger Heath
- Carmen Phillips as Olivia Larkin
- Clarence Geldart as Dr. Sandy McAllister
- Michael D. Moore as Peter Heath (credited as Mickey Moore)
- Fanny Midgley as Mrs. O'Hallahan
- Lottie Williams as Belle Emerson
- Alice Knowland (uncredited)
- Lucien Littlefield (uncredited)

== Preservation ==
With no prints of All Souls' Eve located in any film archives, it is considered a lost film.
