= Miss Hobbs =

1920 film directed by Donald Crisp

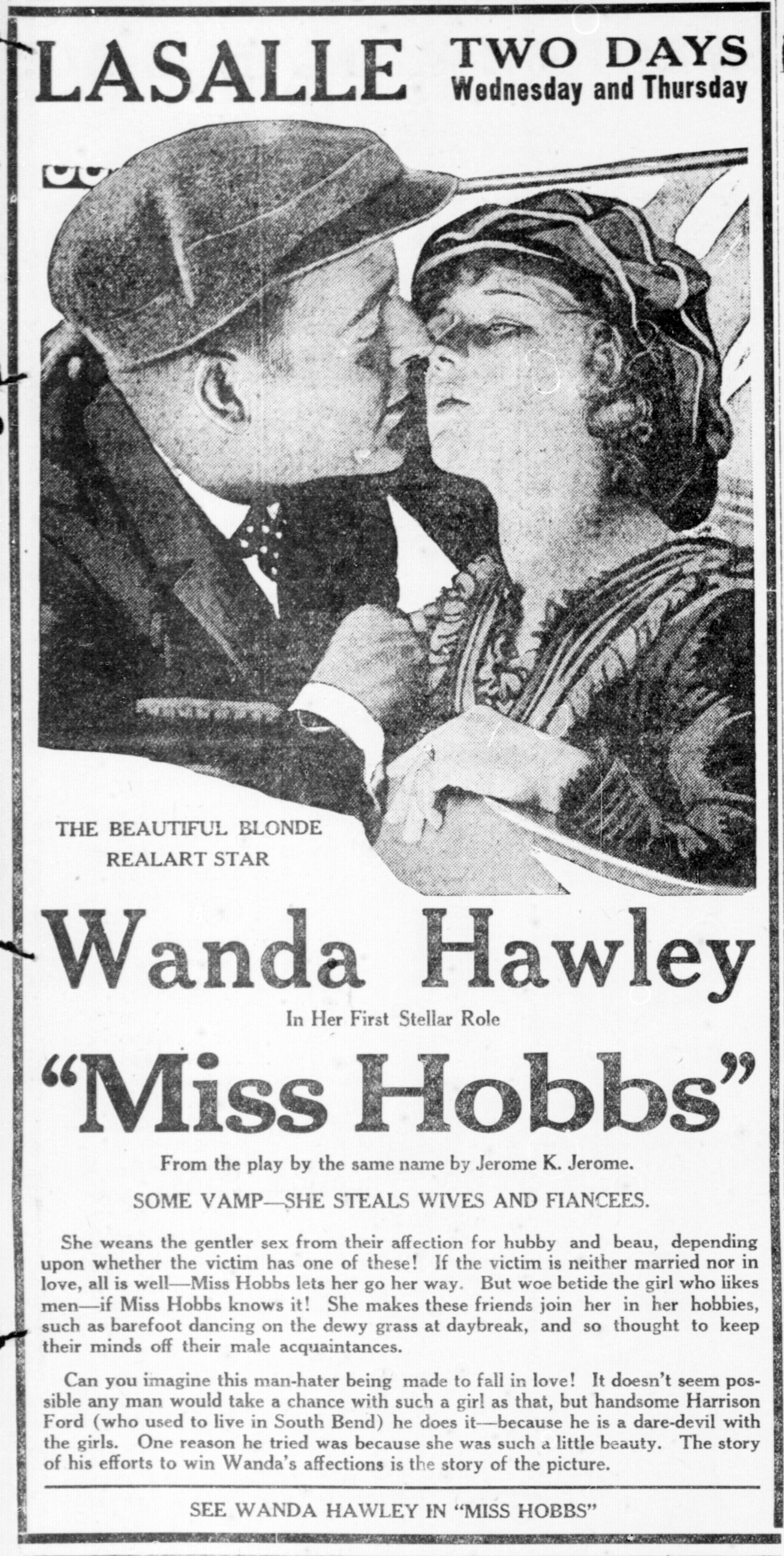
- Newspaper advertisement
- Directed by: Donald Crisp
- Screenplay by: Elmer Blaney Harris
- Based on: Miss Hobbs by Jerome K. Jerome
- Starring: Wanda Hawley; Harrison Ford; Helen Jerome Eddy; Walter Hiers
- Cinematography: Charles Schoenbaum
- Production company: Realart Pictures Corporation
- Distributed by: Realart Pictures Corporation
- Release date: May 19, 1920
- Running time: 60 minutes
- Country: United States
- Language: Silent (English intertitles)

Miss Hobbs is a 1920 American silent comedy film directed by Donald Crisp and written by Elmer Blaney Harris. The film stars Wanda Hawley, Harrison Ford, Helen Jerome Eddy, Walter Hiers, Julanne Johnston, and Emily Chichester. The film was released on May 19, 1920, by Realart Pictures Corporation.

== Plot ==
According to a contemporary newspaper, the story concerns a "man-hater" falling in love.

== Cast ==
- Wanda Hawley as Miss Hobbs
- Harrison Ford as Wolff Kingsearl
- Helen Jerome Eddy as Beulah Hackett
- Walter Hiers as George Jessup
- Julanne Johnston as Millicent Farey
- Emily Chichester as Alice Joy
- Frances Raymond as Mrs. Kingsearl
- Jack Mulhall as Percy Hackett
