= Oh, Lady, Lady =

1920 film

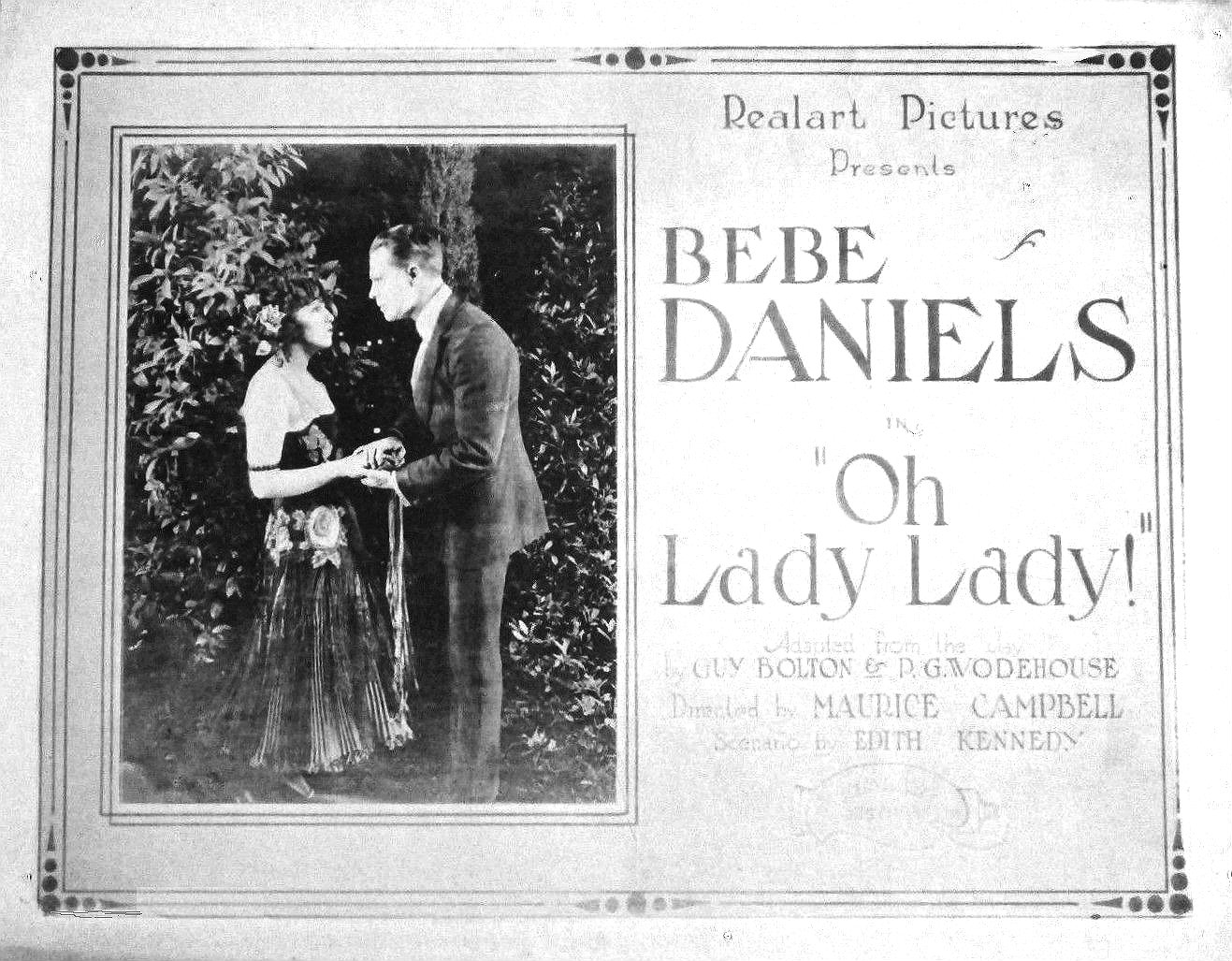
- Lobby card
- Directed by: Major Maurice Campbell
- Written by: Edith Kennedy (scenario)
- Based on: Oh, Lady! Lady!! by Guy Bolton and P. G. Wodehouse
- Produced by: Adolph Zukor
- Starring: Bebe Daniels
- Cinematography: H. Kinley Martin
- Production company: Realart Pictures Corporation
- Distributed by: Realart Pictures Corporation
- Release date: November 1920
- Running time: 50 minutes
- Country: United States
- Language: Silent (English intertitles)

Oh, Lady, Lady is a lost 1920 American silent comedy romance film directed by Major Maurice Campbell and starring Bebe Daniels, based on the popular 1918 Broadway stage musical Oh, Lady! Lady!!

Maurice Campbell was the husband of actress Henrietta Crosman. He usually worked on Broadway as a director or producer. Oh, Lady, Lady is his first feature-length directorial silent film effort.

== Plot ==
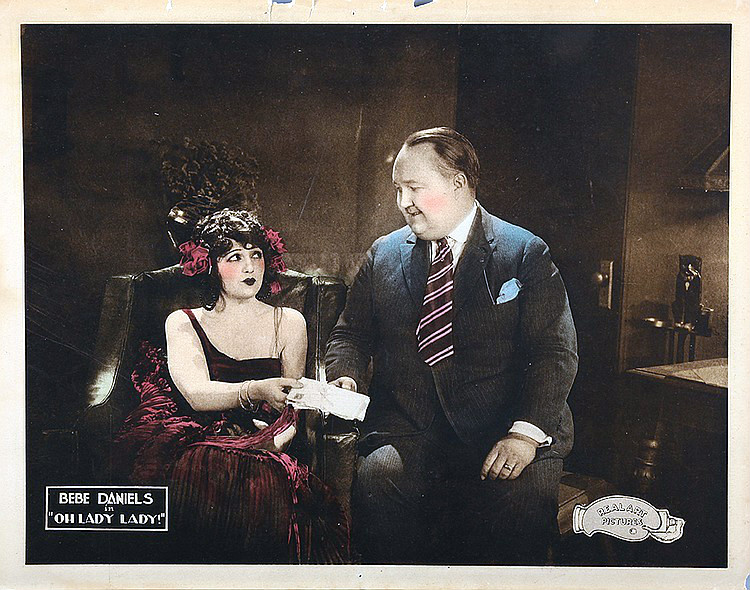
Colorized lobby card for Oh, Lady, Lady (1920).

As described in a film magazine, Mary Barber returns to her birthplace as Rita Rooke, an actress, and finds her former sweetheart Willoughby Finch engaged and about to be married to a Miss Farringdon. She telephones Finch that she is in town and will call on him at 4 p.m. A rehearsal of the wedding ceremony is scheduled for 5 o'clock. A reporter is called in to assist Finch out of his dilemma. He suggests getting someone to pose as Finch's sweetheart to get him out of difficulty. The reporter gets the actress to dress as a vamp and appear on the scene. Complications follow when Mary mistakes the rehearsal for the wedding ceremony. The engagement between Molly Farringdon and Finch is broken. Then when she attempts to straighten things out, Mary is found at Finch's studio by Molly. Eventually explanations are made to clear things up.

== Cast ==
- Bebe Daniels as Mary Barber
- Harrison Ford as Hale Underwood
- Walter Hiers as Willoughby Finch
- Charlotte Woods as Molly Farringdon
- Lillian Langdon as Mrs. Farringdon
- Jack Doud as Alec Smart
- Barbara Maier as Little Girl (unbilled)
