= Her Gilded Cage =

1922 film

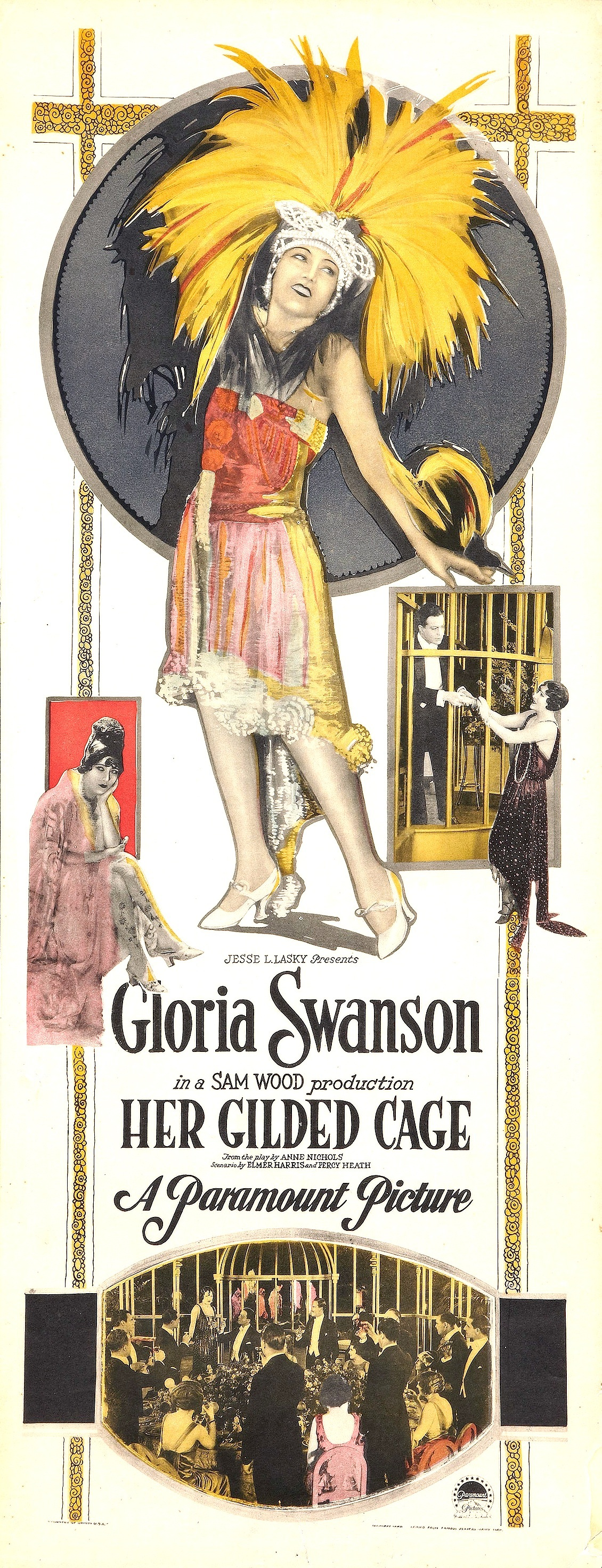
- Film poster
- Directed by: Sam Wood
- Written by: Percy Heath
- Based on: The Love Dreams by Elmer Harris and Anne Nichols
- Starring: Gloria Swanson
- Cinematography: Alfred Gilks
- Distributed by: Paramount Pictures
- Release date: April 5, 1922
- Running time: 60 minutes
- Country: United States
- Language: Silent (English intertitles)

Her Gilded Cage is a 1922 American silent drama film directed by Sam Wood and starring Gloria Swanson. The film was based on the play The Love Dreams by Elmer Harris and Anne Nichols.

== Plot ==
As described in a film magazine review, in order to support her crippled sister Jacqueline and possibly finance a cure, Suzanne Ornoff accepts a position as a cabaret dancer. An American traveling in Paris falls in love with her, but when he learns of her profession, he will have nothing to do with her. Broken hearted, she goes to the United States where she meets his brother, and the brother falls in love with her, too. Although he is warned that the young woman is not worthy, he disregards his brother's warning, and continues his romance with her. When it is discovered that Suzanne is doing all of this for her sister, the objections are overcome and it ends happily for all persons concerned.

== Cast ==
- Gloria Swanson as Suzanne Ornoff
- David Powell as Arnold Pell
- Harrison Ford as Lawrence Pell
- Anne Cornwall as Jacqueline Ornoff
- Walter Hiers as Bud Walton
- Charles A. Stevenson as Gaston Petitfils

== Preservation ==
With no prints of Her Gilded Cage located in any film archives, it is a lost film.
