= An Amateur Devil =

1920 film by Maurice Campbell

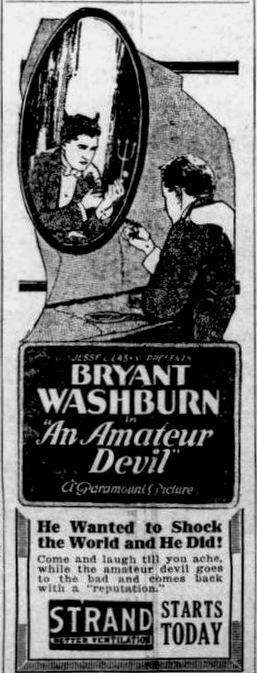
- Newspaper ad
- Directed by: Maurice Campbell
- Screenplay by: Douglas Bronston
- Based on: "Wanted: A Blemish" by Henry J. Buxton; Jessie Henderson
- Starring: Bryant Washburn; Charles Wingate; Ann May; Sidney Bracey; Graham Pettie; Anna Dodge
- Cinematography: H. Kinley Martin
- Production company: Famous Players–Lasky Corporation
- Distributed by: Paramount Pictures
- Release date: December 19, 1920
- Running time: 50 minutes
- Country: United States
- Language: Silent (English intertitles)

An Amateur Devil is a 1920 American silent comedy film directed by Maurice Campbell and written by Douglas Bronston based upon the short story "Wanted: A Blemish" by Henry J. Buxton and Jessie Henderson. The film stars Bryant Washburn, Charles Wingate, Ann May, Sidney Bracey, Graham Pettie, and Anna Dodge. The film was released on December 19, 1920, by Paramount Pictures. It is not known whether the film currently survives.

== Plot ==
As described in a film magazine, Carver Endicott, born into wealth, has a sweetheart Margaret who has become boresome to him. To stimulate his interest, his father, a dashing old beau, pretends an affection for the young woman. She, in exasperation, accepts his proposal. The plan works and rouses Carver to come up with a scheme of besmirching the family name to prevent the wedding. He poses as a hired farmhand, a dishwasher, and then a hotel bus boy. In the latter capacity he invites the attention of a young musical queen. It turns out that she is the former wife of his valet. His relationship with his sweetheart Margaret is resumed, and they receive a telegram announcing his father's marriage to the actress.

== Cast ==
- Bryant Washburn as Carver Endicott
- Charles Wingate as His Father
- Ann May as His Sweetheart
- Sidney Bracey as His Valet
- Graham Pettie as Farmer Brown
- Anna Dodge as Mrs. Brown
- Christine Mayo as A Musical Comedy Star
- Norris Johnson as Her Daughter
