= Her Own Money =

1922 film by Joseph Henabery

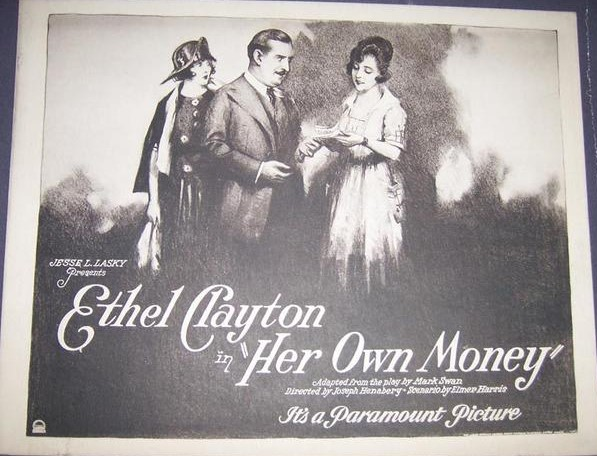
- lobby card
- Directed by: Joseph Henabery
- Written by: Elmer Harris (scenario)
- Based on: Her Own Money by Mark Swan
- Produced by: Adolph Zukor; Jesse Lasky
- Cinematography: Faxon M. Dean
- Production company: Famous Players–Lasky Corporation
- Distributed by: Paramount Pictures
- Release date: January 1922
- Running time: 50 minutes
- Country: United States
- Language: Silent (English intertitles)

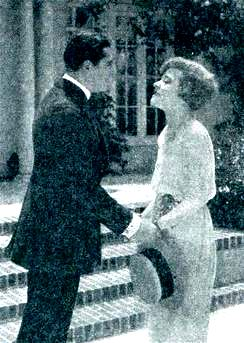
scene in the film, Warner Baxter and Ethel Clayton

Her Own Money is a 1922 American silent comedy film directed by Joseph Henabery, starring Warner Baxter and Ethel Clayton. Based upon a play, it was originally filmed in 1914 and featured Baxter in a small part. It is unknown whether the 1922 film currently survives.

== Plot ==
As described in a film magazine, Mildred Carr is a working class wife who has saved her money and marries Lew Alden, a struggling business man. After five years of married life, a financial crisis occurs so Mildred loans her husband her savings apparently through a third party, which causes Lew to leave her when he discovers the fraud. She goes back to work and, after he regains his losses, he asks her forgiveness and they make up.

== Cast ==
- Ethel Clayton as Mildred Carr
- Warner Baxter as Lew Alden
- Charles K. French as Thomas Hazelton
- Clarence Burton as Harvey Beecher
- Mae Busch as Flora Conroy
- Jean Acker as Ruth Alden
- Roscoe Karns as Jerry Woodward
