= Midnight (1922 film) =

1922 film by Maurice Campbell

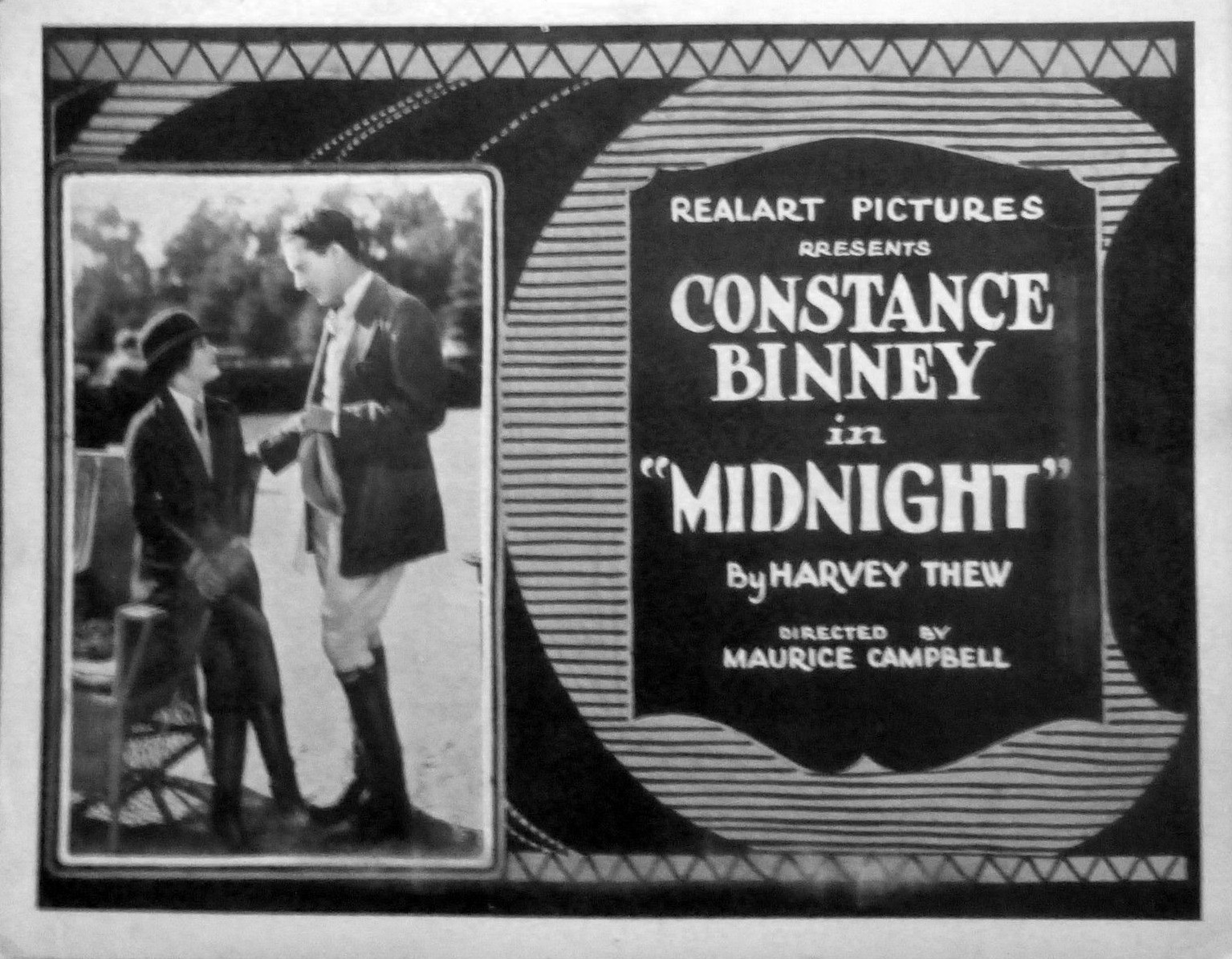
- Lobby card
- Directed by: Maurice Campbell
- Screenplay by: Harvey F. Thew
- Starring: Constance Binney; William Courtleigh; Sidney Bracey; Arthur Stuart Hull; Herbert Fortier; Helen Lynch; Edward Martindel
- Cinematography: H. Kinley Martin
- Production company: Realart Pictures Corporation
- Distributed by: Paramount Pictures
- Release date: February 19, 1922
- Running time: 50 minutes
- Country: United States
- Language: Silent (English intertitles)

Midnight is a lost 1922 American silent drama film directed by Maurice Campbell and written by Harvey F. Thew. The film stars Constance Binney, William Courtleigh, Sidney Bracey, Arthur Stuart Hull, Herbert Fortier, Helen Lynch, and Edward Martindel. The film was released on February 19, 1922, by Paramount Pictures.

== Plot ==
As described in a film magazine, Edna Morris, daughter of William Morris, American ambassador to a South American country, is inveigled into a hasty marriage with George Potter, an attache of the embassy. That same day George is threatened with arrest for embezzlement and escapes by leaping into the bay. He is believed drowned. Edna's father resigns his post and they return to their American home. On an adjoining estate is Senator Dart and his son Jack. Edna falls in love with Jack and their engagement is announced. George returns and attempts to blackmail Edna's father, who then forbids the marriage of Edna and Jack. However, the couple elope and are married right at midnight. Upon their return home, Edna finds George's body in the library. The butler clears up the mystery, stating that he shot the man in the dark, thinking he was a burglar. A bullet from Potter's gun hit the wall clock and it shows that the shooting occurred ten minutes before midnight.

== Cast ==
- Constance Binney as Edna Morris
- William Courtleigh as William Morris
- Sidney Bracey as Dodd
- Arthur Stuart Hull as George Potter
- Herbert Fortier as Bishop Astor
- Helen Lynch as Grace Astor
- Edward Martindel as Senator Dart
- Jack Mulhall as Jack Dart
