= Two Weeks with Pay =

1921 film

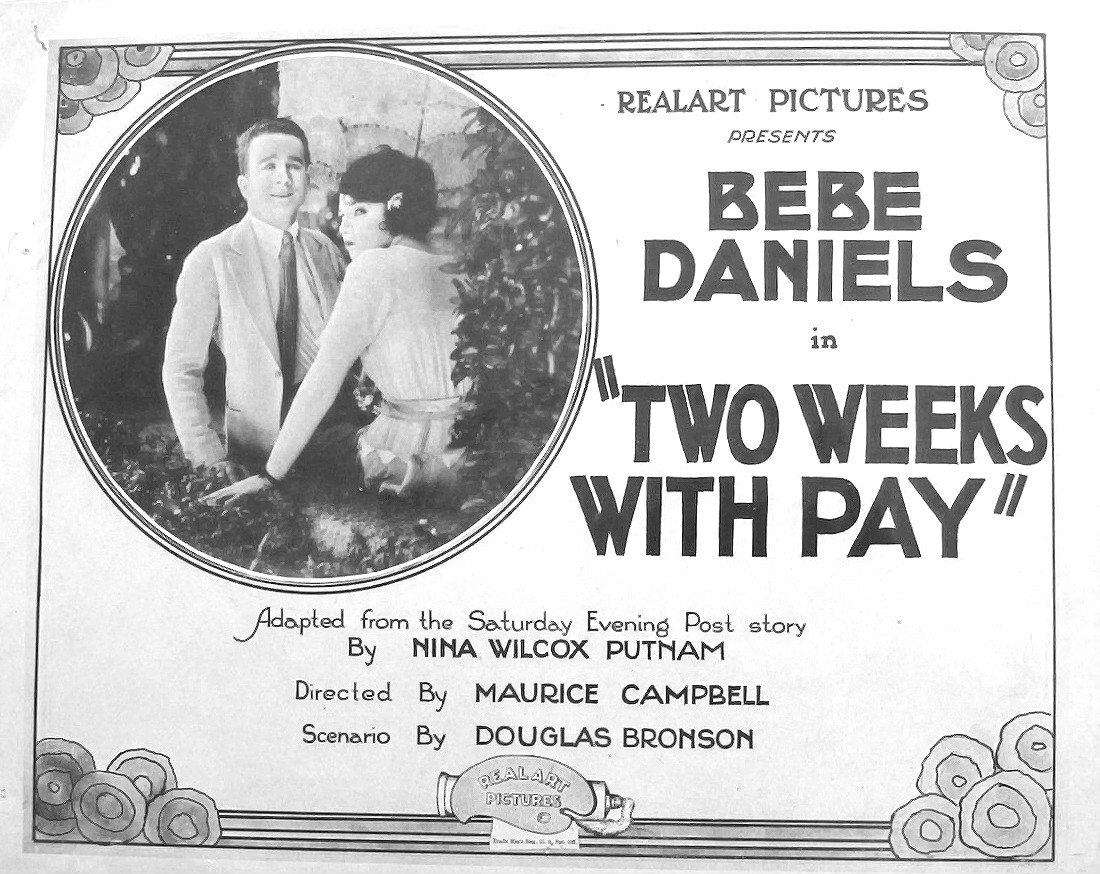
- Lobby card
- Directed by: Maurice Campbell
- Written by: Nina Wilcox Putnam (story); Alice Eyton (screenplay, adaptation)
- Starring: Bebe Daniels
- Cinematography: H. Kinley Martin
- Production company: Realart Pictures Corporation
- Distributed by: Realart Pictures Corporation
- Release date: May 1921
- Running time: 5 or 6 reels
- Country: United States
- Language: Silent (English intertitles)

Two Weeks with Pay is a lost 1921 American silent comedy romance film starring Bebe Daniels and directed by Maurice Campbell.

== Cast ==
- Bebe Daniels as Pansy O'Donnell / Marie La Tour
- Jack Mulhall as J. Livingston Smith
- Jim Mason as Montague Fox
- George Periolat as Ginsberg
- Frances Raymond as Mrs. Wainsworth
- Polly Moran as Chambermaid
- Walter Hiers as Hotel Clerk
