= John Waters (director, born 1893) =

American film director (1893–1965)

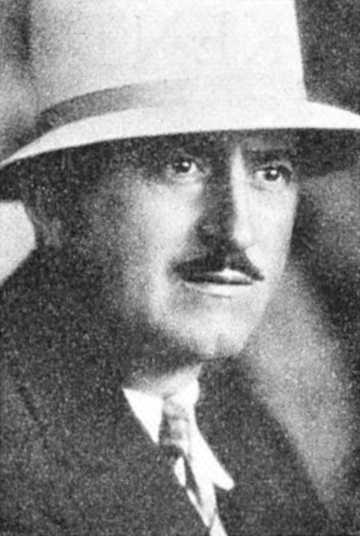
- Born: October 31, 1893; New York City, US
- Died: May 6, 1965 (aged 71); Woodland Hills, California, US
- Occupation: Film director

John Waters (October 31, 1893 – May 6, 1965) was an American film director, second unit director and, initially, an assistant director. His career began in the early days of silent film and culminated in two consecutive Academy Award nominations in the newly instituted (but short-lived) category of Best Assistant Director. He won on his second nomination, for MGM's Viva Villa!, and received a certificate of merit; the certificate was replaced with an Oscar statuette in 1965.

== Assistant director and director during 1910s and 1920s ==
A native of New York City, John Waters entered the motion picture industry in its formative years. Only a few of his assistant director credits from the 1910s have been recorded, with vehicles for Carlyle Blackwell (The Shadow of a Doubt, 1916) and Harold Lockwood (The Avenging Trail, 1917) listed among the earliest titles. During this initial phase of his career, he was billed on at least two occasions as John S. Waters and on at least one occasion as Johnnie Waters.

In 1926, he was offered a position as director with Famous Players–Lasky and, over a two-year period, turned out ten films, five of which (Born to the West, Forlorn River, Man of the Forest, The Mysterious Rider and The Vanishing Pioneer) were based on the series of popular western fiction novels by Zane Grey and starred Famous Players' reigning western hero, Jack Holt. There were two additional Zane Grey adaptations, Drums of the Desert (starring Warner Baxter) and Nevada, while an eighth western, 1927's Arizona Bound, Waters' sole sagebrush saga not based on Zane Grey, starred Gary Cooper in his first leading role. Although he did not direct Cooper's second starring western, The Last Outlaw, the new star's third lead western, Nevada, was once again assigned to Waters, along with another Cooper vehicle, the French Foreign Legion epic, Beau Sabreur, a sequel to Famous Players' biggest hit of 1926, Beau Geste, which starred Ronald Colman.

Rounding out Waters' ten assignments was a single comedy, the W. C. Fields–Chester Conklin vehicle, Two Flaming Youths, which he also produced. In 1928, a few months after Famous Players–Lasky's September 1927 reorganization under the name Paramount Famous Lasky Corporation, Waters left the studio to begin a lengthy sojourn with MGM, where his initial directorial assignments consisted of two Tim McCoy series westerns, The Overland Telegraph and Sioux Blood which, when released in March and April 1929, respectively, were among MGM's last silent features.

== Assistant director at MGM ==
At this point, as the talkie revolution transformed Hollywood, Waters, now an MGM contractee, returned to his former profession as assistant director, an industry job title which, during a brief period covering five Academy Award cycles (1932–33 to 1937), became eligible for an Oscar. On March 16, 1934, at the first Awards ceremony featuring the new category, John Waters was among eighteen nominees who were singled out for the totality of their achievement at the studio which employed them, rather than for a single feature. Each studio had two or three nominees, with Charles Dorian and Orville O. Dull rounding out, along with Waters, the MGM contingent. Ultimately, there were seven winners that year, one of them Dorian.

The following year, after considerable streamlining, the nominations were pared down to three and categorized according to each nominee's work on a specific film. Only John Waters, among the previous year's eighteen nominees, was renominated, as his contribution to Wallace Beery's portrayal of Mexican revolutionary leader Pancho Villa won against two Claudette Colbert–Warren William titles represented by assistant directors Scott Beal (Imitation of Life) and Cullen Tate (Cleopatra).

Although known in the industry, Waters, along with other studio-employed assistant directors and second unit directors, did not have his name listed in the credits of Viva Villa! as well a great majority of the other titles for which he fulfilled those functions. Other than a 1935 one-reel Pete Smith Specialty, Donkey Baseball, his sole directorial assignment in the sound era was The Mighty McGurk, MGM's 1946 vehicle for his old Viva Villa! compatriot, Wallace Beery.

Twelve years later, after working as second unit director on two big-budget 1958 releases, Warner's The Deep Six and the independently produced The Big Country, John Waters was admitted as a patient to the Motion Picture Country House and Hospital in the Los Angeles suburb of Woodland Hills, where he died seven years later at the age of 71. The New York Times' May 8, 1965 obituary, under the heading "John S. Waters", described him as "a pioneer motion picture director" who "was 70 years old", and stated that "his widow, Frances, survives".

== Filmography ==
=== Silent films ===
- Down Home (1920)
- The Enchanted Hill (1926)
- Born to the West (1926)
- Forlorn River (1926)
- Man of the Forest (1926)
- The Mysterious Rider (1927)
- Drums of the Desert (1927)
- The Vanishing Pioneer (1928)
- Arizona Bound (1927)
- Nevada (1927)
- Two Flaming Youths (1927)
- Beau Sabreur (1928)
- The Overland Telegraph (1929)
- Sioux Blood (1929)

=== Sound films ===
- Just a Gigolo (1931)
- Arsène Lupin (1932)
- Huddle (1932)
- Divorce in the Family (1932)
- The Mask of Fu Manchu (1932)
- Hell Below (1933)
- The Barbarian (1933)
- Broadway to Hollywood (1933)
- Viva Villa! (1934) 1935 Academy Award, Best Assistant Director
- Death on the Diamond (1934)
- David Copperfield (1935)
- Donkey Baseball (1935)
- Let Freedom Ring (1939)
- 6,000 Enemies (1939)
- Ninotchka (1939)
- Boom Town (1940)
- The Mighty McGurk (1947)
- The Deep Six (1958)
- The Big Country (1958)
