= Charles Schoenbaum =

American cinematographer

Charles Schoenbaum A. S. C.
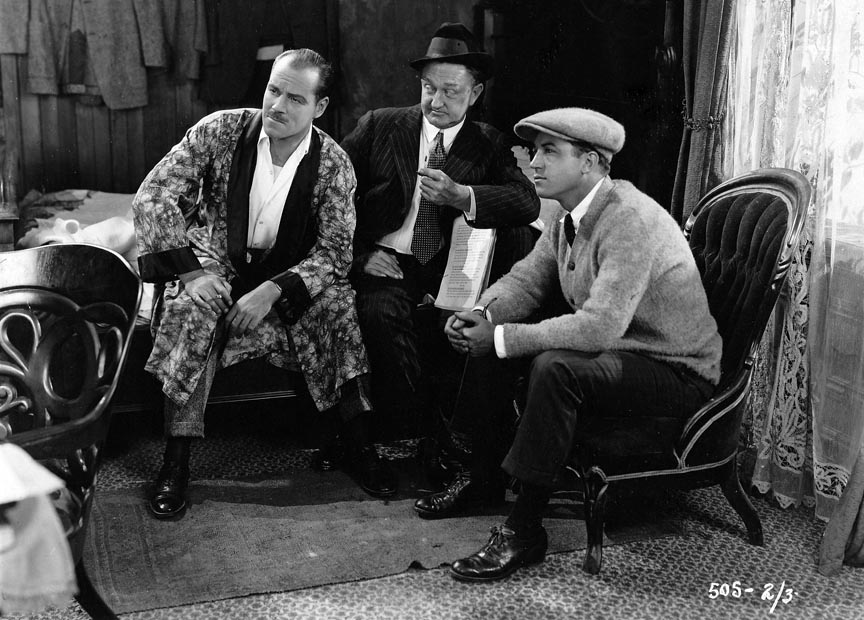
- Jack Holt, Wallace Worsley, and Charles Schoenbaum on the set of Nobody's Money (1923)
- Born: Charles Edgar Schoenbaum; April 28, 1893; Los Angeles, California, U.S.
- Died: January 21, 1951 (aged 57); Beverly Hills, California, U.S.
- Occupation: Cinematographer
- Spouse: Hazel Faye Pfeiffer Schoenbaum
- Children: Vera Marie Schoenbaum Gebbert (playwright) (1916-2014); Charles Layton Schoenbaum (1917-1918).

Charles Edgar Schoenbaum A. S. C. (April 28, 1893 – January 21, 1951) was an American cinematographer. His known film credits began in 1917—although he probably had earlier films—and ended with his untimely death from cancer in 1951 at age 57. He was nominated for an Academy Award in 1949 for his work on Little Women.

== Early life ==
He was born in Los Angeles, California, to Anna A. Campbell (age 20) and William E. Schoenbaum (age 22). His brother was Hollywood still photographer Emmett Schoenbaum, and the latter named a son after him.

== Career ==
He began working for Fox Film sometime in the 1910s. Some of the stars he worked with closely were Elizabeth Taylor, W. C. Fields, Mickey Rooney, Gary Cooper, Norma Shearer, Wallace Reid, Abbott and Costello, Chester Morris, Wallace Beery, and many others.

Schoenbaum worked on over 100 films, including several of the Lassie films in the late 1940s. Jeanette MacDonald (who was a dog lover), joked to him, "I've come to this, working with a dog!" He was frequently a cinematographer for Cecil B. DeMille, Louis B. Mayer, Jesse Lasky, and his good friend Victor Fleming. Schoenbaum was also known for Westerns, often shooting on location in the American Southwest and Canada. In 1926 he was listed as a "staff cinematographer" for Lasky.

Known for his prodigious work ethic, it even became a bit of a joke in the profession. For the new year's issue of The American CInematographer in 1922, the editors wrote "Charles E. Schoenbaum will call it a happy New Year if he can crank every one of the 365 days of 1922. If he can be guaranteed this Charles E. won't even ask for a lay-off between pictures. This boy certainly does love to work." When director Rouben Mamoulian capriciously fired Oscar-winning cinematographer Charles Rosher from Summer Holiday (1948), he replaced him with Schoenbaum. Cinematographer Karl Brown called Schoenbaum one of the "notable studio photographers," and interviewed him for a Photoplay article on technique. His ongoing pictures and past work were often mentioned in the "In Camerafornia" column or other sections of the trade magazine The American Cinematographer.

== Other work ==
He sometimes registered screenplays under the pseudonym "Charles Edgar.", He was also frequently uncredited on films when he was brought in on other people's projects to help fix problems. Some of his films are also missing because he worked under different versions of his name, C. Edgar Schoenbaum, Charles E. Schoenbaum, and C. E. Schoenbaum. For archival research purposes, sometimes it has been misspelled "Shoenbaum."

== Personal life ==
He married Hazel Faye Pfeiffer on February 11, 1915, in Los Angeles. They had a daughter, Vera Marie, on October 9, 1916, and a son, Charles Layton, in 1917. The son died at age six months. The daughter became a playwright, lived to be 98, and enjoyed sharing her stories of old Hollywood with various researchers. The family lived in Beverly Hills, where their daughter Vera attended Beverly Hills High School from 1930-34.

Vera Schoenbaum (later Gebbert), under the pen name Vera Mathews, had one play on Broadway. She worked for Broadway agent Audrey Wood, and worked closely with playwright Tennessee Williams. Her play Third Cousin was performed at Margo Jones' Theater-in-the-Round in 1947, where actor Jack Warden was just getting started, and also where Tennessee Williams debuted his first play. She corresponded for years with C. S. Lewis, and is in his collected letters. She was also Edward Baron Turk's source of information on her father and Jeanette MacDonald, and she once helped her friend MacDonald walk her dogs during breaks on the long train ride from California to New York.

Charles Edgar Schoenbaum is buried at Holy Cross Cemetery in Culver City, California.

== Partial filmography ==
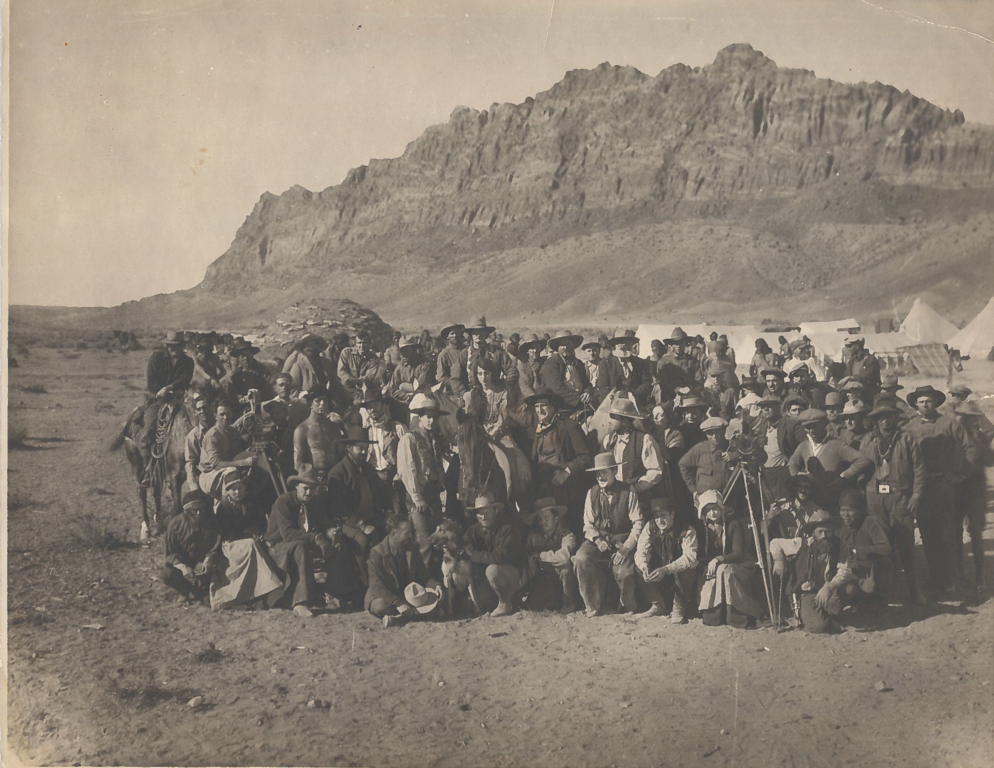
On the set of The Heritage of the Desert in 1924. Schoenbaum is probably wearing a cap at center right, with one hand in his pocket and the other on the camera.

- The Woman God Forgot (1917)
- The Girl Who Came Back (1918)
- The Mystery Girl (1918)
- The Way of a Man with a Maid (1918)
- Women's Weapons (1918)
- A Very Good Young Man (1919)
- Fires of Faith (1919)
- Hawthorne of the U.S.A. (1919)
- An Adventure in Hearts (1919)
- Something to Do (1919)
- The Best Man (1919 film) (1919)
- The Winning Girl (1919)
- The Woman Next Door (1919)
- Venus in the East (1919)
- It Pays to Advertise (1919)
- Love Insurance (1919)
- Why Smith Left Home (1919)
- Too Much Johnson (1919)
- Always Audacious (1920)
- Burglar Proof (1920)
- Held by the Enemy (1920)
- Miss Hobbs (1920)
- The Six Best Cellars (1920)
- Exit the Vamp (1921)
- The Hell Diggers (1921)
- The Love Special (1921)
- Too Much Speed (1921)
- Sham (1921)
- The Charm School (1921)
- Across the Continent (1922)
- On the High Seas (1922)
- Rent Free (1922)
- The World's Champion (1922)
- The Siren Call (1922)
- The Heart Raider (1923)
- Mr. Billings Spends His Dime (1923)
- Nobody's Money (1923)
- Empty Hands (1924)
- Code of the Sea (1924)
- The Heritage of the Desert (1924)
- A Son of His Father (1925)
- The Devil's Cargo (1925)
- The Vanishing American (1925)
- In the Name of Love (1925)
- Adventure (1925)
- Desert Gold (1926)
- Forlorn River (1926)
- Man of the Forest (1926)
- The Last Frontier (1926)
- Born to the West (1926)
- Arizona Bound (1927)
- Drums of the Desert (1927)
- Nevada (1927)
- The Mysterious Rider (1927)
- The Vanishing Pioneer (1928)
- The Water Hole (1928)
- Beau Sabreur (1928)
- The Vanishing Pioneer (1928)
- Under the Tonto Rim (1928)
- Sally (1929)
- Bride of the Regiment (1930)
- She Got What She Wanted (1930)
- The Rogue Song (1930)
- Bright Lights (1930)
- Command Performance (1931)
- Hell Bound (1931)
- Woman Hungry (1931)
- Women Go on Forever (1931)
- Salvation Nell (1931)
- Men Are Such Fools (1932)
- If I Had a Million (1932)
- Goodbye Love (1933)
- Sailor Be Good (1933)
- Racetrack (1933)
- Skyway (1933)
- Kickin' the Crown Around (short, 1933)
- Tomorrow at Seven (1933)
- Here Comes the Band (1935)
- It's in the Air (1935)
- Rainbow on the River (1936)
- Daughter of Shanghai (1937)
- Love on Toast (1937)
- On Such a Night (1937)
- Secret Valley (1937)
- Sons of the Legion (1938)
- Escape to Paradise (1939)
- Fisherman's Wharf (1939)
- Way Down South (1939)
- Honeymoon in Bali (uncredited, 1939)
- Always a Bride (1940)
- New York Town (1941)
- Junior Army (1942)
- Unexpected Riches (Our Gang short, 1942)
- Hi Diddle Diddle (1943)
- Salute to the Marines (1943)
- Portrait of a Genius (short, 1943)
- Benjamin Franklin, Jr. (Our Gang short, 1943)
- Return from Nowhere (short, 1944)
- Abbott and Costello in Hollywood (1945)
- Son of Lassie (1945)
- Bad Bascomb (1946)
- Cynthia (1947)
- Good News (1947)
- The Mighty McGurk (1947)
- Hills of Home (Lassie series, 1948)
- Summer Holiday (1948)
- Annie Was a Wonder (1949)
- Challenge to Lassie (1949)
- Little Women (1949)
- Stars in My Crown (1950)
- The Outriders (1950)
- Duchess of Idaho (1950)
