= Sioux Blood =

1929 film

- Lobby card
- Directed by: John Waters
- Written by: Harry Sinclair Drago (story); George C. Hull (scenario); Houston Branch (adaptation); Lucille Newmark (intertitles)
- Produced by: MGM
- Starring: Tim McCoy
- Cinematography: Arthur Reed
- Edited by: William LeVanway
- Distributed by: MGM
- Release date: April 20, 1929
- Running time: 60 minutes
- Country: United States
- Languages: Silent; English intertitles

Sioux Blood is a 1929 American silent Western film directed by John Waters. It stars Western action star Tim McCoy. A print is preserved at the George Eastman House in New York.

== Cast ==
- Tim McCoy as Flood
- Robert Frazer as Lone Eagle
- Ena Gregory as Barbara Ingram (* as Marian Douglas)
- Clarence Geldart as Miles Ingram (* as Clarence Geldert)
- Chief John Big Tree as Crazy Wolf (* as Chief Big Tree)
- Sidney Bracey as Cheyenne Jones (* as Sidney Bracy)
