= The Overland Telegraph =

1929 film by John Water

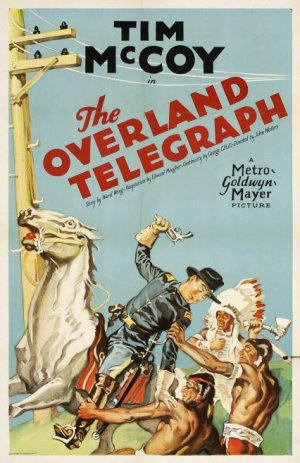
- Theatrical release poster
- Directed by: John Waters
- Screenplay by: Harry Sinclair Drago; George C. Hull; Edward J. Meagher
- Story by: Ward Wing
- Starring: Tim McCoy; Dorothy Janis; Frank Rice; Lawford Davidson; Clarence Geldart; Chief John Big Tree
- Cinematography: Arthur Reed
- Edited by: William LeVanway
- Production company: Metro-Goldwyn-Mayer
- Distributed by: Metro-Goldwyn-Mayer
- Release date: March 2, 1929
- Running time: 55 minutes
- Country: United States
- Languages: Silent; English intertitles

The Overland Telegraph is a 1929 American silent Western film directed by John Waters and written by Harry Sinclair Drago, George C. Hull and Edward J. Meagher. The film stars Tim McCoy, Dorothy Janis, Frank Rice, Lawford Davidson, Clarence Geldart and Chief John Big Tree. The film was released on March 2, 1929, by Metro-Goldwyn-Mayer.

== Cast ==
- Tim McCoy as Captain Allen
- Dorothy Janis as Dorothy
- Frank Rice as Easy
- Lawford Davidson as Briggs
- Clarence Geldart as Major Hammond
- Chief John Big Tree as Medicine Man

== Preservation ==
- The film was preserved by MGM and a copy donated for preservation to George Eastman House.

== See also ==
- List of films and television shows about the American Civil War
