= Drums of the Desert =

Drums of the Desert may refer to:

- Drums of the Desert (1927 film)
- Drums of the Desert (1940 film)
