= Empty Hands (film) =

1924 film by Victor Fleming

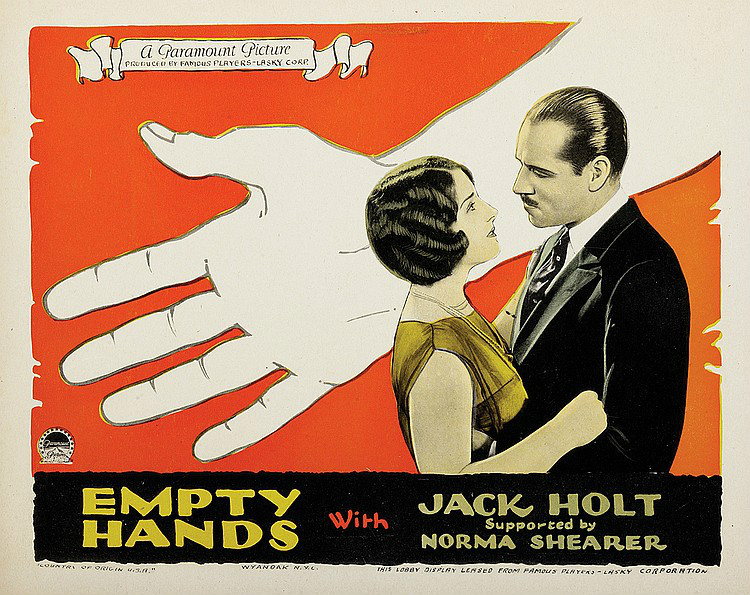
- Lobby card
- Directed by: Victor Fleming
- Written by: Carey Wilson
- Story by: Arthur Stringer
- Produced by: Famous Players–Lasky
- Starring: Jack Holt; Norma Shearer; Charles Clary; Hazel Keener
- Cinematography: Charles Edgar Schoenbaum
- Edited by: Howard Hawks
- Distributed by: Paramount Pictures
- Release date: August 17, 1924 (United States)
- Running time: 70 mins.
- Country: United States
- Language: Silent (English intertitles)

Empty Hands is a 1924 American silent romantic drama film directed by Victor Fleming, and starring Jack Holt and Norma Shearer. The film was produced by the Famous Players–Lasky and distributed by Paramount Pictures.

== Cast ==
- Jack Holt as Grimshaw
- Norma Shearer as Claire Endicott
- Charles Clary as Robert Endicott
- Hazel Keener as Mrs. Endicott
- Gertrude Olmstead as Typsy
- Ramsey Wallace as Montie
- Ward Crane as Milt Bisnet
- Charles Stevens as Indian Guide
- Hank Mann as Spring Water Man
- Charles Green as Butler

== Preservation ==
With no prints of Empty Hands located in any film archives, it is a lost film.
