= Too Much Johnson (1919 film) =

1919 film by Donald Crisp

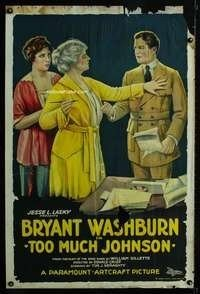
- Film poster
- Directed by: Donald Crisp
- Written by: Thomas J. Geraghty (scenario)
- Based on: Too Much Johnson by William Gillette
- Produced by: Adolph Zukor; Jesse Lasky
- Starring: Bryant Washburn; Lois Wilson
- Cinematography: Charles Schoenbaum
- Edited by: Nan Heron; Dorothy Arzner
- Distributed by: Paramount Pictures - Artcraft
- Release date: December 1919
- Running time: 5 reels
- Country: United States
- Language: Silent (English intertitles)

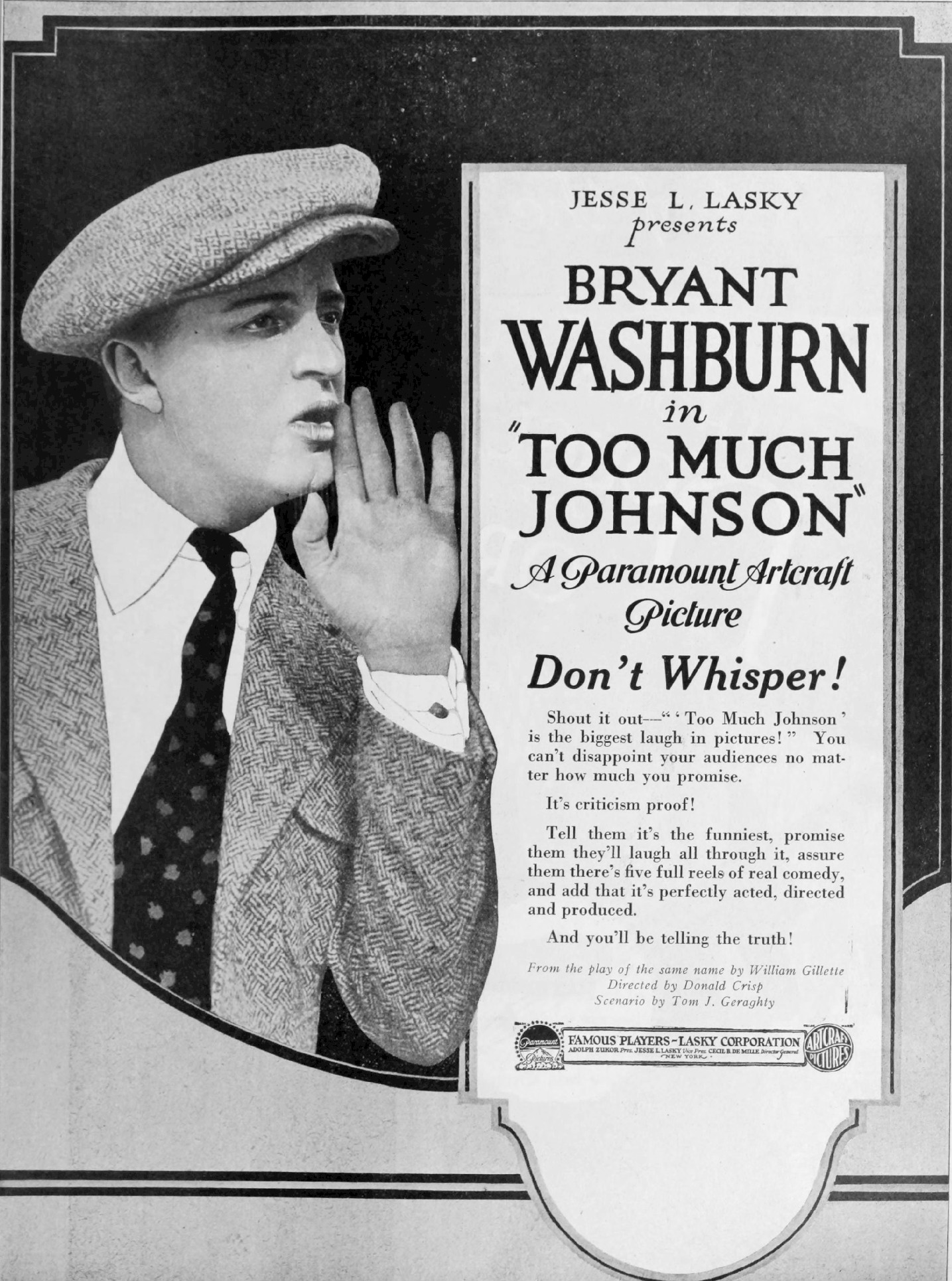
Trade advertisement.

Too Much Johnson is a lost 1919 American silent comedy film produced by Famous Players–Lasky and distributed by Paramount Pictures. It was directed by Donald Crisp during his phase as an important film director. This film stars in the leads Bryant Washburn and Lois Wilson.

This film is based on William Gillette's 1894 play Too Much Johnson and is the second film attempt at the play, the first having been a short in 1900. Famously, Orson Welles made a short and unfinished film adaptation of the play in 1938, and he may have not known of this feature silent from 1919.

== Plot ==
As described in a film magazine, Augustus Billings, who lives in deadly fear of his mother-in-law Mrs. Batterson, risks fate by taking a yacht trip with his friend Billy Lounsberry, who owns some oil wells in Mexico. Augustus' alibi to his wife is that he has purchased an interest in the oil wells and has been called there to look after them. The yacht is owned by a romantic married woman to whom Augustus is introduced as "Johnson." Boat owner Mrs. Dathis carries on a flirtation with "Johnson" and invites him on another cruise.

Plans for the second cruise are foiled when the jealous Leon Dathis finds out about the planned outing, and begins a search for "Johnson." To further complicate the plot, Mrs. Billings and her mother decide to accompany Augustus on his second trip. Caught, Augustus books passage on a steamer to Mexico and takes his wife and mother-in-law along. On the same boat goes the jealous Mr. Dathis. Meanwhile, Billy Lounsberry sells his oil wells to a Mr. Johnson and departs Mexico. Meanwhile, also on the steamer is a young woman Leonora who is to marry this Mr. Johnson through a mail arrangement, along with her father and disappointed sweetheart Henry. This leads to several difficulties, which are resolved when the seven reach the Johnson oil wells. Augustus frees himself from his mother-in-law by arranging for her to marry the owner of the oil wells, Mr. Johnson.

== Cast ==
- Bryant Washburn as Augustus Billings
- Lois Wilson as Mrs. Billings
- Adele Farrington as Mrs. Batterson
- Clarence Geldart as Joseph Johnson (credited as Charles H. Geldart)
- Monte Blue as Billy Lounsberry
- Monty Banks as Leon Dathis
- Elsie Lorimer as Mrs. Dathis
- Gloria Hope as Leonora Faddish
- George Hackathorne as Henry McIntosh
- Phil Gastrock as Francis Faddish
