= Nobody's Money =

1923 film by Wallace Worsley

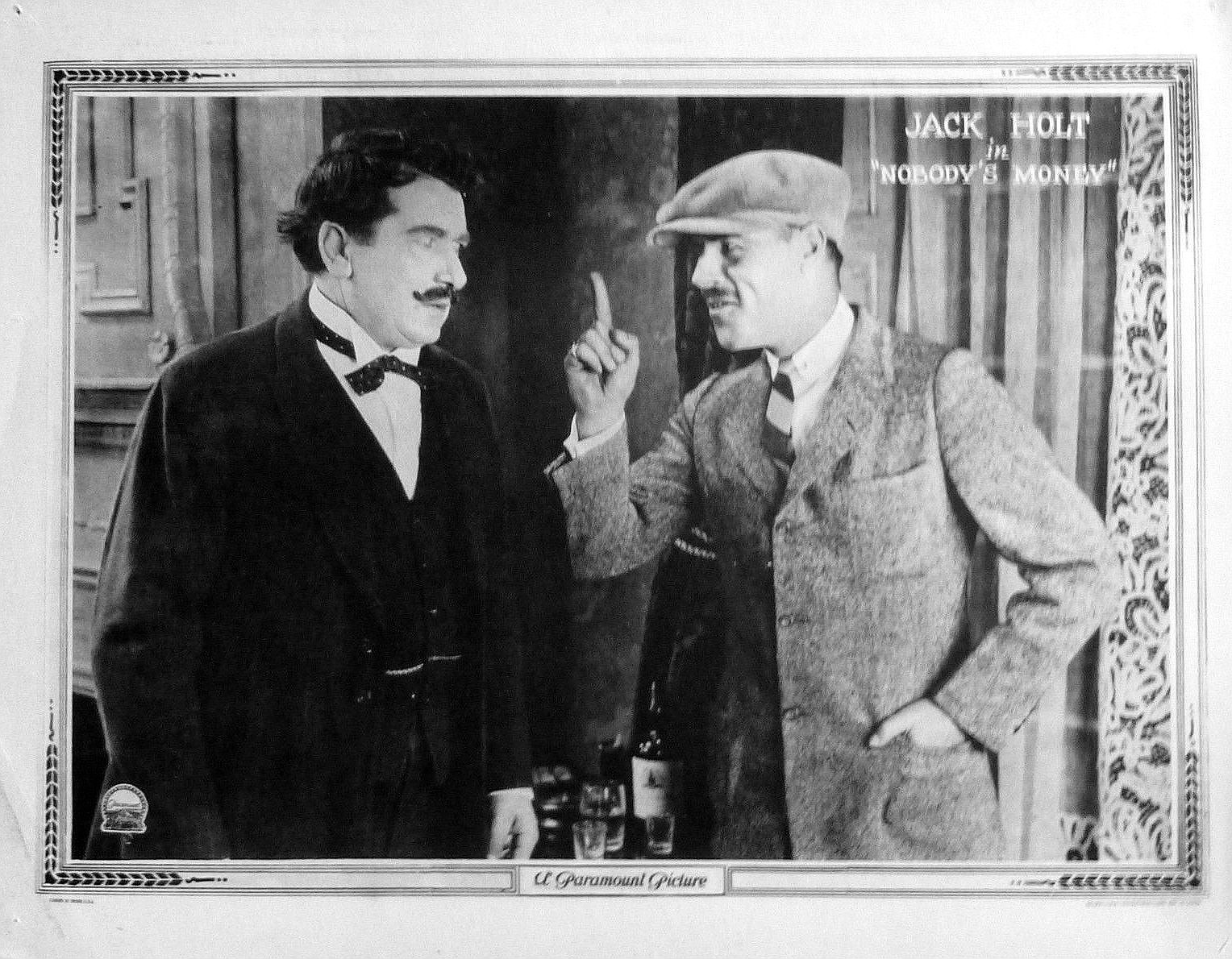
- Lobby card
- Directed by: Wallace Worsley
- Screenplay by: Beulah Marie Dix
- Based on: the play Nobody's Money by William LeBaron
- Produced by: Jesse L. Lasky
- Starring: Jack Holt; Wanda Hawley; Harry Depp; Robert Schable; Walter McGrail; Josephine Crowell; Julia Faye
- Cinematography: Charles Edgar Schoenbaum
- Production company: Famous Players–Lasky Corporation
- Distributed by: Paramount Pictures
- Release date: January 28, 1923
- Running time: 60 minutes
- Country: United States
- Language: Silent (English intertitles)

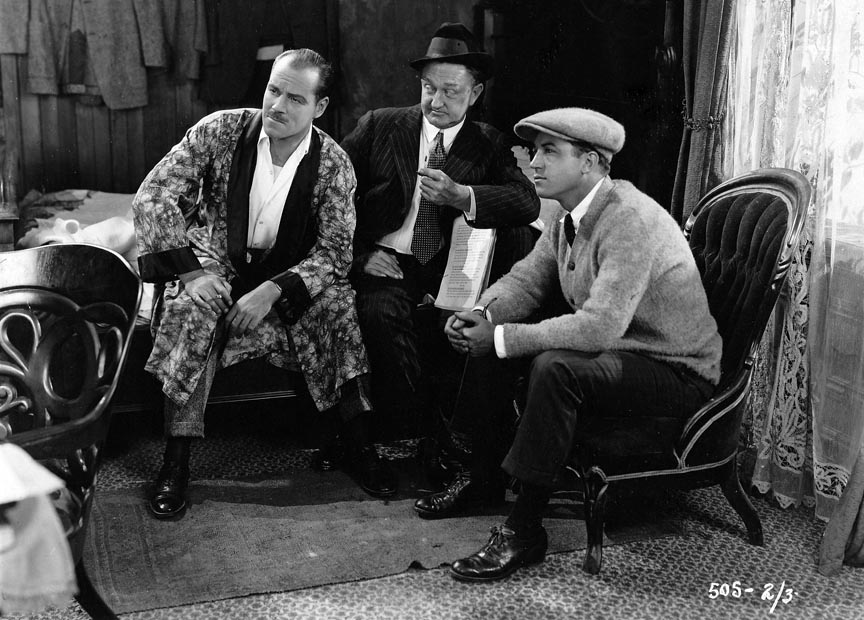
Jack Holt, Wallace Worsley (director), and cinematographer Charles Schoenbaum on the set

Nobody's Money is a lost 1923 American silent comedy film directed by Wallace Worsley and written by Beulah Marie Dix based on a play of the same name by William LeBaron. The film stars Jack Holt, Wanda Hawley, Harry Depp, Robert Schable, Walter McGrail, Josephine Crowell, and Julia Faye. The film was released on January 28, 1923, by Paramount Pictures. It is not known whether the film currently survives.

Future director Henry Hathaway worked as an assistant on this film.

== Plot ==
As described in a film magazine, the two young writers Carl Russell and Frank Carey score success with a novel titled The Breathless Bridal to which they have signed the name "Douglas Roberts." But a mistake in his income tax returns and a libel printing against State Governor Kendall starts the law looking for the supposed author. While in this trouble they meet book agent John Webster. Webster agrees to pose as Roberts and takes his safe-cracking friend Eddie Maloney along as his secretary. John meets and falls in love with the Governor's daughter, Grace, retracts the libelous article, is invited to the executive's home, and manages the Governor's reelection campaign. Annette, a maid, conspires with Briscoe, manager of a lumber company, and places some marked money in the Governor's safe, the idea being to later use it to prove that he accepted a bribe. But Eddie takes the money from the safe and gives it to John, the supposed Douglas, who has a tough time trying to replace the bills. it turns out that Annette is Eddie's long lost wife, and they agree to reunite and be respectable. Briscoe, accompanied by newspaperman Miller, enters and accuses the Governor of having marked money in his safe. Investigation proves this false. Annette accuses Briscoe of conspiracy, but after he denies it, the money found by Eddie has no owner so John pockets it. The Governor wins the election, John turns out to the owner of the lumber company who had disguised himself as a book agent to investigate his business who then weds Grace.

== Cast ==
- Jack Holt as John Webster
- Wanda Hawley as Grace Kendall
- Harry Depp as Eddie Maloney
- Robert Schable as Carl Russell
- Walter McGrail as Frank Carey
- Josephine Crowell as Mrs. Judson
- Julia Faye as Annette
- Charles Clary as Gov. Kendall
- Will Walling as Briscoe
- Clarence Burton as Kelly
- Aileen Manning as Prue Kimball
- James Neill as Miller

== Production ==
This picture initially began as a vehicle for Wallace Reid (much like A Gentleman of Leisure). Wallace Worsley directed. As Reid's morphine addiction accelerated, he could not stand for long periods of time. Some scenes were started with Reid, but he soon collapsed on set and had to be hospitalized. Reid did not live to complete any more scenes and it was the very last production Reid worked on. Jack Holt was eventually cast in the role as he had been in A Gentleman of Leisure. All of the shot Reid footage was destroyed by Paramount.
