= Crooked Streets =

1920 film by Paul Powell

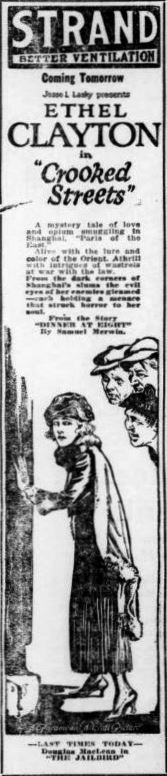
- Newspaper advertisement
- Directed by: Paul Powell; Fred J. Robinson (ass't director)
- Written by: Edith Kennedy (scenario)
- Based on: "Dinner at Eight" by Samuel Merwin
- Produced by: Adolph Zukor; Jesse L. Lasky
- Starring: Ethel Clayton; Jack Holt
- Cinematography: William Marshall
- Production company: Famous Players–Lasky
- Distributed by: Paramount Pictures
- Release date: August 8, 1920
- Running time: 5 reels; 4,750 feet
- Country: United States
- Language: Silent (English intertitles)

Crooked Streets is a 1920 American silent drama spy film directed by Paul Powell and produced by Famous Players–Lasky and distributed by Paramount Pictures. It is one of star Ethel Clayton's rare surviving silent films with a copy at the Library of Congress. The film is based on a short story, "Dinner at Eight", by Samuel Merwin.

== Plot ==
As described in a film magazine, Gail Ellis is employed as a secretary by Professor Lawrence Griswold prior to his departure from San Francisco for Shanghai, ostensibly in that city to purchase some rare vases. In the city she meets with adventures while trying to find the headquarters of the pottery merchants and is saved from molestation by Englishman Rupert O'Dare, who has to battle a drunken sailor in a boxing ring before the latter will leave her alone. As the Griswolds are about to depart for America, having purchased several cases of vases that contain opium, Rupert causes them to be arrested. They overpower him and are about to escape when Gail arrives with officers and apprehends them. Rupert then confesses that he is a member of the British secret service and Gail says that she is Ellis of the U.S. Secret Service, and that Rupert had forced her hand as she had intended to arrest the Griswolds in San Francisco. They find happiness in each other's company, and later sail to England as Mr. and Mrs. O'Dare.

== Cast ==
- Ethel Clayton as Gail Ellis
- Jack Holt as Rupert O'Dare
- Clyde Fillmore as Lawrence Griswold (*Clyde Fillmore)
- Clarence Geldart as Silas Griswold
- Josephine Crowell as Mrs. Griswold
- Fred Starr as Sailor Hugh
