= Born to the West (1926 film) =

1926 film

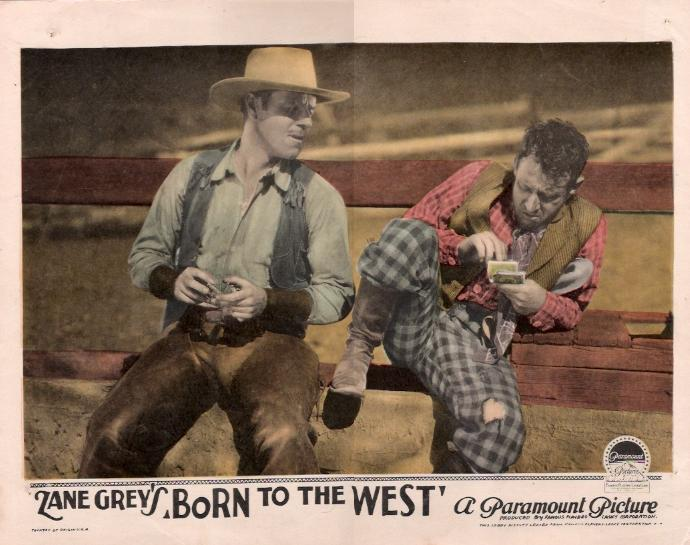
- Film poster
- Directed by: John Waters
- Written by: Zane Grey; Lucien Hubbard
- Produced by: Jesse L. Lasky; Adolph Zukor
- Starring: Jack Holt; Margaret Morris; Raymond Hatton; Arlette Marchal; George Siegmann; Bruce Gordon; William A. Carroll
- Cinematography: Charles Edgar Schoenbaum
- Production company: Famous Players–Lasky Corporation
- Distributed by: Paramount Pictures
- Release date: June 14, 1926
- Running time: 66 minutes
- Country: United States
- Language: Silent (English intertitles)

Born to the West is a 1926 American silent adventure film directed by John Waters and written by Zane Grey and Lucien Hubbard. The film stars Jack Holt, Margaret Morris, Raymond Hatton, Arlette Marchal, George Siegmann, Bruce Gordon, and William A. Carroll. The film was released on June 14, 1926, by Paramount Pictures.

== Plot ==
As described in a film magazine, Kentucky schoolboys Dare Rudd and Bate Fillmore fight over Nell Worstall, and when the conflict ends both boys bear scars for life. Years later, after Dare moves to Colorado, they meet and again fight. The Dare loves his schoolgirl sweetheart Nell dearly, and learns that her father is in jail on a trumped up charge made by his rival, and that Nell has consented to marry Bate to save her father. The rival with his gang tries to get rid of this man, who is saved by his pal. After several exciting incidents in which the young woman is forced to marry the rival, Belle, a dancing girl at the Paradise Bar, knifes Bate after he strikes her, and Nell escapes. The fight between the miner's and their rivals then ensues and the feud between the two rivals is ended in an interesting manner.

== Cast ==
- Jack Holt as 'Colorado' Dare Rudd
- Margaret Morris as Nell Worstall
- Raymond Hatton as Jim Fallon
- Arlette Marchal as Belle of Paradise Bar
- George Siegmann as Jesse Fillmore
- Bruce Gordon as Bate Fillmore
- William A. Carroll as Nell's Father
- Tom Kennedy as Dinkey Hooley
- Richard Neill as Sheriff Haverill
- Edith Yorke as Mrs. Rudd
- E. Alyn Warren as Sam Rudd
- Billy Aber as 'Colorado' Dare Rudd, as a child
- Jean Johnston as Nell Worstall, as a child
- Joe Butterworth as Bate Fillmore, as a child

== Preservation ==
With no prints of Born to the West located in any film archives, it is a lost film.
