= On the High Seas =

1922 film by Irvin Willat

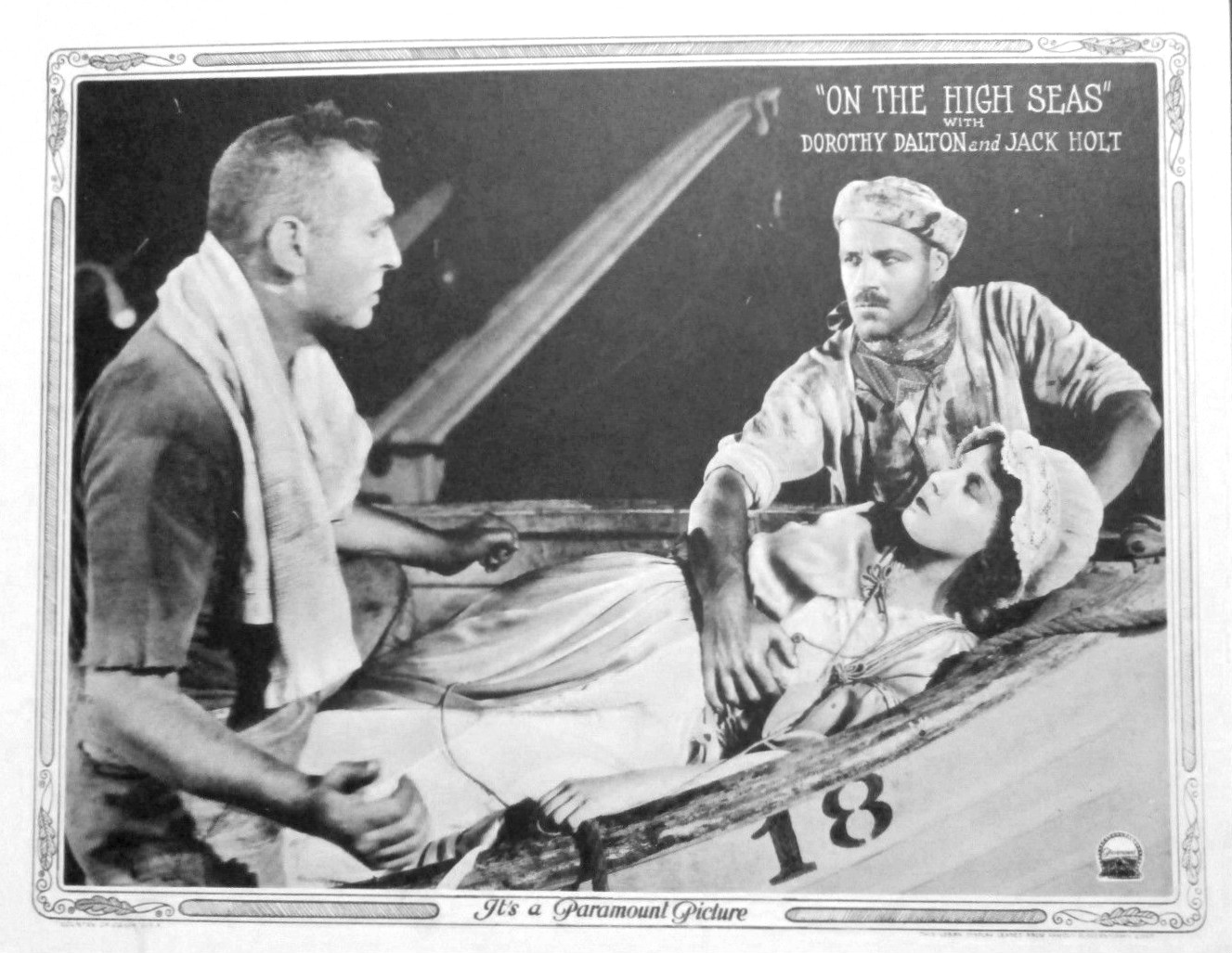
- Lobby card
- Directed by: Irvin Willat
- Screenplay by: Edward Sheldon; E. Magnus Ingleton
- Produced by: Irvin Willat; Adolph Zukor
- Starring: Dorothy Dalton; Jack Holt; Mitchell Lewis; Winter Hall; Michael Dark; Otto Brower; William Boyd
- Cinematography: Charles Edgar Schoenbaum
- Production company: Irvin V. Willat Productions
- Distributed by: Paramount Pictures
- Release date: September 17, 1922
- Running time: 60 minutes
- Country: United States
- Language: Silent (English intertitles)

On the High Seas is a 1922 American silent adventure film directed by Irvin Willat and written by Edward Sheldon and E. Magnus Ingleton. The film stars Dorothy Dalton, Jack Holt, Mitchell Lewis, Winter Hall, Michael Dark, Otto Brower, and William Boyd. The film was released on September 17, 1922, by Paramount Pictures.

== Plot ==
As described in a film magazine review, while returning from East Asia, the ship S.S. Andren catches fire. Leone Deveraux is rescued by stokers Jim Dorn and Joe Polack, and the three cast off in a small boat. After three days, they sight a plague ship derelict, throw the corpses overboard, and make themselves at home. Joe desires Leone and one night during a storm attacks her, but she is rescued by Jim with whom she has fallen in love. Joe is then killed by a falling mast. The two lovers are rescued by a battleship and taken home. Leone, who is engaged to be married, loses trace of Jim until, on a day when she is on the way to the church, she is abducted by a masked man who turns out to be Jim. When it is revealed that Jim is actually a man of position and wealth, the two begin a happy relationship.

== Cast ==
- Dorothy Dalton as Leone Deveraux
- Jack Holt as Jim Dorn
- Mitchell Lewis as Joe Polack
- Winter Hall as John Deveraux
- Michael Dark as Harold Van Allen
- Otto Brower as Lt. Gray, USN
- William Boyd as Dick Deveraux
- James Gordon as Captain of S.S. Andren
- Alice Knowland as Aunt Emily
- Vernon Tremaine as Maid

== Preservation ==
With no prints of On the High Seas located in any film archives, it is a lost film.
