= The Vanishing Pioneer =

1928 film

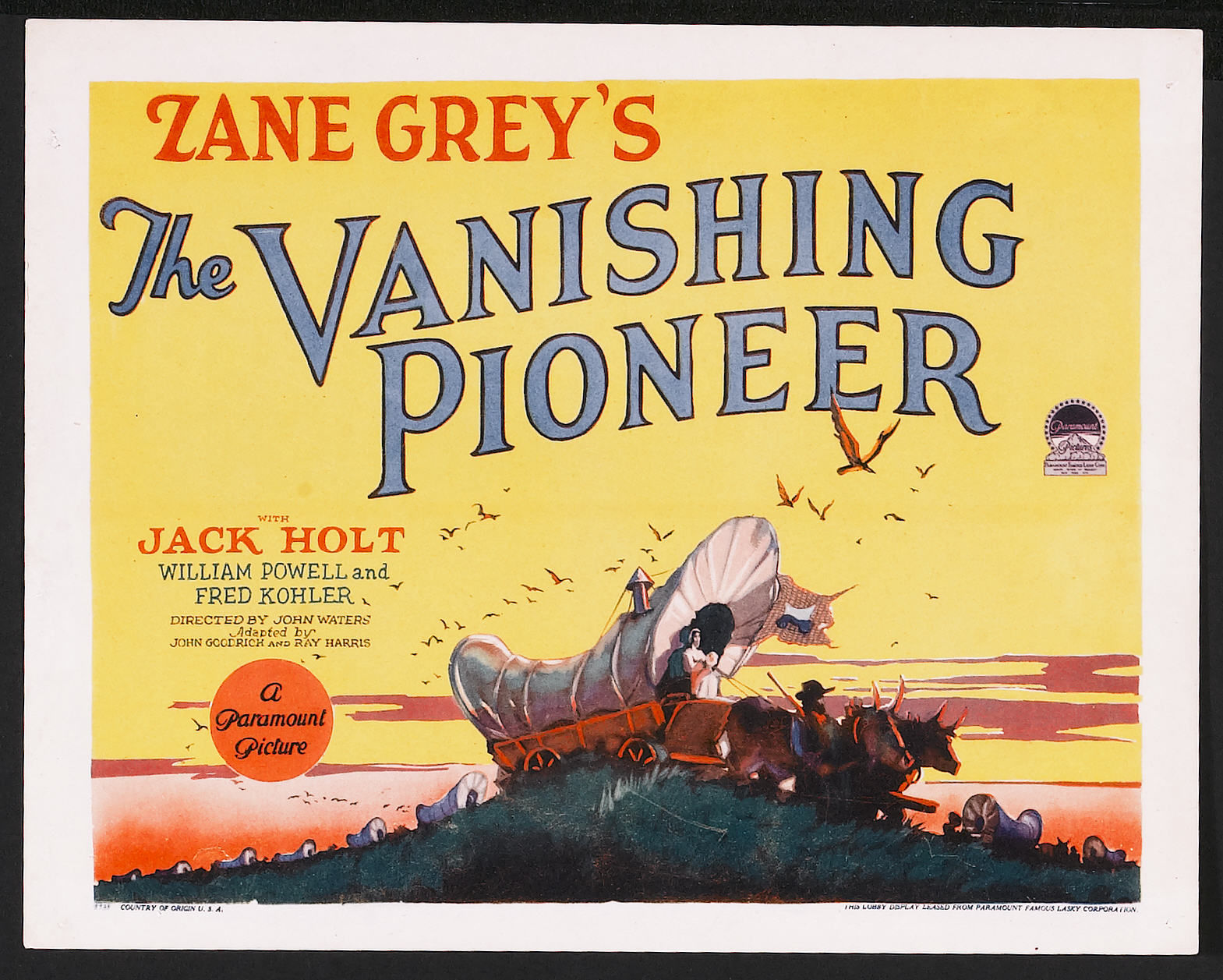
- Directed by: John Waters
- Written by: J. Walter Ruben; John F. Goodrich; Ray Harris; Julian Johnson
- Based on: Golden Dreams by Zane Grey
- Starring: Jack Holt; Sally Blane; William Powell
- Cinematography: Charles Schoenbaum
- Edited by: Doris Drought
- Production company: Paramount Pictures
- Distributed by: Paramount Pictures
- Release date: June 23, 1928
- Running time: 60 minutes
- Country: United States
- Languages: Silent; English intertitles

The Vanishing Pioneer is a 1928 American silent Western film directed by John Waters and starring Jack Holt, Sally Blane and William Powell. Holt's son, Tim makes his screen debut in this film The film is now lost. It is based on a story by Zane Grey. Parts of the film were shot in Zion National Park and Springdale, Utah.

== Plot ==
A settlement of descendants of historical pioneers is threatened when their water supply is cut off by the large town that is growing nearby. The settlers are led by a rancher who battles back against the corrupt political leadership of the townspeople.

== Cast ==
- Jack Holt as Anthony Ballard/John Ballard
- Sally Blane as June Shelby
- William Powell as John Murdock
- Fred Kohler as Sheriff Murdock
- Guy Oliver as Mr. Shelby
- Roscoe Karns as Ray Hearn
- Tim Holt as John Ballard, age 7
- Marcia Manon as The Apron Woman

== External list ==
- The Vanishing Pioneer at IMDb
- The Vanishing Pioneers at Silent Era Film
