= Man of the Forest (1926 film) =

1926 film

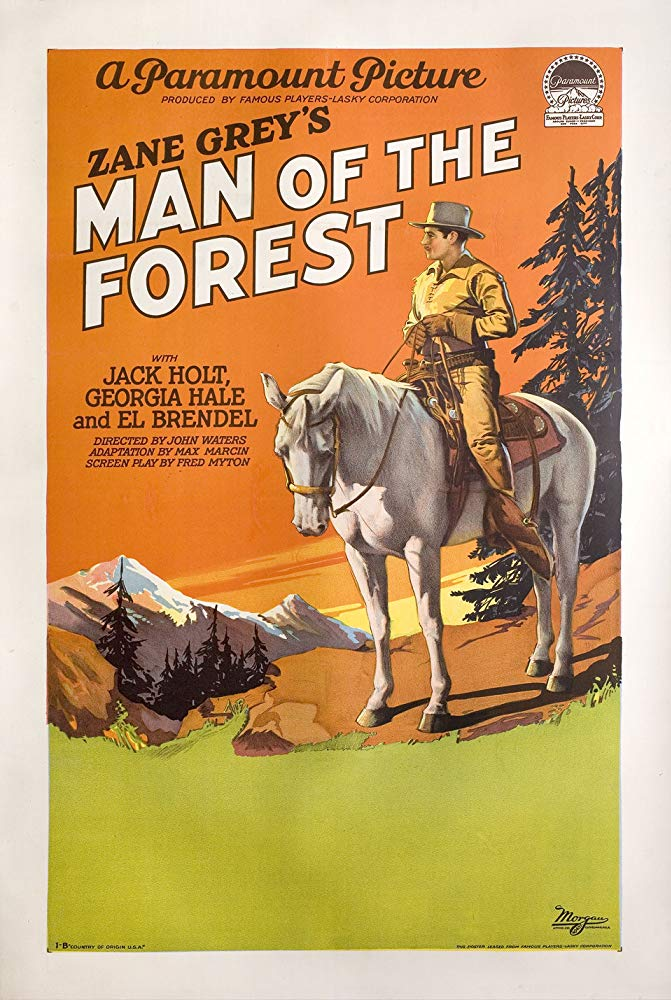
- Directed by: John Waters
- Screenplay by: Zane Grey; Max Marcin; Fred Myton
- Produced by: Jesse L. Lasky; Adolph Zukor
- Starring: Jack Holt; Georgia Hale; El Brendel; Warner Oland; Tom Kennedy; George Fawcett; Ivan Christy
- Cinematography: Charles Edgar Schoenbaum
- Production company: Famous Players–Lasky Corporation
- Distributed by: Paramount Pictures
- Release date: December 27, 1926
- Running time: 65 minutes
- Country: United States
- Languages: Silent; English intertitles

Man of the Forest is a 1926 American silent Western film directed by John Waters and written by Zane Grey, Max Marcin and Fred Myton. The film stars Jack Holt, Georgia Hale, El Brendel, Warner Oland, Tom Kennedy, George Fawcett and Ivan Christy. The film was released on December 27, 1926, by Paramount Pictures.

Henry Hathaway directed a remake in 1933 starring Randolph Scott, with Scott darkening his hair and wearing a moustache to match stock footage of Holt playing the part. Noah Beery Sr. portrayed Warner Oland's part as Clint Beasley in the remake while Tom Kennedy reprised his role as the Sheriff.

== Cast ==
- Jack Holt as Milt Dale
- Georgia Hale as Nancy Raynor
- El Brendel as Horace Pipp
- Warner Oland as Clint Beasley
- Tom Kennedy as Sheriff
- George Fawcett as Nancy's Uncle
- Ivan Christy as Snake Anson
- Bruce Gordon as Jim Wilson
- Vester Pegg as Moses
- Willard Cooley as Deputy Sheriff
- Guy Oliver as First Deputy
- Walter Ackerman as Second Deputy
- Duke R. Lee as Martin Mulvery

== Preservation ==
With no holdings located in archives, The Man of the Forest is considered a lost film.
