= Rent Free =

1922 film by Howard Higgin

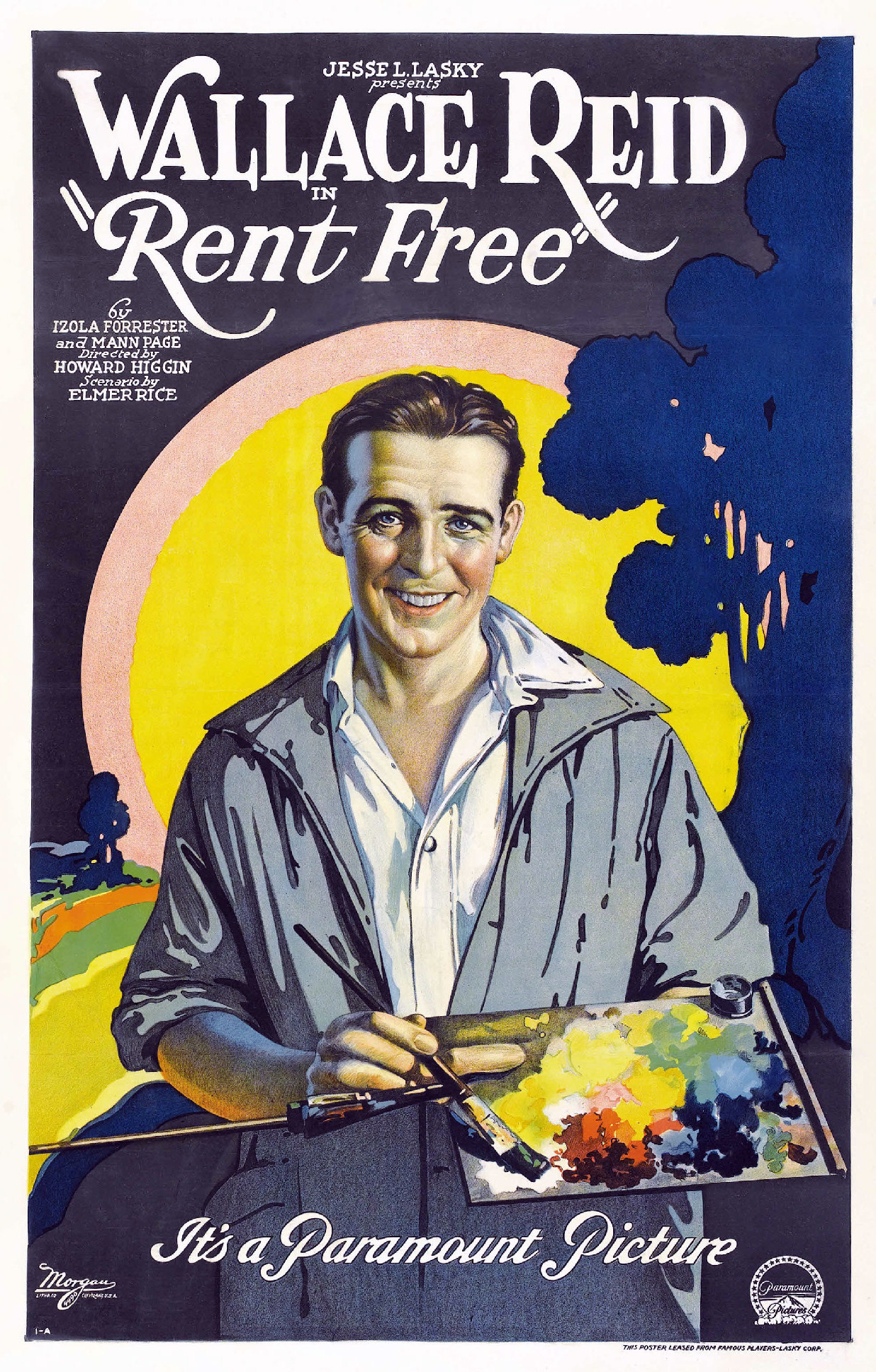
- Theatrical poster
- Directed by: Howard Higgin
- Written by: Elmer Rice (scenario)
- Story by: Izola Forrester; Mann Page
- Produced by: Adolph Zukor; Jesse Lasky; Thomas Buchanan
- Starring: Wallace Reid; Lila Lee
- Cinematography: Charles E. Schoenbaum
- Distributed by: Paramount Pictures
- Release date: January 1, 1922
- Running time: 5 reels; (4,661 feet)
- Country: United States
- Language: Silent (English intertitles)

Rent Free is a 1922 American silent comedy feature film produced by Famous Players–Lasky and distributed through Paramount Pictures. The film starred Wallace Reid and his current regular co-star Lila Lee. It was directed by Howard Higgin and adapted by Elmer Rice from a story written directly for the screen by Izola Forrester and Mann Page. Currently this film is lost.

Reid plays the part of a young painter who moves into an abandoned house but is discovered by the daughter of its former owner. In real life Reid was a talented painter.

This was Higgin's first film as a director.

== Plot ==
As described in a film magazine, Buell Arnister Jr. is a New York City artist cast off by his father Buell Arnister Sr. who had planned a legal career for him. Facing poverty and dispossessed by an irate landlady, he moves his belongings including his dog to the roof of a 68th Street apartment building, and then becomes a squatter in a mansion that had a door to its roof left open. On a nearby roof he sees two young women, Barbara Teller and her friend Justine Tate, who similarly have been dispossessed. When a storm collapses the tent that the women were living in, the artist rescues them and takes them to the mansion, where they also become squatters. It develops that the mansion had been the property of Barbara's father. The stepmother has married the foreign Count de Mourney and they return home to discover the squatters, resulting in a series of funny conglomerations. The troubles are settled after finding a letter and will from the deceased father which take care of Barbara in a proper financial manner and everything is resolved in a happy ending, even for the disdainful stepmother.

== Cast ==
- Wallace Reid as Buell Arnister Jr.
- Lila Lee as Barbara Teller
- Henry A. Barrows as Buell Arnister Sr.
- Gertrude Short as Justine Tate
- Lucien Littlefield as 'Batty' Briggs
- Lillian Leighton as Maria Tebbs
- Claire McDowell as Countess de Mourney
- Clarence Geldart as Count de Mourney
- Pal the Dog

== Production ==
Filming for Rent Free began in mid-August 1921, and wrapped up by mid-September 1921. For the rooftop scenes, the tops of studio buildings were used as the sets.

== See also ==
- Wallace Reid filmography
