= Doris Drought =

American film editor

- Born: September 10, 1899; Kansas City, Kansas, USA
- Died: March 18, 1976 (aged 76); Pacific Palisades, California, USA
- Education: University of Kansas
- Occupation: Film editor

Doris Drought was an American film editor and script supervisor known for her work at Paramount during the 1920s and 1930s.

== Biography ==
Doris was born to Philip Drought and Margaret Bigger in Kansas City, Kansas, in 1899. An only child, she attended the University of Kansas, graduating in 1920. She married her college classmate, Byron Shutz, that same year, but they seem to have parted ways soon after.

By 1924, she was living and working in Hollywood. She began working as an editor for Paramount, amassing over a dozen credits between 1928 and 1934. Director Francis D. Lyon trained under Drought, who was one of four or five female editors at the studio at the time.

Little is known as to what happened to her after retiring from the industry.

== Selected filmography ==
- Reunion (1936) (script editor)
- Crimson Romance (1934)
- The Crosby Case (1934)
- Bombay Mail (1934)
- The Silver Lining (1932)
- Honeymoon Lane (1931)
- Everything's Rosie (1931)
- Sea Legs (1930)
- Her Wedding Night (1930)
- The Border Legion (1930)
- True to the Navy (1930)
- The Benson Murder Case (1930)
- Only the Brave (1930)
- Behind the Make-Up (1930)
- What a Night! (1928)
- Manhattan Cocktail (1928)
- The Vanishing Pioneer (1928)
- Red Hair (1928)
