= Held by the Enemy (film) =

1920 film by Donald Crisp

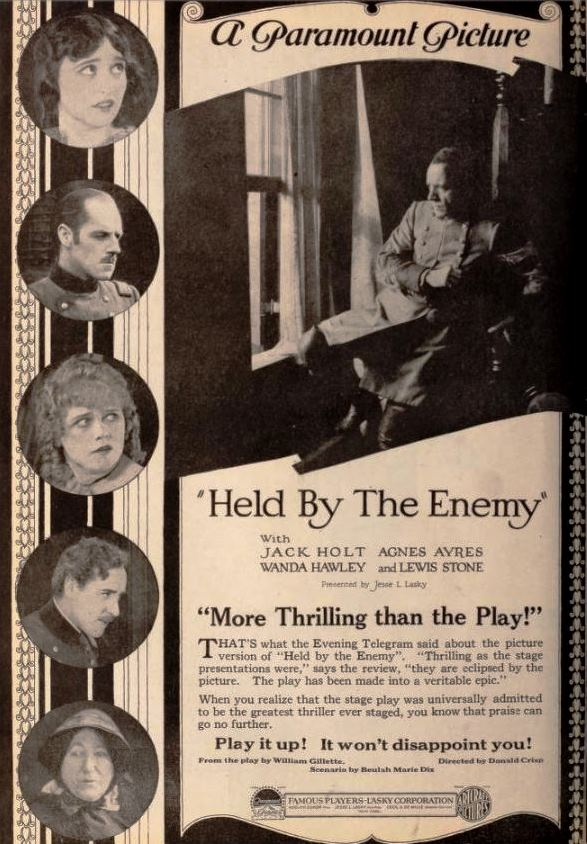
- Advertisement
- Directed by: Donald Crisp; Wilton Welch
- Written by: Beulah Marie Dix
- Based on: Held by the Enemy by William Gillette
- Produced by: Adolph Zukor; Jesse Lasky
- Starring: Agnes Ayres; Lewis Stone
- Cinematography: C. Edgar Schoenbaum
- Distributed by: Paramount Pictures
- Release date: October 24, 1920
- Running time: 6 reels
- Country: United States
- Language: Silent (English intertitles)

Held by the Enemy is a lost 1920 American silent Civil War melodrama film directed by Donald Crisp and based on the 1886 play by William Gillette. The film starred Agnes Ayres, Lewis Stone, and Jack Holt. It was produced by Famous Players–Lasky and distributed by Paramount Pictures.

Lobby card

== Plot ==
As described in a film magazine, Rachel Hayne, whose husband, a Southern soldier, is believed to have died in battle, renews a former love affair with Union fighter Colonel Charles Prescott. She also cultivates the friendship of another Northerner, Brigade Surgeon Fielding, for the purpose of obtaining quinine from him to pass on to Southern soldiers. Prescott is about to avow his love when the husband Captain Gordon Haine returns. When Hayne is recaptured as a spy, Fielding accuses Prescott of trumping up the charge to dispose of the husband. Hayne escapes from his imprisonment, but is then recaptured, and after several incidents commits suicide. This leaves the love road free for his former wife, who never loved him, and the man to whom she has given her heart.

== Cast ==
- Agnes Ayres as Rachel Hayne
- Wanda Hawley as Emmy McCreery
- Josephine Crowell as Sarah Hayne
- Lillian Leighton as Clarissa
- Lewis Stone as Captain Gordon Haine
- Jack Holt as Colonel Charles Prescott
- Robert Cain as Brigade Surgeon Fielding
- Walter Hiers as Thomas Beene
- Robert Brower as Uncle Rufus
- Clarence Geldart as Major General Stanton
- Byron Douglas

== See also ==
- List of films and television shows about the American Civil War
