= The Hell Diggers =

1921 film

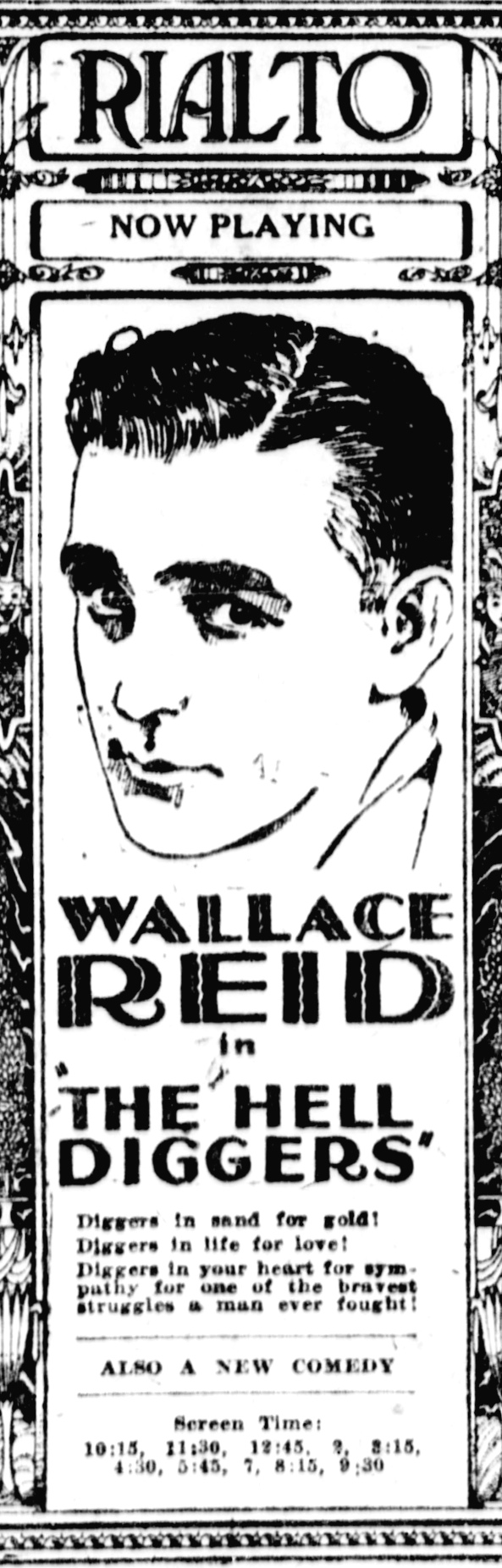
- Advertisement for the film.
- Directed by: Frank Urson
- Written by: Byron Morgan (short story, scenario)
- Produced by: Adolph Zukor; Jesse Lasky
- Starring: Wallace Reid; Lois Wilson
- Cinematography: Charles Schoenbaum
- Distributed by: Paramount Pictures
- Release date: September 4, 1921
- Running time: 5 reels; 4,277 feet
- Country: United States
- Language: Silent (English intertitles)

The Hell Diggers is a 1921 American silent drama film produced by Famous Players–Lasky and distributed through Paramount Pictures. The film was directed by Frank Urson from a short story, The Hell Diggers, by Byron Morgan. Wallace Reid and Lois Wilson star.

== Plot ==
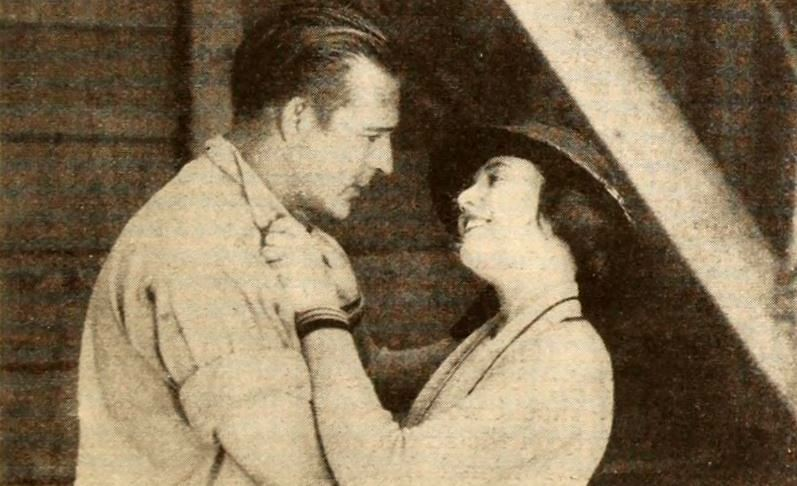
Wallace Reid as engineer Teddy Darman and Lois Wilson as the landowner's daughter, Dora Wade.

Teddy Darman is an engineer for a gold dredging company. Local farmers complain that his "hell diggers" (so named because they destroy land with huge, heavy equipment) are ruining their fields.

== Cast ==
- Wallace Reid as Teddy Darman
- Lois Wilson as Dora Wade
- Alexander Brown as John Wade
- Frank Geldert as Calthorpe Masters (*some sources Frank Leigh)
- Lucien Littlefield as Silas Hoskins
- Clarence Geldart as Silverby Rennie
- Buddy Post as The Fat Farmer

== Reception ==
=== Critical response ===
Although reviews were mixed to poor, Motion Picture News Booking Guide noted that it "illustrates how gold is mined in California by dredges and shows the star as an inventive engineer who builds a dredge that would resoil the land. Romance develops between the engineer and one of the local landowner's daughters." The guide called it "A melodrama with comedy touches." A reviewer for Life magazine lamented, "The lumbering dredge which plays the principal rôle is unusual enough to be interesting to those of a mechanical turn of mind—but the lumbering story is not."

A reader of Film Fun noted a problem with continuity: "In Wallie Reid's picture, 'The Hell Diggers,' Wallie goes to the home of the farmer to show his plans, there is a fire burning in the fireplace. When Wallie leaves, Lois Wilson goes to the door with him, only half of the fireplace is to be seen, but there is no fire. Did the draft from the open door blow it out?"

== Preservation ==
It is unknown whether the film survives as no copies have been located, likely lost.
