= Chief John Big Tree =

American actor (1877–1967)

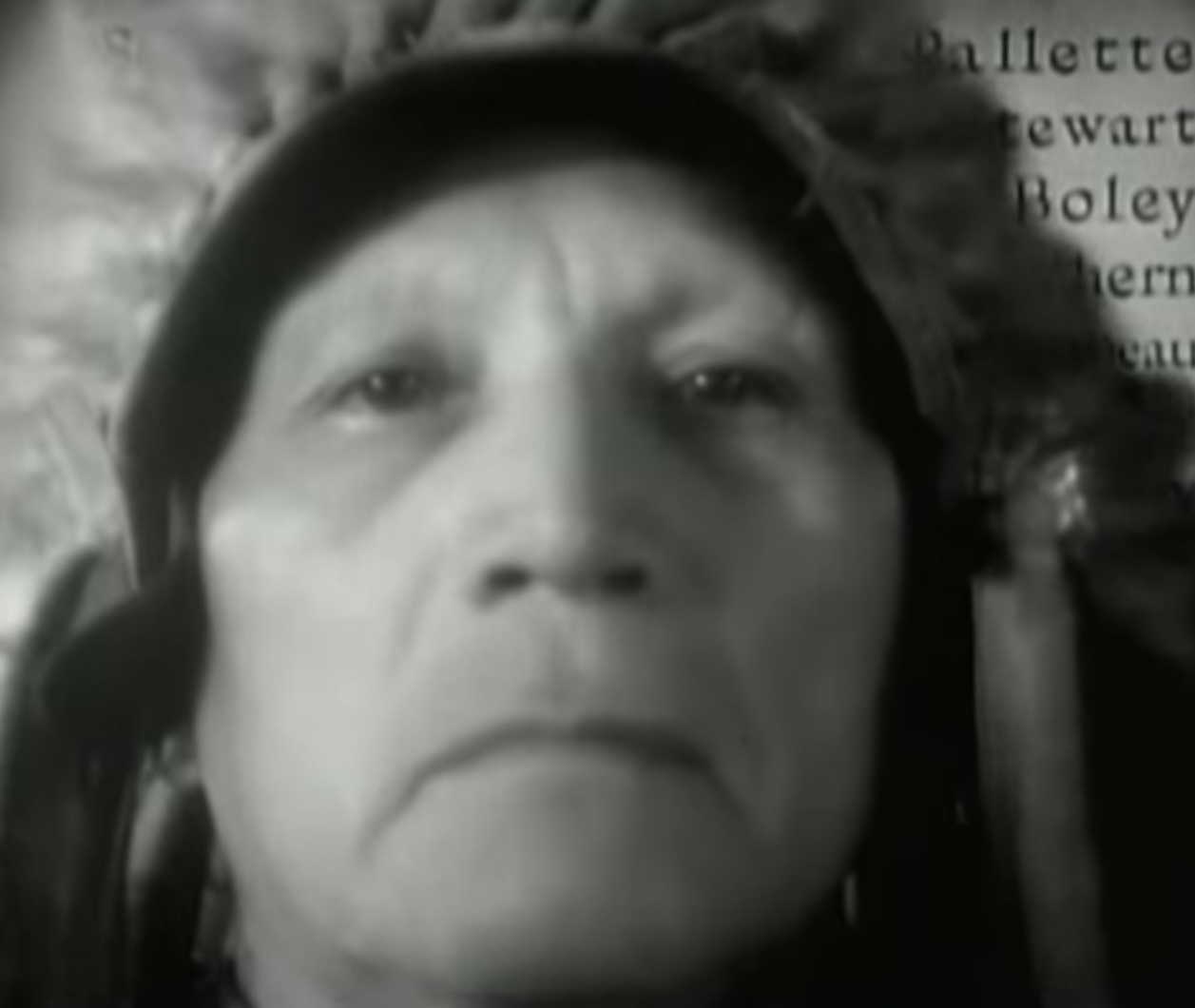
- Big Tree in Fighting Caravans (1931)
- Born: Isaac Johnny John; June 2, 1877; Buffalo, New York, U.S.
- Died: July 6, 1967 (aged 90); Onondaga Indian Reservation, New York, U.S.
- Occupation: Actor
- Years active: 1915–1950

Chief John Big Tree (born Isaac Johnny John; June 2, 1877 – July 6, 1967) was a Seneca actor who appeared in at least 60 films between 1915 and 1950. He was born in Buffalo, New York, and died in Onondaga Indian Reservation, New York. His interment was also there.

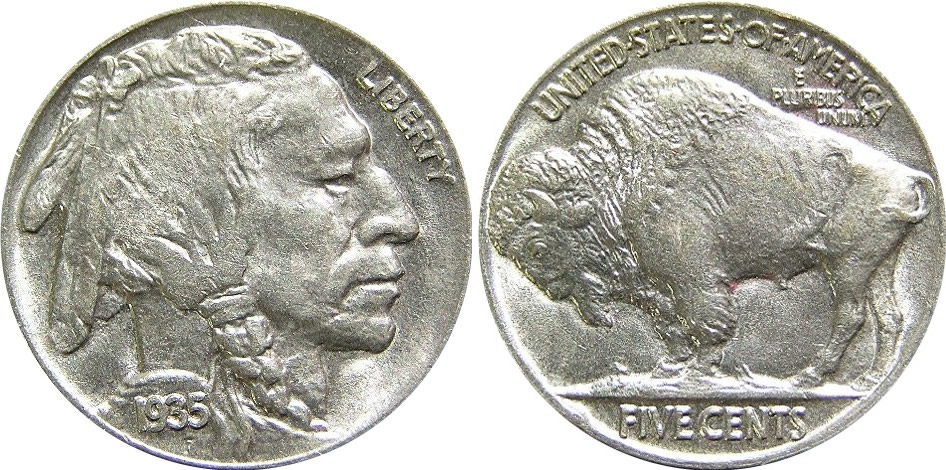
U.S. Indian Head nickel, for which Big Tree claimed he was one of three models

Big Tree claimed to be one of three Native American chiefs whose profiles were composited to make the portrait featured on the obverse of the United States' Indian Head nickel, designed by sculptor James Earle Fraser. The other two chiefs were Iron Tail and Two Moons. Though Big Tree claimed that his profile was used to create that portion of the portrait from the top of the forehead to the upper lip, the sculptor himself stated in 1938 that it was another Big Tree (a Kiowa also known as Adoeette), who was the third.

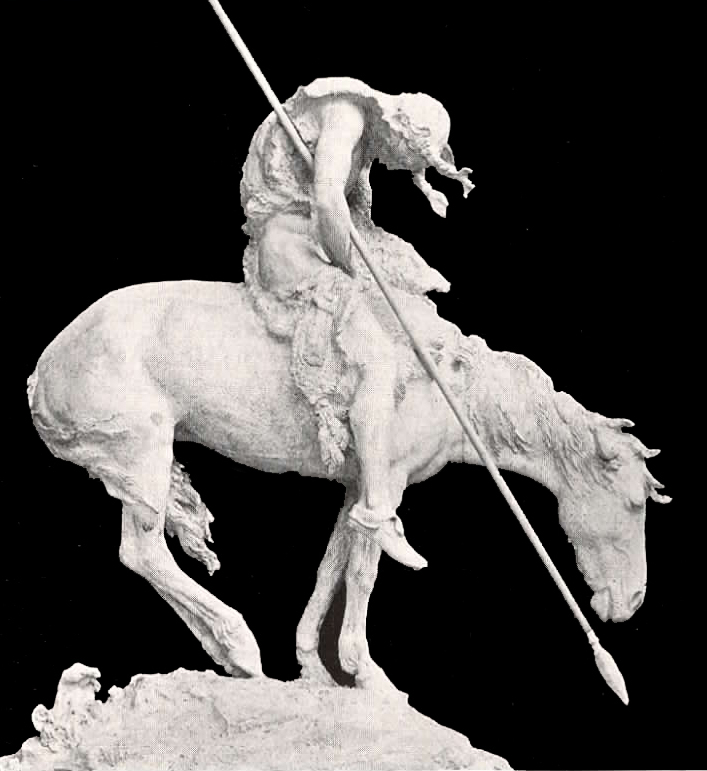
James Earle Fraser's sculpture, End of the Trail, for which Big Tree claimed he was the model

Big Tree also claimed to be the sole model for Fraser's most recognized work, the doleful sculpture, End of the Trail. Both of these claims are broadly disputed, and Fraser identified other models.

He also appeared on the March 1964 cover of Esquire magazine, in a pose commemorating the Indian Head nickel.

== As actor ==
John Big Tree was a longtime Hollywood actor, who appeared in at least 60 pictures between 1915 and 1950.

Often uncredited, he had a noted speaking role in his second to last picture, the middle of John Ford's celebrated "Cavalry Trilogy", She Wore a Yellow Ribbon (1949). As Chief Pony That Walks he has an extended dialogue with his old friend, Cavalry captain Nathan Brittles (played by John Wayne), who seeks the aged chief's help in quelling a rebellion among his people spurred by the Sioux victory over General George Armstrong Custer at the Battle of the Little Bighorn.

== Partial filmography ==
- The Spirit of '76 (1917, Lost film) as Gowah
- A Fight for Love (1919, Lost film) as Swift Deer
- The Avenging Arrow (1921, Lost film) as Madoo
- The Primitive Lover (1922) as Chief Johnny Bluebottle
- The Huntress (1923) as Otebaya
- The Iron Horse (1924) as Cheyenne Chief (uncredited)
- The Red Rider (1925) as Indian Chief
- Ranson's Folly (1926) as Chief Standing Bear
- The Frontier Trail (1926) as Chief Gray Wolf
- Mantrap (1926) as Indian (uncredited)
- The Desert's Toll (1926) as Red Eagle
- The Outlaw Breaker (1926) as Indian (uncredited)
- Winners of the Wilderness (1927) as Chief Pontiac
- The Frontiersman (1927) as Grey Eagle
- Painted Ponies (1927)
- Spoilers of the West (1927) as Chief Red Cloud
- Wyoming (1928) as An Indian
- The Overland Telegraph (1929) as Medicine Man
- Sioux Blood (1929) as Crazy Wolf
- The Big Trail (1930) as Indian (uncredited)
- Red Fork Range (1931) as Chief Barking Fox
- Fighting Caravans (1931) as Indian Chief in Opening Credits (uncredited)
- The Last of the Mohicans (1932, Serial) as Huron Warrior (uncredited)
- The Golden West (1932) as Indian (uncredited)
- The Telegraph Trail (1933) as Indian Chief (uncredited)
- King of the Arena (1933) as Circus Indian (uncredited)
- Massacre (1934) as Indian Judge (uncredited)
- Wheels of Destiny (1934) as Chief War Eagle
- The Cat's-Paw (1934) as Chinese Guards (uncredited)
- Wake Up and Dream (1934) as 1st Indian (uncredited)
- The Miracle Rider (1935, Serial) as Old Indian [Ch. 1] (uncredited)
- The Farmer Takes a Wife (1935) as Indian (uncredited)
- The Singing Vagabond (1935) as Chief White Eagle (uncredited)
- Custer's Last Stand (1936, Serial) as Medicine Man [Ch. 9]
- The Adventures of Frank Merriwell (1936, Serial) as Indian John (uncredited)
- Daniel Boone (1936) as Wyandotte Warrior (uncredited)
- The Bold Caballero (1936) as Tavern Indian (uncredited)
- Maid of Salem (1937) as Indian (uncredited)
- Lost Horizon (1937) as Porter (uncredited)
- Hills of Old Wyoming (1937) (with Hopalong Cassidy) as Chief Big Tree
- The Painted Stallion (1937, Serial) as Commanche Chief (uncredited)
- Prairie Thunder (1937) as Indian (uncredited)
- The Girl of the Golden West (1938) as Indian Chief in Prologue (uncredited)
- Flaming Frontiers (1938, Serial) as Arapaho Chief [Chs. 12–13] (uncredited)
- Hawk of the Wilderness (1938, Serial) as Medicine Man (uncredited)
- Stagecoach (1939) as Apache Scout (uncredited)
- Susannah of the Mounties (1939) as Chief (uncredited)
- The Oregon Trail (1939, Serial) as Spotted Elk (uncredited)
- Drums Along the Mohawk (1939) as Blue Back
- Destry Rides Again (1939) as Indian in Saloon (uncredited)
- Heroes of the Saddle (1940) as Rodeo Indian (uncredited)
- Pioneers of the West (1940) as Indian Chief (uncredited)
- Brigham Young (1940) as Big Elk
- Too Many Girls (1940) as Chief (uncredited)
- North West Mounted Police (1940) as Blue Owl (uncredited)
- Hudson's Bay (1941) as Chief
- Western Union (1941) as Chief Spotted Horse
- Las Vegas Nights (1941) as Indian (uncredited)
- Unconquered (1947) as Indian (uncredited)
- She Wore a Yellow Ribbon (1949) as Chief Pony That Walks
- Devil's Doorway (1950) as Thundercloud
