= The Sins of Rosanne =

1920 film by Tom Forman

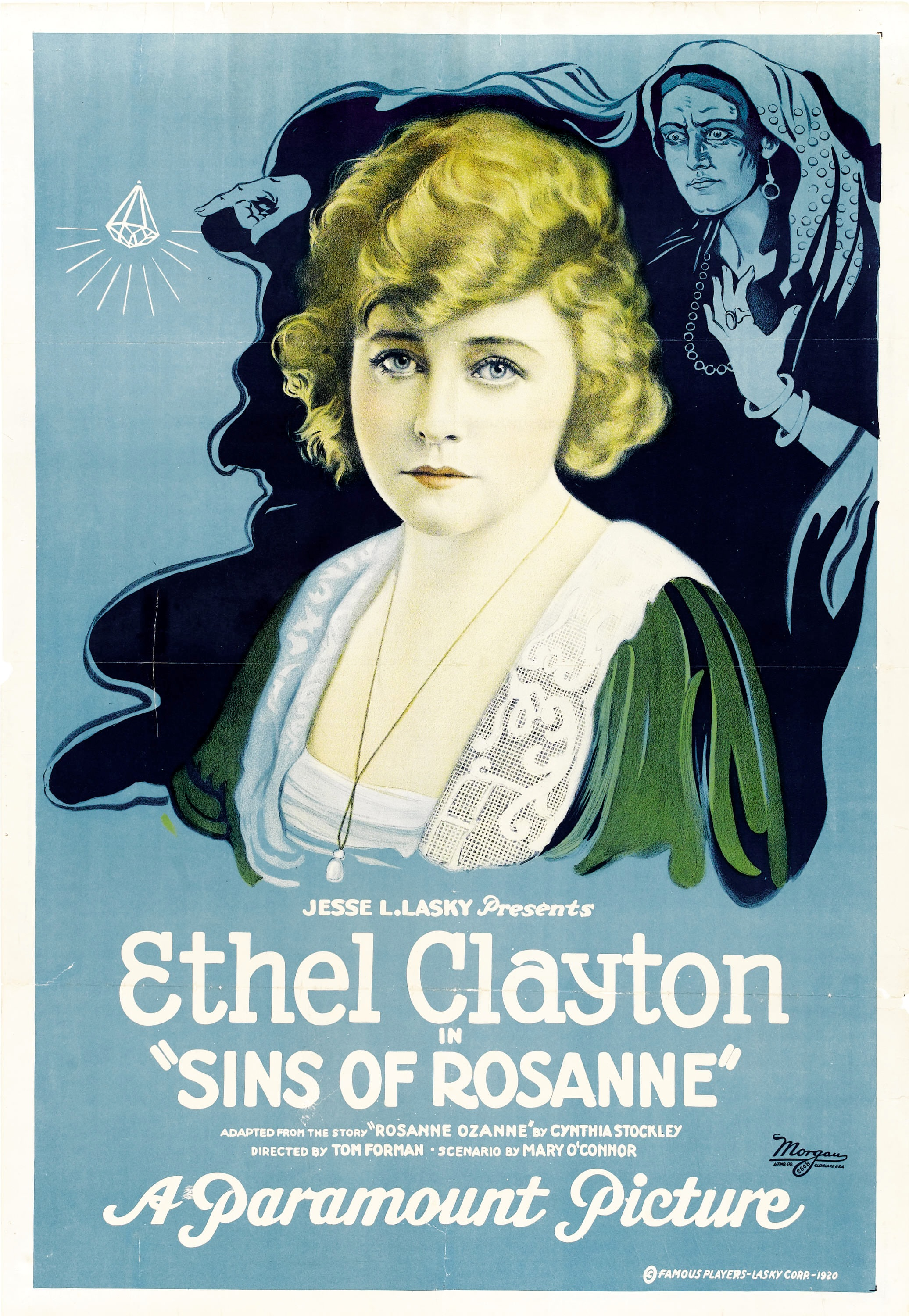
- Theatrical poster
- Directed by: Tom Forman
- Written by: Cynthia Stockley (screen story: Rosanne Ozanne); Mary H. O'Connor
- Produced by: Adolph Zukor; Jesse Lasky
- Cinematography: Alfred Gilks; Harry Perry
- Distributed by: Paramount Pictures
- Release date: November 7, 1920
- Running time: 5 reels
- Country: United States
- Language: Silent (English intertitles)

The Sins of Rosanne is a surviving 1920 American silent drama film starring Ethel Clayton and directed by actor/director Tom Forman. The Famous Players–Lasky studio produced the film with release by Paramount Pictures.

The film is preserved in the Library of Congress, but is incomplete and missing reels 1 and 3.

== Plot ==
As described in a film magazine, when physicians despair of the life of little Rosanne Ozanne, infant daughter of the Kimberly widow Mrs. Ozanne, Rachel Bangat, a Malay servant credited with mystic powers, offers to save the child's life on the condition that the child is sold to her for two years for a farthing. The distracted mother, living in the Kimberly mining country of South Africa, agrees. At the end of the two years the child is returned with the information that two gifts have been given her by the Malay servant, one a passion for bright stones, especially diamonds, and the other the art of hating intensely. Grown to young womanhood, Rosanne, without understanding why she does it, barters her integrity for diamonds and becomes the tool of smugglers and the rascal diamond merchant Syke Ravenal, who is also madly in love with her. Made frantic by the knowledge of her wrongdoing, she refuses to unburden her soul to her fiancé Sir Dennis Harlenden until after the arrest of the smugglers and the murder of Ravenal by native enemies. Faith in love at last neutralizes the power of the Malay woman's curse and the death of Rachel removes it from her life forever. She becomes the happy bride of Sir Dennis and sails with him to a home in England.

== Cast ==
- Ethel Clayton as Rosanne Ozanne
- Jack Holt as Sir Dennis Harlenden
- Fontaine La Rue as Rachel Bangat
- Mabel Van Buren as Mrs. Ozanne
- Fred Malatesta as Syke Ravenal
- Grace Morse as Kitty Drummond
- Dorothy Messenger as Precious Drummond
- James Smith as Hlangeli
- Guy Oliver as Hlangeli's Father
- Clarence Geldart as Leonard (uncredited)
