= The Mighty McGurk =

1947 film by John Waters

- Poster
- Directed by: John Waters
- Written by: Harry Clork; Grant Garett; William R. Lipman
- Produced by: Nat Perrin
- Starring: Wallace Beery; Dean Stockwell; Edward Arnold; Aline MacMahon
- Cinematography: Charles Schoenbaum
- Edited by: Ben Lewis
- Music by: David Snell
- Production company: Metro-Goldwyn-Mayer
- Distributed by: Loew's Inc.
- Release date: January 2, 1947
- Running time: 85 minutes
- Country: United States
- Language: English
- Budget: $896,000
- Box office: $1,799,000

The Mighty McGurk is a 1947 American sports drama film directed by John Waters and starring Wallace Beery, Dean Stockwell and Edward Arnold. Beery appears as a boozing ex-boxer brawling as a bouncer in a Bowery saloon.

== Plot ==
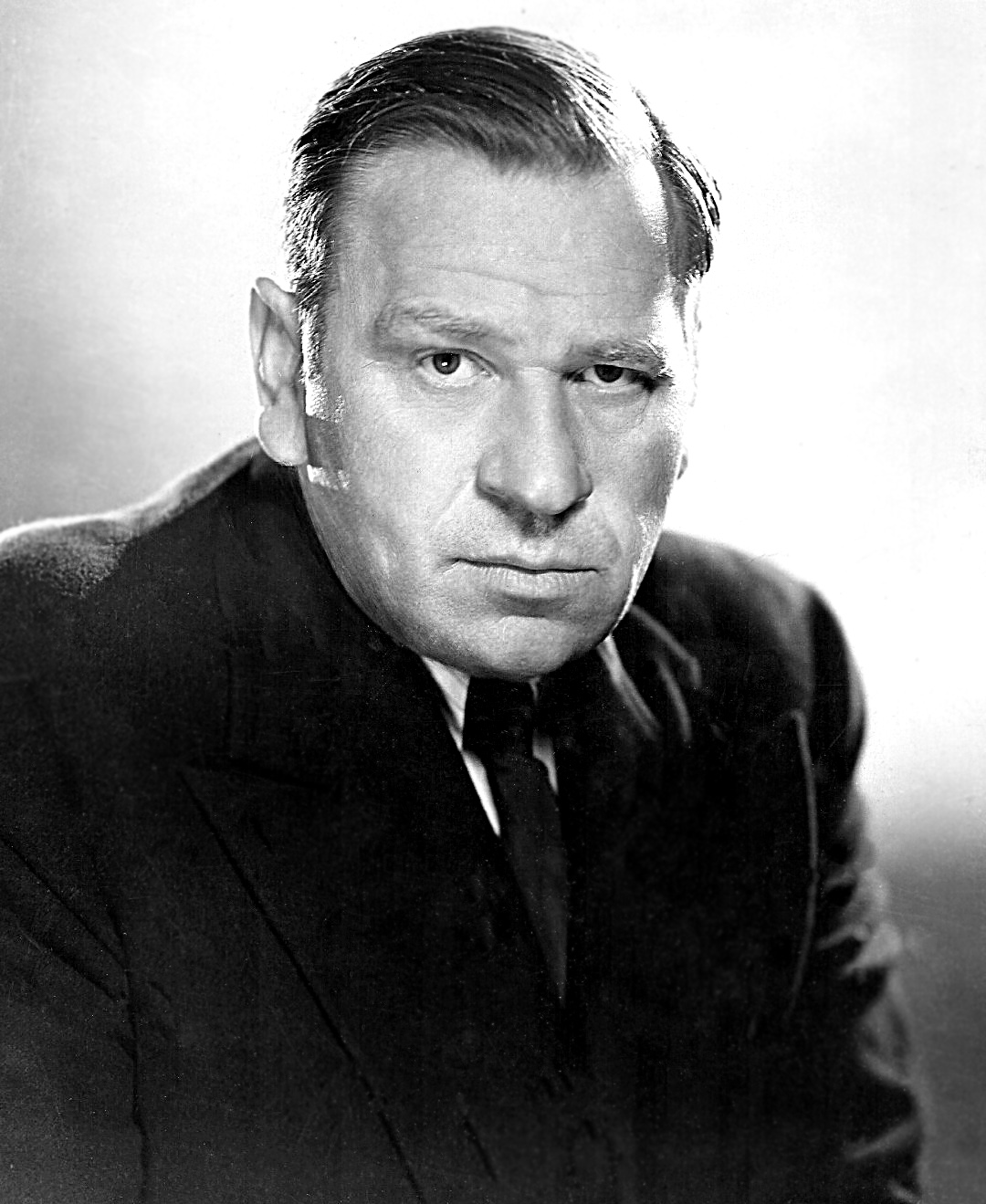
Wallace Beery as Roy "Slag" McGurk

Roy "Slag" McGurk is a former heavyweight boxing champion. Now he make a meager living working as a bouncer in Mike Glenson's saloon in the Bowery district of New York City. Mike's daughter Caroline Glenson has been studying in Europe. According to Slag, her father sent her abroad to break up her romance with Johnny Burden, Mike's former boxing protegee. After crippling one opponent in the ring, Johnny gave up boxing to join the Salvation Army. Mike has to meet two brewers for an important deal, so he sends Slag to pick up Caroline, who is returning by ship from Europe.

Slag later goes to Ellis Island, the entry point for immigrants to New York City. An acquaintance has offered to pay Slag to recruit 50 new immigrants to work for him. When Slag finds the 50th man, he has a young English boy in tow named Nipper. Nipper is an orphan sent to America to live with his uncle Milbane.

Slag reluctantly agrees to deliver the boy to Milbane, but Nipper would rather stay with Slag. When a fight erupts at Ellis Island among rival work recruiters, Nipper either loses or throws away the tag bearing Milbane's address. After searching for Milbane around the city, Slag has no choice but to keep the boy, along with a stray dog that Nipper saved from the dogcatchers.

To complete his deal with the brewers and build the biggest saloon in the Bowery, Mike needs the building occupied by the Salvation Army. He orders Slag to use all possible means to force them out. When Slag refuses, Mike blackmails him. He threatens to tell everyone that Slag won his championship because his opponent deliberately lost. As a further incentive, Mike offers to make Slag a partner in his new saloon for a $2000 investment. Enticed by this deal. Slag figures that he can get that money as a reward from Nipper's uncle.

Meanwhile, the Children's Protective Society learns about Nipper. They tell Slag that the only way he can keep Nipper is to join the Salvation Army, under Johnny's command. When Slag finally locates Milbane and brings the boy to him, Slag discovers that Nipper's uncle is a crook. Not only does Milbane refuse to offer Slag a reward, he tries to convince him to invest in a fraudulent stock. During a loud argument, Nipper learns that Slag was keeping him only for the possible reward. The brokenhearted boy goes back to the Salvation Army building. When word gets around, Slag loses the friendship of his former girlfriend and pawnshop owner Mamie Steeple, who had been loaning him money for years.

Slag arrives at Mike's saloon with a bunch of thugs he recruited. When Mike tells him to arrange a riot at the Salvation Army, Slag finally rebels. He then confesses to all the saloon patrons that his championship bout was rigged. At this point, the hired thugs attack Slag; with Johnny's help, he defeats all of them. Caroline discovers Mike's scheme and packs her bags to move out. Mike tells Johnny to go after her. With the way clear to adopting Nipper, Slag asks Mamie for a loan of $200 ... to pay for a wedding.

== Cast ==
- Wallace Beery as Roy "Slag" McGurk
- Dean Stockwell as Nipper
- Edward Arnold as Mike Glenson
- Aline MacMahon as Mamie Steeple
- Cameron Mitchell as Johnny Burden
- Dorothy Patrick as Caroline Glenson
- Aubrey Mather as Milbane
- Morris Ankrum as Fowles, one of Milbane's crooked associates
- Clinton Sundberg as Flexter, Milbane's other associate
- Charles Judels as First Brewer
- Torben Meyer as Second Brewer
- Joe Yule as Irish Immigrant (uncredited)

== Production ==
The picture bears some similarities to Beery's 1933 film The Bowery, the Raoul Walsh-directed film also starring George Raft, Jackie Cooper and Fay Wray.

== Reception ==
The critic for The New York Times found The Mighty McGurk to be too much like The Champ and other previous Beery efforts, writing,

"while this story of an ex-prizefight champ who befriends an English orphan boy fits our pug as comfortably as an old shoe, it doesn't look much better than an ancient brogan. Mr. Beery, in short, has fought this good fight before and chances are the going will be as familiar and slow for the customers as it seems to be for our hero."

According to MGM records, the film earned $1,397,000 in the United States and Canada and $402,000 elsewhere, resulting in a profit of $314,000.
