= The Water Hole =

1928 film

- Poster for film
- Directed by: F. Richard Jones
- Written by: Herman J. Mankiewicz (titles)
- Based on: The Water Hole by Zane Grey
- Produced by: Adolph Zukor; Jesse L. Lasky
- Starring: Jack Holt; Nancy Carroll; John Boles
- Cinematography: Charles Schoenbaum
- Edited by: Jane Loring
- Color process: Technicolor (only in sequences)
- Distributed by: Paramount Pictures
- Release date: August 25, 1928
- Running time: 70 minutes
- Country: United States
- Languages: Silent; English intertitles

The Water Hole is a 1928 American silent Western film directed by F. Richard Jones starring Jack Holt, Nancy Carroll, and John Boles It was based on a novel by Zane Grey and released by Paramount Pictures. The film had sequences filmed in Technicolor, and it was shot during July in Death Valley, California. No copies of The Water Hole are known to exist, suggesting that it is a lost film.

== Cast ==
- Jack Holt as Philip Randolph
- Nancy Carroll as Judith Endicott
- John Boles as Bert Durland
- C. Montague Shaw as Mr. Endicott
- Ann Christy as Dolores
- Lydia Yeamans Titus as 'Ma' Bennett
- Jack Perrin as Ray
- Jack Mower as Mojave
- Paul Ralli as Diego
- Tex Young as Shorty
- Robert Miles as Joe (credited as Bob Miles)
- Greg Whitespear as Indian

== See also ==
- List of early color feature films
