= The Mysterious Rider (1927 film) =

1927 film

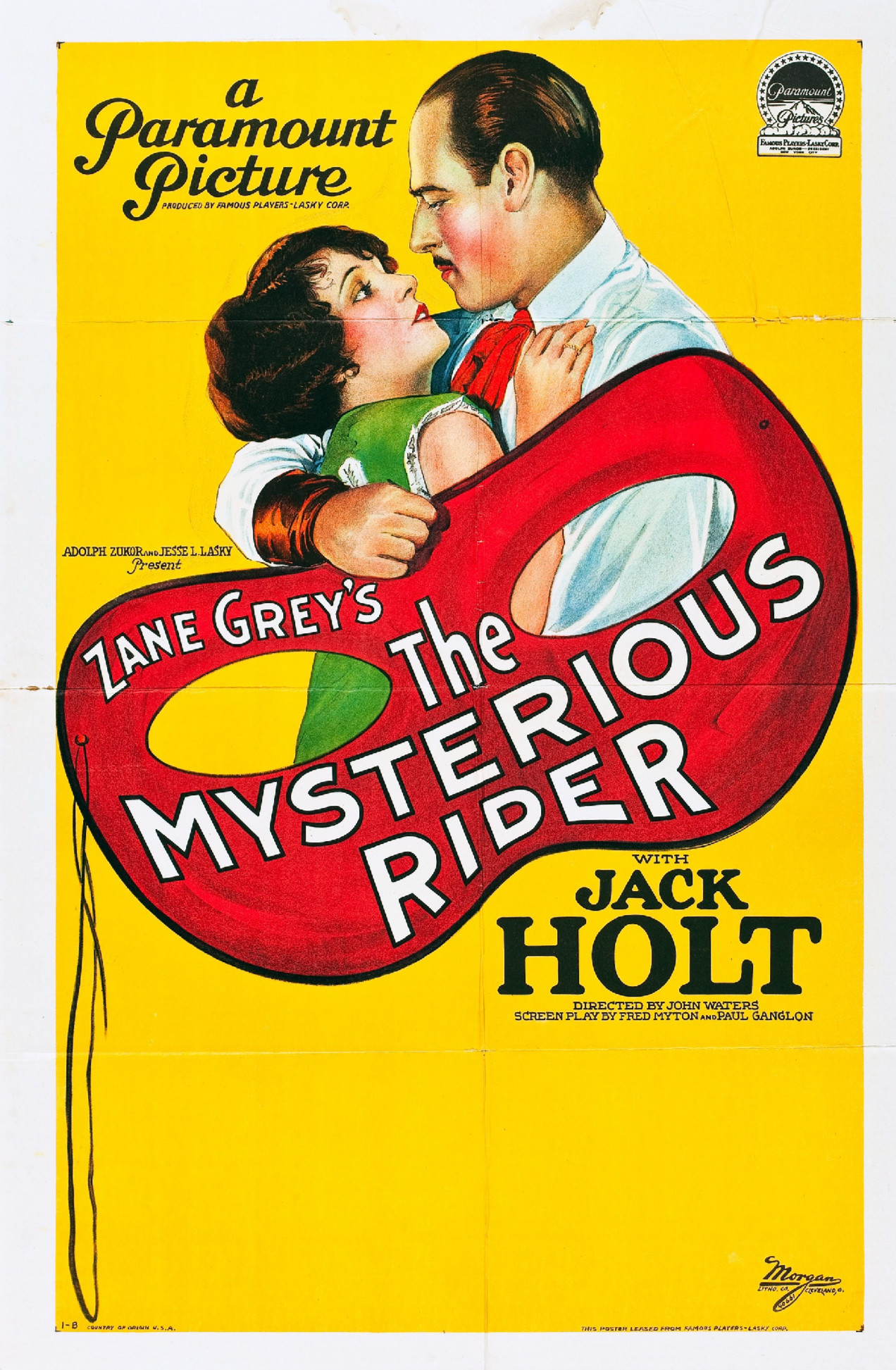
- Film poster
- Directed by: John Waters
- Screenplay by: Paul Gangelin; Alfred Hustwick; Fred Myton
- Based on: The Mysterious Rider by Zane Grey
- Produced by: Jesse L. Lasky; Adolph Zukor
- Starring: Jack Holt; Betty Jewel; Charles Sellon
- Cinematography: Charles Edgar Schoenbaum
- Production company: Famous Players–Lasky Corporation
- Distributed by: Paramount Pictures
- Release date: March 5, 1927
- Running time: 65 minutes
- Country: United States
- Language: Silent (English intertitles)

The Mysterious Rider is a 1927 American silent Western film directed by John Waters and written by Paul Gangelin, Zane Grey, Alfred Hustwick, and Fred Myton. The film stars Jack Holt, Betty Jewel, Charles Sellon, David Torrence, Tom Kennedy, Guy Oliver, and Al Hart. The film was released on March 5, 1927, by Paramount Pictures.

== Plot ==
Based on the Zane Grey novel of the same name, The Mysterious Rider centers around Bent Wade, a mysterious masked rider who fights to save the homesteads of a colony of desert ranchers from illegal seizure. He eventually falls in love with Dorothy King, the daughter of a local financier, after saving her from quicksand.

== Cast ==
- Jack Holt as Bent Wade
- Betty Jewel as Dorothy King
- Charles Sellon as Cliff Harkness
- David Torrence as Mark King
- Tom Kennedy as Lem Spooner
- Guy Oliver as Jack Wilson
- Al Hart as Sheriff
- Ivan Christy as Tom Saunders
- Arthur Hoyt as King's Secretary

== Preservation ==
With no prints of The Mysterious Rider located in any film archives, it is a lost film.
