= The Way of a Man with a Maid (film) =

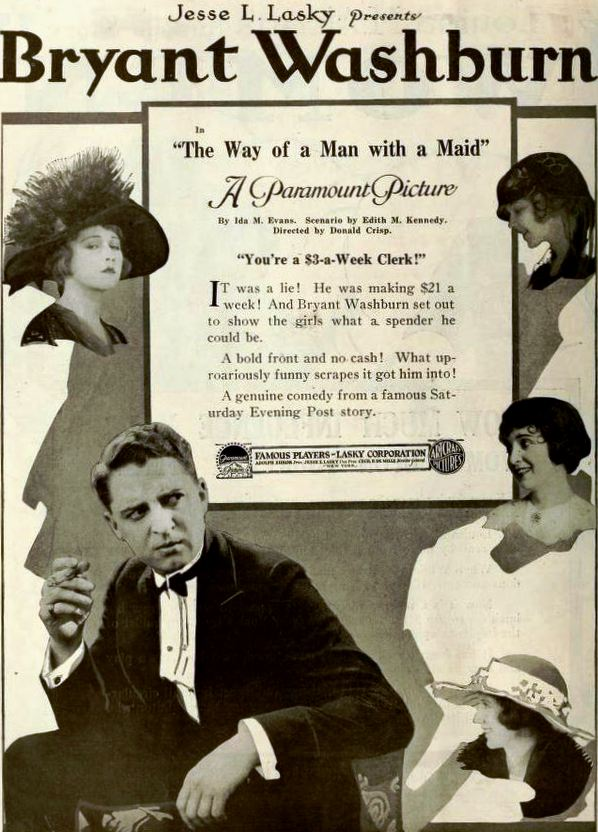
- Advertisement for film
- Directed by: Donald Crisp
- Screenplay by: Ida M. Evans; Edith Kennedy
- Produced by: Jesse L. Lasky
- Starring: Bryant Washburn; Wanda Hawley; Fred Goodwins; Clarence Geldart; Jay Dwiggins; Bessie Eyton
- Cinematography: Henry Kotani; Charles Edgar Schoenbaum
- Production company: Famous Players–Lasky Corporation
- Distributed by: Paramount Pictures
- Release date: December 29, 1918
- Running time: 50 minutes
- Country: United States
- Language: Silent (English intertitles)

The Way of a Man with a Maid is a 1918 American silent comedy film directed by Donald Crisp and written by Ida M. Evans and Edith M. Kennedy. The film stars Bryant Washburn, Wanda Hawley, Fred Goodwins, Clarence Geldart, Jay Dwiggins, and Bessie Eyton. The film was released on December 29, 1918, by Paramount Pictures.

== Plot ==
As described in a film magazine, bookkeeper Arthur McArney attempts to live the life of a man about town on $21 a week. He meets Elsa Owenson, a pretty stenographer, and falls desperately in love. His rival for her is Sankey, a wealthy broker, whose prodigality puts Arthur in the shade. He has trouble keeping up his end of the contest for Elsa's hand as his taxi and restaurant bills appear staggering to him and his kitten, for whom he traded a ukulele. He arranges a date with Elsa, but then must break it when he is called upon by Hallet, his office manager, to work late at night. After Sankey refers to him as a "three dollar a week clerk with rundown heels", Arthur mortgages his salary for weeks and invests $200 in fashionable clothing. The first time he can wear them is for an engagement to escort Elsa to a Halloween party, but again he is called upon to work late at his office. However, he is rewarded with a promotion to a $4,000 a year position. He escorts Elsa home from the party and when he cheerfully pays $10 for their taxi ride, she protests that it could purchase new furniture in their home. But with a new job with increased salary and the prospect of a beautiful bride, Arthur asks, "Why worry about trifles?"

== Cast ==
- Bryant Washburn as Arthur McArney
- Wanda Hawley as Elsa Owenson
- Fred Goodwins as Bick Olsen
- Clarence Geldart as Hallet
- Jay Dwiggins as Sankey
- Bessie Eyton as Gladys
- William Elmer as Bill
- James Neill as Elsa's Father

== Reception ==
Like many American films of the time, The Way of a Man with a Maid was subject to restrictions and cuts by city and state film censorship boards. For example, the Chicago Board of Censors required a cut, in Reel 1, of a closeup of currency and a closeup of coins.
