= Forlorn River (1926 film) =

1926 film

- Directed by: John Waters
- Screenplay by: Zane Grey; George C. Hull
- Produced by: Jesse L. Lasky; Adolph Zukor
- Starring: Jack Holt; Raymond Hatton; Arlette Marchal; Edmund Burns; Tom Santschi; Joseph W. Girard; Christian J. Frank
- Cinematography: Charles Edgar Schoenbaum
- Production company: Famous Players–Lasky Corporation
- Distributed by: Paramount Pictures
- Release date: September 27, 1926
- Running time: 65 minutes
- Country: United States
- Languages: Silent; English intertitles

Forlorn River is a 1926 American silent Western film directed by John Waters and written by Zane Grey and George C. Hull. The film stars Jack Holt, Raymond Hatton, Arlette Marchal, Edmund Burns, Tom Santschi, Joseph W. Girard and Christian J. Frank. It is based on the 1926 serialization of the 1927 novel Forlorn River by Zane Grey. The film was released on September 27, 1926, by Paramount Pictures.

Parts of the film were shot in Zion National Park, Bryce Canyon, and Cedar Breaks National Monument.

The film is now considered lost.

== Cast ==
- Jack Holt as Nevada
- Raymond Hatton as Arizona Pete
- Arlette Marchal as Ina Blaine
- Edmund Burns as Ben Ide
- Tom Santschi as Bill Hall
- Joseph W. Girard as Hart Blaine
- Christian J. Frank as Les Setter
- Nola Luxford as Magda Lee
- Al Hart as Sheriff Stroble
- Nola Dolberg as Magda Lee
- Chief Yowlachie as Modoc Joe
- Jack Moore as Deputy
