= Drums of the Desert (1927 film) =

1927 film

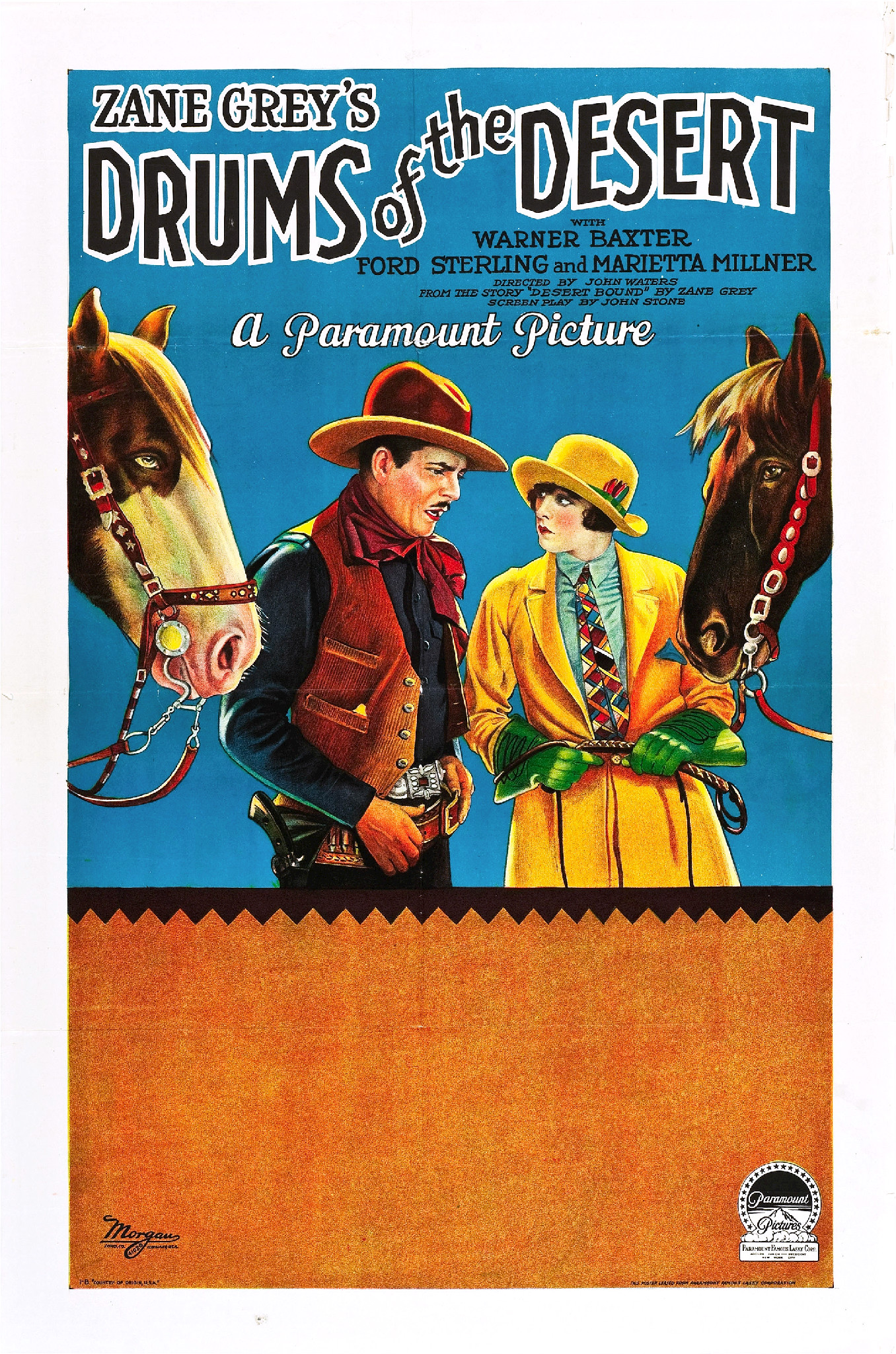
- Film poster
- Directed by: John Waters
- Screenplay by: Zane Grey; John Stone
- Produced by: Jesse L. Lasky; Adolph Zukor
- Starring: Warner Baxter; Marietta Millner; Ford Sterling; Wallace MacDonald; Heinie Conklin; George Irving; Bernard Siegel
- Cinematography: Charles Edgar Schoenbaum
- Production company: Famous Players–Lasky Corporation
- Distributed by: Paramount Pictures
- Release date: June 4, 1927
- Running time: 65 minutes
- Country: United States
- Languages: Silent; English intertitles

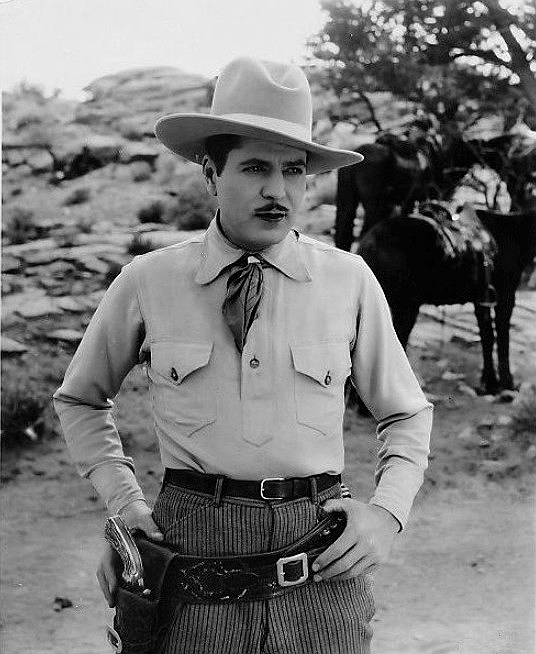
Still with Warner Baxter.

Drums of the Desert is a 1927 American silent Western film directed by John Waters and written by Zane Grey and John Stone. The film stars Warner Baxter, Marietta Millner, Ford Sterling, Wallace MacDonald, Heinie Conklin, George Irving, and Bernard Siegel. The film was released on June 4, 1927, by Paramount Pictures.

== Cast ==
- Warner Baxter as John Curry
- Marietta Millner as Mary Manton
- Ford Sterling as Perkins
- Wallace MacDonald as Will Newton
- Heinie Conklin as Hi-Lo
- George Irving as Professor Elias Manton
- Bernard Siegel as Chief Brave Bear
- Guy Oliver as Indian Agent

== Preservation ==
With no holdings located in archives, Drum of the Desert is considered a lost film.
