= Jack Holt (actor) =

American actor (1888–1951)

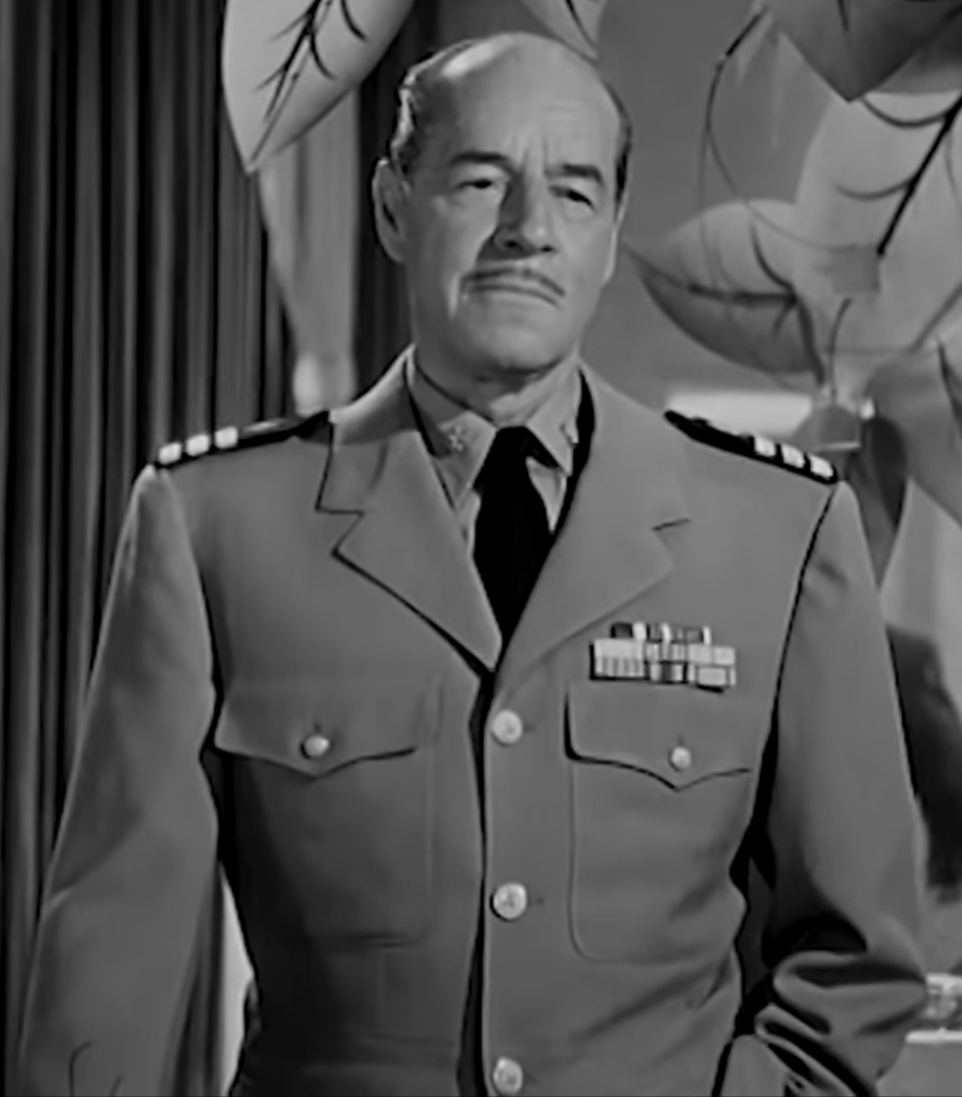
- Holt in The Chase (1946)
- Born: Charles John Holt, Jr. May 31, 1888; Bronx, New York, U.S.
- Died: January 18, 1951 (aged 62); Sawtelle, Los Angeles, California, U.S.
- Resting place: Los Angeles National Cemetery
- Occupation: Actor
- Years active: 1914–1951
- Spouse: Margaret Woods
- Children: 3; including Tim Holt and Jennifer Holt

Charles John Holt, Jr. (May 31, 1888 – January 18, 1951) was an American motion picture actor who was prominent in both silent and sound movies, particularly Westerns.

== Early life ==
Holt was born in 1888 in the Fordham section of The Bronx, New York, the son of an Episcopal priest at St. James Church. When in Manhattan, he attended Trinity School. He was accepted into the Virginia Military Institute in 1909, but expelled for misbehavior in his second semester there.

Following Holt's father's death, the family moved to Manhattan, where Jack, his mother, and brother Marshall lived with his married sister, Frances.

Holt worked at various jobs, including construction of the Pennsylvania Railroad's tunnel under the Hudson River and being a "surveyor, laborer, prospector, trapper, and stagecoach driver, among many other jobs" during an almost six-year stay in Alaska.

== Military service ==
Holt was prevented from serving in World War I because of "chronic foot problems" from frostbite when he was in Alaska. On January 28, 1943, Holt reported for duty with the rank of captain in the Army Quartermaster Corps. He began training at Fort Francis E. Warren.

== Film career ==
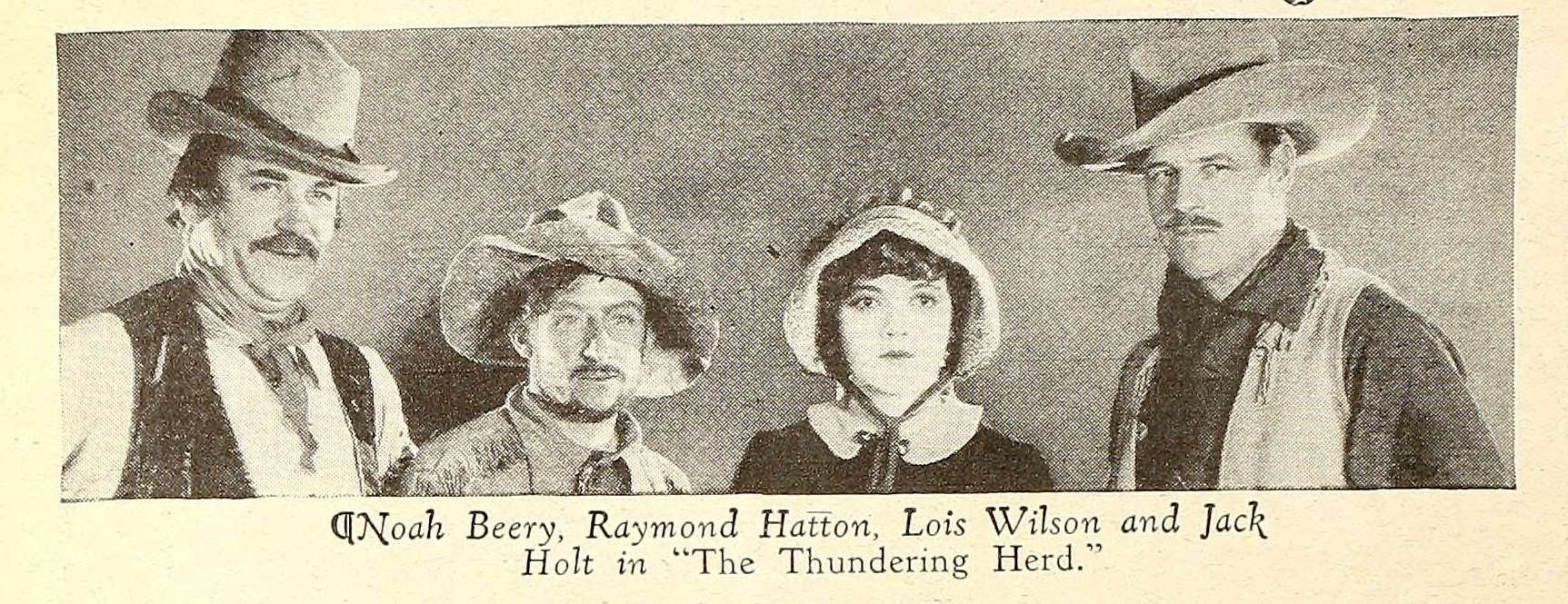
Noah Beery, Raymond Hatton, Lois Wilson, and Jack Holt in The Thundering Herd (1925)

Holt began in Hollywood with stunt work and bit parts in serials and at Universal Pictures worked as a supporting player for Francis Ford and his brother John Ford, and Grace Cunard.

In his 1914 film debut, Holt rode a horse down a steep embankment into the Russian River in a scene for Salomy Jane. The stunt cracked some of Holt's ribs and injured the horse so badly that it had to be destroyed. The film, which was considered lost for years, was included in the DVD released 2011 anthology Treasures 5 The West 1898—1938 by the National Film Preservation Foundation after a print was discovered in Australia.

Holt appeared in three Frank Capra action dramas: Submarine (1928), Flight (1929) and Dirigible (1931). Holt's characterizations were eclipsed by younger actors like James Cagney and Chester Morris, but still played leads. Two mid-1930s features, Whirlpool and The Defense Rests, starred Holt opposite up-and-coming ingenue Jean Arthur.

Exhibitors had come to associate Jack Holt with rough-and-tumble action, and so Holt continued to work in low-budget crime dramas (mostly for Columbia) through 1940. The series came to an end when he argued with studio chief Harry Cohn. Cohn thought the actor so arrogant that he assigned Holt the leading role in a lowbrow 15-chapter serial, Holt of the Secret Service (1941). Holt — the star of longest standing with the studio — was insulted by Cohn's demotion; although he turned in a professional performance in the serial, he walked out on both Cohn and Columbia.

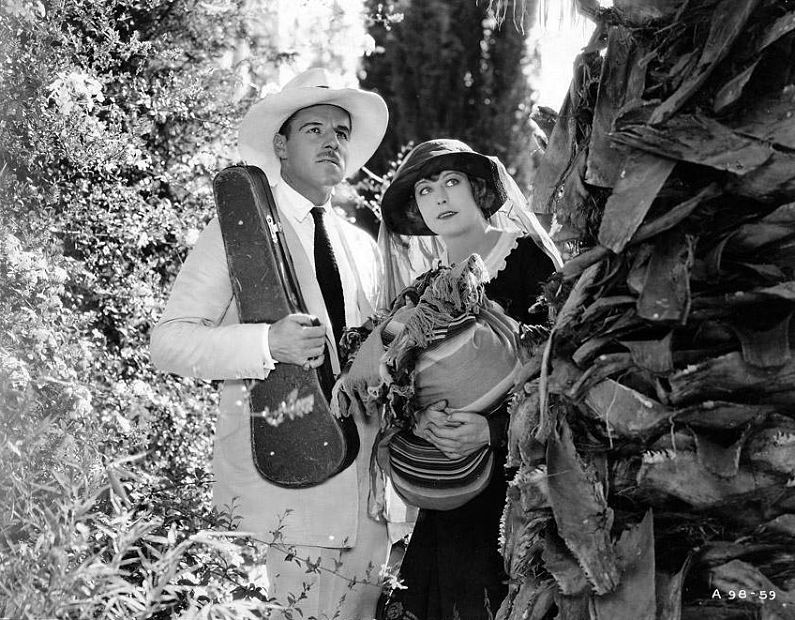
Holt and Seena Owen in Victory (1919)

Holt began freelancing at other studios, frequently appearing in outdoor and western fare. He would become an enduring member of the cowboy fraternity through Trail of Robin Hood (1950), a Roy Rogers western with guest appearances by Holt, Allan Lane, Tom Keene, Tom Tyler, Kermit Maynard, and Rex Allen.

Holt's children established their own film careers. Tim Holt succeeded George O'Brien as the star of RKO Radio Pictures' "B" westerns, and co-starred with his father in The Treasure of the Sierra Madre (1948), with Jack as a grubby vagrant. Jennifer Holt played ingenues in low-budget features, mostly for Universal Pictures. The Holt family performed together on the "Drifty" episode of All Star Western Theater (KNX-CBS Pacific Network, 1946/47) as a father/son/daughter trio featuring a dramatic sketch and additional entertainment by Foy Willing and the Riders of the Purple Sage.

== Personal life ==
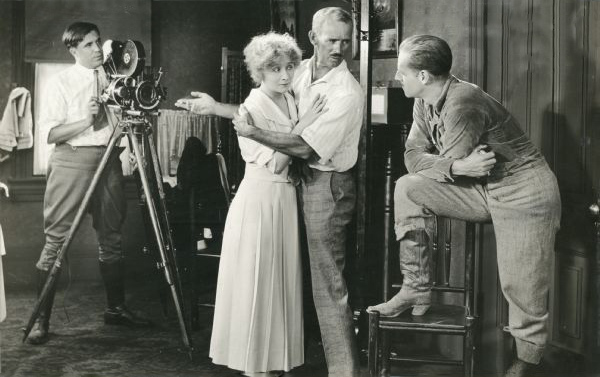
Original caption: "Howard C. Hickman, husband and director of Bessie Barriscale, shows leading man Jack Holt how to make love to Mrs. Hickman." This appears to be a production still from Kitty Kelly, M.D. (1919). If so, the cameraman behind the Bell & Howell model 2709 is Eugene Gaudio.

Holt married divorcee Margaret Wood in 1918. She obtained a divorce in Mexico in 1932 but, on January 9, 1940, a judge in Los Angeles ruled that the divorce was invalid. Her father, tycoon Henry Morton Stanley-Wood, disowned her because she married an actor; they later made up after her father lost most of his money in the Great Depression. She already had a daughter when she married Holt, and together they had a son, Charles John Holt III, and a daughter, Elizabeth Marshall Holt. Better known as Tim and Jennifer, respectively, both of them became actors in western films. Holt was a lifetime member of the Society of Colonial Wars, admitted to the California Society on July 13, 1928.

== Death ==
Holt died in 1951 of a heart attack, at age 62. He was interred at Los Angeles National Cemetery.

== Contribution ==
Holt has a star on the Hollywood Walk of Fame at 6313-½ Hollywood Blvd for his contribution to the motion picture industry.

Margaret Mitchell, although having no say in the casting for Gone With the Wind (1939), expressed her preference for Jack Holt as Rhett Butler, because her personal favorite, Charles Boyer, had a French accent.

== Filmography ==
- Salomy Jane (1914) as Solitaire-Playing Cowboy in Saloon (uncredited)
- The Master Key (1914, Serial) as Donald Faversham
- The Broken Coin (1915, Serial) as Captain Williams
- Jewel (1915) as Nat Bonnell
- The Dumb Girl of Portici (1916) as Conde
- Naked Hearts (1916) as Howard
- Liberty (1916, Serial) as Captain Bob Rutledge
- Saving the Family Name (1916) as Jansen Winthrop
- The Chalice of Sorrow (1916) (uncredited)
- The Black Sheep of the Family (1916) as Kenneth Carmont
- Joan the Woman (1916) (uncredited)
- Patria (1917, Serial)
- The Cost of Hatred (1917) as Huertez
- Sacrifice (1917) as Paul Ekald
- Giving Becky a Chance (1917) as Tom Fielding
- The Inner Shrine (1917) as Viscount D'Arcourt
- The Little American (1917) as Karl von Austreim
- The Call of the East (1917) as Alan Hepburn
- The Secret Game (1917) as Maj. John Northfield
- The Hidden Pearls (1918) as Robert Garvin
- The Claw (1918) as Maurice Stair
- One More American (1918) as Sam Potts
- Headin' South (1918)
- Love Me (1918) as Gordon Appleby
- The Honor of His House (1918) as Robert Farlow
- The White Man's Law (1918) as Sir Harry Falkland
- The Iron Claw (1916, Serial) as Maurice Stair
- A Desert Wooing (1918) as Barton Masters
- Green Eyes (1918) as Pearson Hunter
- The Marriage Ring (1918) as Rodney Heathe
- The Road Through the Dark (1918) as Duke Karl
- The Squaw Man (1918) as Cash Hawkins
- Cheating Cheaters (1919) as Tom Palmer
- A Midnight Romance (1919) as Roger Sloan
- For Better, for Worse (1919) as Crusader
- The Woman Thou Gavest Me (1919) as Lord Raa
- A Sporting Chance (1919) as Paul Sayre
- The Woman Michael Married (1919) as Michael Ordsway
- The Life Line (1919) as Jack Hearne, the Romany Rye
- Kitty Kelly, M.D. (1919) as Bob Lang
- Victory (1919) as Axel Heyst
- The Best of Luck (1920) as Kenneth, Lord Glenayr
- Crooked Streets (1920) as Rupert O'Dare
- Held by the Enemy (1920) as Col. Charles Prescott
- The Sins of Rosanne (1920) as Sir Dennis Harlenden
- Midsummer Madness (1920) as Bob Meredith
- All Soul's Eve (1921) as Roger Heath
- Ducks and Drakes (1921) as Rob Winslow
- The Lost Romance (1921) as Mark Sheridan
- The Mask (1921) as Kenneth Traynor / Handsome Jack
- After the Show (1921) as Larry Taylor
- The Grim Comedian (1921) as Harvey Martin
- The Call of the North (1921) as Ned Trent
- Bought and Paid For (1922) as Robert Stafford
- North of the Rio Grande (1922) as Bob Haddington
- While Satan Sleeps (1922) as Phil
- The Man Unconquerable (1922) as Robert Kendall
- On the High Seas (1922) as Jim Dorn
- Making a Man (1922) as Horace Winsby
- Nobody's Money (1923) as John Webster
- The Tiger's Claw (1923) as Sam Sandell
- A Gentleman of Leisure (1923) as Robert Pitt
- Hollywood (1923) as himself
- The Cheat (1923) as Dudley Drake
- The Marriage Maker (1923) as Lord Stonbury
- Don't Call It Love (1923) as Richard Parrish
- The Lone Wolf (1924) as Michael Lanyard
- Wanderer of the Wasteland (1924) as Adam Larey
- Empty Hands (1924) as Grimshaw
- North of 36 (1924) as Don McMasters
- Eve's Secret (1925) as Duke of Poltava
- The Thundering Herd (1925) as Tom Doan
- The Light of Western Stars (1925) as Gene Stewart
- Wild Horse Mesa (1925) as Chane Weymer
- The Ancient Highway (1925) as Cliff Brant
- The Enchanted Hill (1926) as Lee Purdy
- Sea Horses (1926) as George Glanville
- The Blind Goddess (1926) as Hugh Dillon
- Born to the West (1926) as 'Colorado' Dare Rudd
- Forlorn River (1926) as Nevada
- Man of the Forest (1926) as Milt Dale
- The Mysterious Rider (1927) as Bent Wade
- The Tigress (1927) as Winston Graham, Earl of Eddington
- The Warning (1927) as Tom Fellows / Col. Robert Wellsley
- The Smart Set (1928) as Nelson
- The Vanishing Pioneer (1928) as Anthony Ballard / John Ballard
- Court-Martial (1928) as James Camden
- The Water Hole (1928) as Philip Randolph
- Submarine (1928) as Jack Dorgan
- Avalanche (1928) as Jack Dunton
- Sunset Pass (1929) as Jack Rock
- The Donovan Affair (1929) as Insp. Killian
- Father and Son (1929) as Frank Fields
- Flight (1929) as Panama Williams
- Vengeance (1930) as John Meadham
- The Border Legion (1930) as Jack Kells
- Hell's Island (1930) as Mac
- The Squealer (1930) as Charles Hart
- The Last Parade (1931) as Cookie Leonard
- Dirigible (1931) as Jack Bradon
- Subway Express (1931) as Inspector Killian
- White Shoulders (1931) as Gordon Kent
- Fifty Fathoms Deep (1931) as Tim Burke
- A Dangerous Affair (1931) as Lt. McHenry
- Maker of Men (1931) as Coach Dudley
- Behind the Mask (1932) as Jack Hart aka Quinn
- War Correspondent (1932) as Jim Kenyon
- This Sporting Age (1932) as Capt. John Steele
- Man Against Woman (1932) as Johnny McCloud
- Hollywood Speaks (1932) as himself
- When Strangers Marry (1933) as Steve Rand
- The Woman I Stole (1933) as Jim Bradler
- The Wrecker (1933) as Chuck Regan
- Master of Men (1933) as Buck Garrett
- Whirlpool (1934) as Buck Rankin
- Black Moon (1934) as Stephen Lane
- The Defense Rests (1934) as Matthew Mitchell
- I'll Fix It (1934) as Bill Grimes
- The Best Man Wins (1935) as Nick Roberts
- Storm Over the Andes (1935) as Bob Kent
- The Unwelcome Stranger (1935) as Howard W. Chamberlain
- The Awakening of Jim Burke (1935) as Jim Burke
- The Littlest Rebel (1935) as Col. Morrison
- Dangerous Waters (1936) as Jim Marlowe
- San Francisco (1936) as Jack Burley
- Crash Donovan (1936) as 'Crash' Donovan
- End of the Trail (1936) as Dale Brittenham
- North of Nome (1936) as John Raglan
- Trouble in Morocco (1937) as Paul Cluett
- Roaring Timber (1937) as Jim Sherwood
- Outlaws of the Orient (1937) as Chet Eaton
- Trapped by G-Men (1937) as G-Man Martin Galloway, Posing as Bill Donovan
- Under Suspicion (1937) as Robert Bailey
- Making the Headlines (1938) as Police Lt. Lewis Nagel
- Flight into Nowhere (1938) as Jim Horne
- Reformatory (1938) as Robert Dean
- Crime Takes a Holiday (1938) as Walter Forbes
- The Strange Case of Dr. Meade (1938) as Dr. Meade
- Whispering Enemies (1939) as Stephen Brewster
- Trapped in the Sky (1939) as Major
- Fugitive at Large (1939) as Tom Farrow / George Storm
- Hidden Power (1939) as Dr. Garfield
- Outside the Three-Mile Limit (1940) as Treasury Agent Conway
- Passport to Alcatraz (1940) as George Hollister
- Fugitive from a Prison Camp (1940) as Sheriff Lawson
- The Great Plane Robbery (1940) as Mike Henderson
- The Great Swindle (1941) as Jack Regan
- Holt of the Secret Service (1941, Serial) as Jack Holt / Nick Farrell
- Thunder Birds (1942) as Colonel MacDonald
- Northwest Rangers (1942) as Duncan Frazier
- Cat People (1942) as The Commodore
- They Were Expendable (1945) as General Martin
- My Pal Trigger (1946) as Brett Scoville
- Flight to Nowhere (1946) as FBI Agent Bob Donovan
- The Chase (1946) as Cmdr. Davidson
- Renegade Girl (1946) as Maj. Barker
- The Wild Frontier (1947) as Charles 'Saddles' Barton
- The Treasure of the Sierra Madre (1948) as Flophouse Bum (uncredited)
- The Arizona Ranger (1948) as Rawhide Morgan
- The Gallant Legion (1948) as Capt. Banner
- The Strawberry Roan (1948) as Walt Bailey
- Loaded Pistols (1948) as Dave Randall
- The Last Bandit (1949) as Mort Pemberton
- Brimstone (1949) as Marshal Walter Greenslide
- Task Force (1949) as Captain Reeves
- Red Desert (1949) as Deacon Smith
- The Daltons' Women (1950) as Clint Dalton – Mike Leonard
- Return of the Frontiersman (1950) as Sheriff Sam Barrett
- Trail of Robin Hood (1950) as himself
- King of the Bullwhip (1950) as Banker James Kerrigan
- Across the Wide Missouri (1951) as Bear Ghost (final film role)
