= Clarence Geldart =

American actor

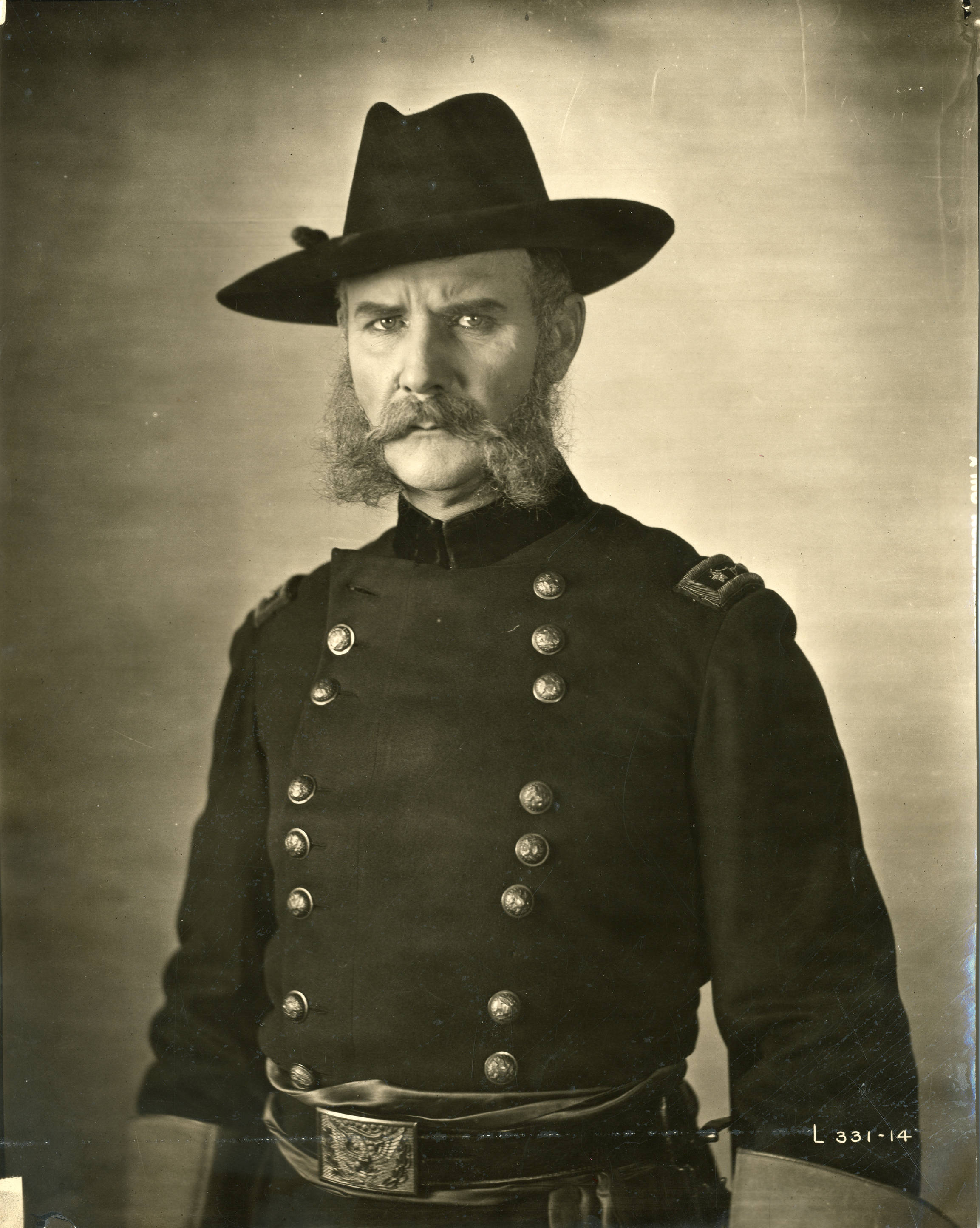
- Geldart in Held by the Enemy (1920)
- Born: June 9, 1867; New Brunswick, Canada
- Died: May 13, 1935 (aged 67); Calabasas, California, U.S.
- Other name: Charles H. Geldart
- Occupation: Actor
- Years active: 1915–1935

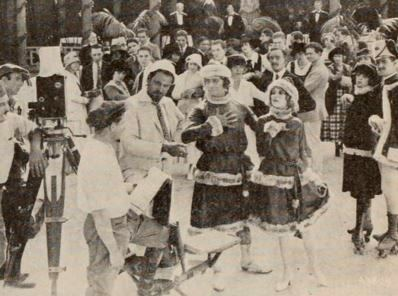
Still of Geldart (left foreground) portraying a casting director organizing an ice-skating routine in The Goat (1918)

Clarence Geldart (June 9, 1867 – May 13, 1935) was an American film actor. He appeared in 127 films between 1915 and 1936. He was sometimes credited as C.H. Geldart or Charles H. Geldart.

He was born in New Brunswick, Canada, and died in Calabasas, California.

Geldart's Broadway credits include King Henry V (1900) and Beaucaire (1901).

== Partial filmography ==
- The Hidden Pearls (1918)
- Believe Me, Xantippe - William (1918)
- Till I Come Back to You (1918)
- The Goat (1918)
- The Squaw Man (1918)
- The Way of a Man with a Maid (1918)
- The Dub (1919)
- The Poor Boob (1919)
- Captain Kidd, Jr. (1919)
- Putting It Over (1919) (as C.H. Geldert)
- Love Insurance (1919)
- Too Much Johnson (1919) (as Charles H. Geldart)
- Everywoman (1919)
- Don't Change Your Husband (1919)
- The Tree of Knowledge (1920)
- Why Change Your Wife? (1920)
- Thou Art the Man (1920) (as Charles H. Geldart)
- A Lady in Love (1920)
- Sick Abed (1920)
- Crooked Streets (1920) (as Charles H. Geldart)
- The Fourteenth Man (1920)
- Held by the Enemy (1920)
- The Sins of Rosanne (1920) (as C. H. Geldart)
- All Soul's Eve (1921)
- The Lost Romance (1921)
- The Great Moment (1921)
- The Hell Diggers (1921)
- Rent Free (1922)
- A Woman of Paris (1923)
- Love's Whirlpool (1924)
- The Fighting American (1924)
- North of 36 (1924)
- Behind the Curtain (1924)
- Oh Doctor! (1925)
- The Bandit's Baby (1925)
- Young April (1926)
- Racing Blood (1926)
- Hands Across the Border (1926)
- The Unholy Night (1929)
- Square Shoulders (1929)
- The Office Scandal (1929)
- The Thirteenth Chair (1929)
- Road to Paradise (1930)
- Jungle Bride (1933)
- Dance Hall Hostess (1933)
- Rusty Rides Alone (1933)
- Unknown Valley (1933)
- Marriage on Approval (1933)
- Notorious but Nice (1933)
- Revenge at Monte Carlo (1933)
- Broken Dreams (1933)
- In Love with Life (1934)
- The Man Trailer (1934)
- Mississippi (1935)
- Border Vengeance (1935)
