= Marion Morgan (choreographer) =

American choreographer and motion picture screenwriter

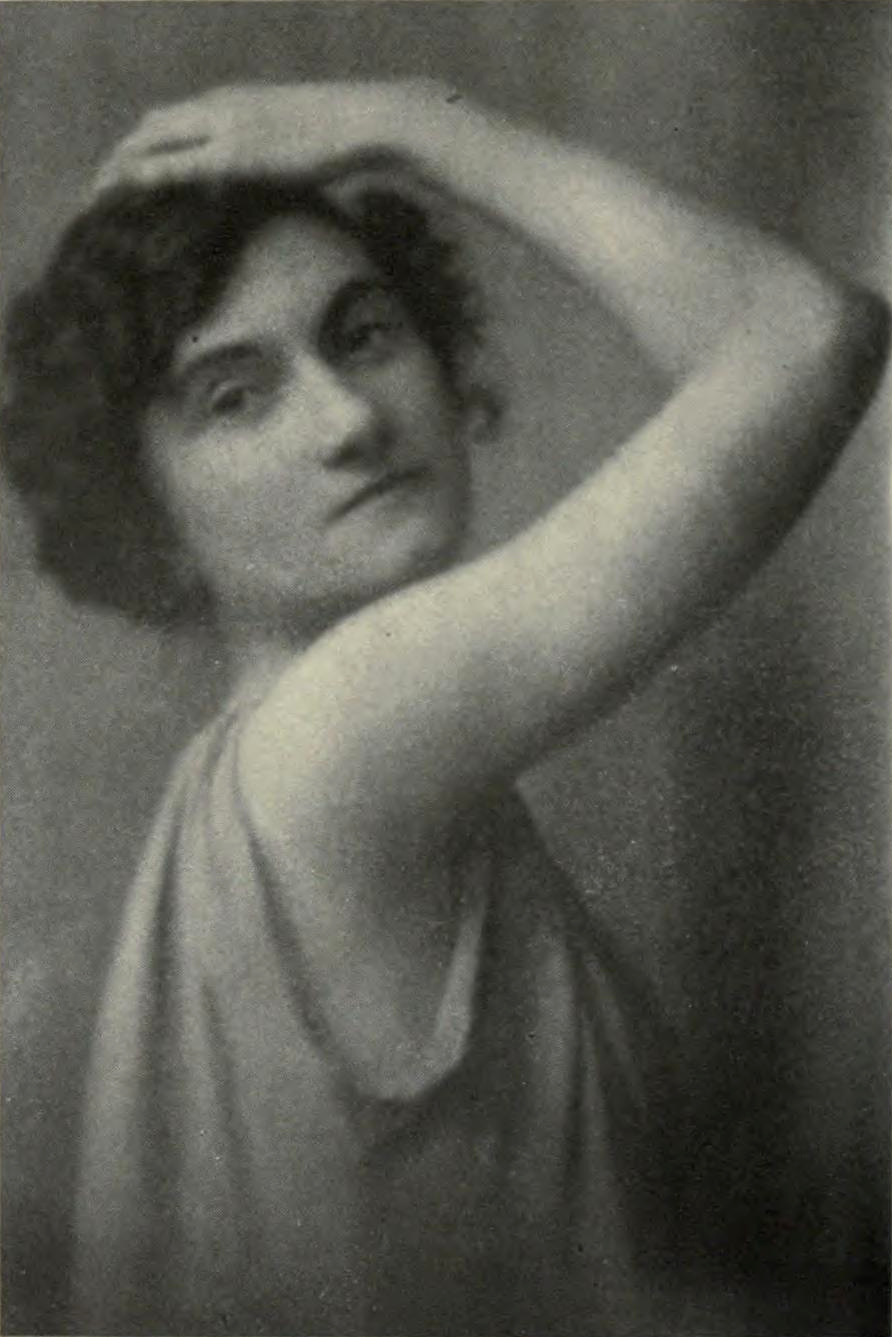
- Morgan in 1917
- Born: Marion R. Cahill; January 4, 1881; Paterson, New Jersey, U.S.
- Died: November 10, 1971 (aged 90); Los Angeles, California, U.S.
- Burial place: Forest Lawn Memorial Park (Glendale), U.S.
- Occupation: Choreographer
- Partner(s): Matthew A. Morgan (1900–1905); Dorothy Arzner (1927–1971)
- Children: 1
- Parent(s): John F. Cahill (father); Emily Cahill (mother)

Marion Morgan (January 4, 1881 – November 10, 1971) was an American choreographer and motion picture screenwriter and the longtime romantic partner of motion picture director Dorothy Arzner. Arzner lived for the last 40 years of her life with Morgan.

== Early life ==
Marion R. Cahill was born on January 4, 1881, in Paterson, New Jersey, to Emily and John F. Cahill, who was an attorney. She married Matthew A. Morgan in 1900, and the next year, the couple had a son, Roderick, before separating by 1905. By 1910, Marion and her son had relocated to Long Beach, California, where she was employed as a physical education teacher at Manual Arts High School in Los Angeles. Later, when she was hired as a dance instructor for the summer program at the University of California, Berkeley, she began recruiting girls for a dance troupe to perform in vaudeville on the Orpheum Circuit. In 1915, she also staged a publicity dance in the snow in Manhattan's Central Park. Initially, Morgan featured six young women who had studied together in California. The group then grew to up to twenty-five members and, at times, would employ a male dancer. They performed interpretive dances, bare-armed and sometimes bare-footed, in filmy costumes, with a repertoire based on Egyptian and classical Greek and Roman themes.

Morgan had specific requirements for her dancers to remain fit. They were required to be vegetarians, all were practicing Christian Scientists at one point, and they all had to study classic literature to understand their roles. The group toured throughout the country, creating a sensation wherever they appeared. In 1921, Morgan met Dorothy Arzner on the set of the movie Man-Woman-Marriage directed by Allen Holubar. The meeting prompted a passionate personal relationship which would later blossom into a business relationship as well. After more than a decade of performances on the vaudeville stage, Morgan began to create choreography for movies, such as Paris at Midnight (1926). She also created choreography for movies like A Night of Love (1926), The Masked Woman (1927), and Up in Mabel's Room (1926), in which the Marion Morgan Dancers performed.

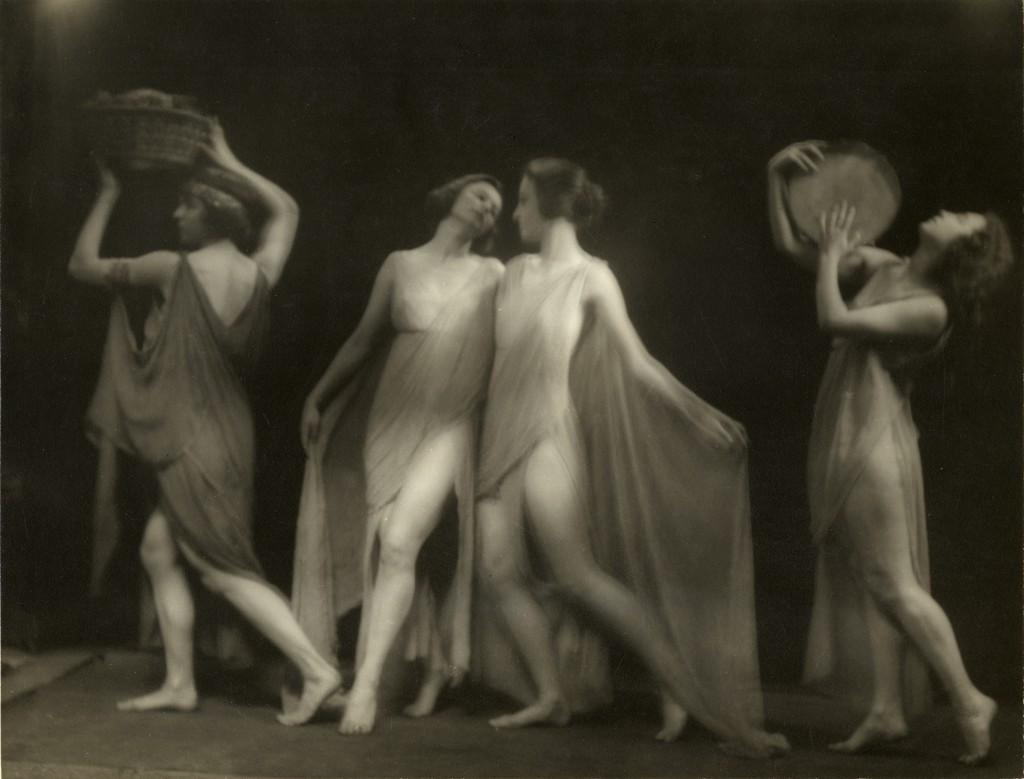
Marion Morgan Dancers

Arzner and Morgan first worked together in 1927 on the set of Fashions for Women, when Arzner, in her directorial debut film, hired Morgan to choreograph the fashion show. That same year, in Arzner's Get Your Man, Morgan created a tableau featuring her dancers in a wax museum, which Variety called the highlight of the film. In Manhattan Cocktail, (1928) the couple paired again, with Morgan choreographing the opening prologue with the tale of Ariadne and Theseus, which her dancers had previously performed on stage. In 1930, the couple moved into a house they named "Armor", giving nod to Mary Pickford and Douglas Fairbank's "Pickfair", which was located on Mountain Oak Drive in the Hollywood Hills.

During the 1930s, Morgan frequently traveled to the East Coast and Europe and in 1934, she graduated from the Yale School of Drama. In the mid-1930s, Morgan teamed with George B. Dowell and wrote several short stories. Mae West co-scripted both Goin' to Town (1935) and Klondike Annie (1936) with the duo. In 1951, the pair moved to the desert of Palm Springs, where they lived until Morgan's death.

== Death and legacy ==
Morgan died on November 10, 1971, at Los Angeles. Morgan is buried at Forest Lawn Memorial Park (Glendale) together with her son, Roderick D. Morgan (1901–1929).

Her dance archives are preserved at the Jerome Robbins Dance Division of the New York Public Library for the Performing Arts.
