= Lucky Devils =

Lucky Devils is the title of three films:

- Lucky Devils (1932 film), a Swedish comedy film starring Sigurd Wallén and Tutta Rolf
- Lucky Devils (1933 film), an American film starring William Boyd and Bruce Cabot
- Lucky Devils (1941 film), an American film featuring Andy Devine and Richard Arlen

== See also ==
- The Lucky Devil, a 1925 film starring Richard Dix
