= Alfred Gilks =

American cinematographer (1891–1970)

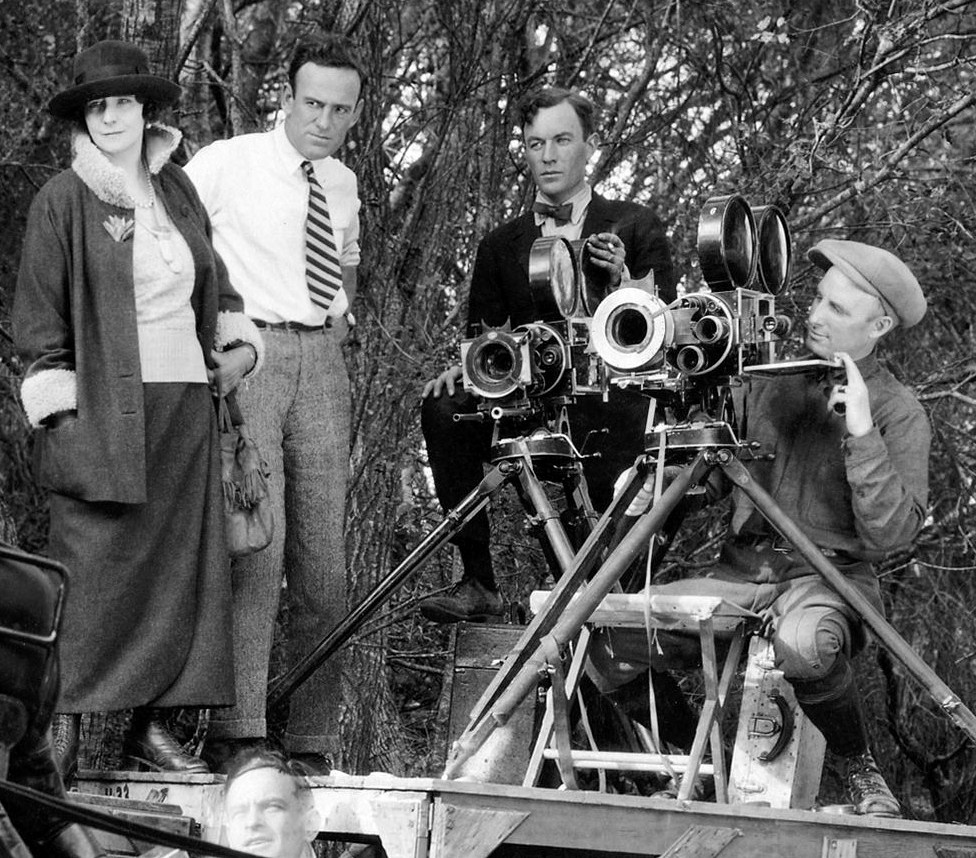
- Gilks (center) on the set of the 1922 film Beyond the Rocks with (left to right) novelist Elinor Glyn, director Sam Wood, and cameraman Osmond Borradaile
- Born: December 29, 1891; Los Angeles, California, USA
- Died: September 6, 1970 (aged 78); Hollywood, California, USA
- Occupation: Cinematographer
- Years active: 1920–1958

Alfred Gilks (29 December 1891 – 6 September 1970) was an American cinematographer from 1920 through to 1956. Gilks has worked on over sixty films and is known for utilizing his U.S. Navy background to capture and operate one of the first 'nautical cameras' for the film Old Ironsides.

Gilks won one Academy Award for his cinematography in the film An American in Paris (1951) before retiring from the cinematography work in 1960.

== Career ==
Gilks began his career in cinematography in 1918 while serving as a member of the Field Photographic Unit of the Office of Strategic Services. He then went to work for Paramount Studios while remaining involved with other production companies such as MGM, RKO Radio Pictures, and C.V. Whitney Pictures. Alfred Gilks joined the American Society of Cinematographers in 1922 and eventually won his first and only Oscar with his film An American in Paris.

Gilks worked on many silent films in the 1920s, such as Red Hair (1928) with Clara Bow and the historical epic Old Ironsides (1926) starring Esther Ralston. In the latter film, he used some of the first motorized camera equipment on a production.

He also worked on well-known sound films such as Miss Fane's Baby Is Stolen (1934), Ruggles of Red Gap (1935), several of the Dr. Kildare movies, and his Oscar-winning work on An American in Paris (1951). Gilks shared the Best Cinematography Academy Award for An American in Paris with John Alton. His last credit was for second unit photography on John Ford's seminal The Searchers (1956).

== Selected filmography ==
- Double Speed (1920)
- Sick Abed (1920)
- Her Beloved Villain (1920)
- Her Husband's Trademark (1922)
- Beyond the Rocks (1922)
- Prodigal Daughters (1923)
- Bluebeard's 8th Wife (1923)
- His Children's Children (1923)
- The Enchanted Hill (1926)
- The Blind Goddess (1926)
- Old Ironsides (1926)
- Ten Modern Commandments (1927)
- Figures Don't Lie (1927)
- Get Your Man (1927)
- Red Hair (1928)
- The First Kiss (1928)
- Jealousy (1929)
- Secrets of the French Police (1932)
- Miss Fane's Baby Is Stolen (1934)
- Ruggles of Red Gap (1935)
- Dancing Co-Ed (1939)
- Mariona Rebull (1947)
- Two Weeks with Love (1950)
- Excuse My Dust (1951)
- An American in Paris (1951)
- The Searchers (1956)

== Awards and nominations ==
=== Academy Awards ===
Year	Category	Film	Result	Ref.
1952	Best Cinematography	An American in Paris	Won	
