= Dorothy Arzner =

American film director and film editor (1897–1979)

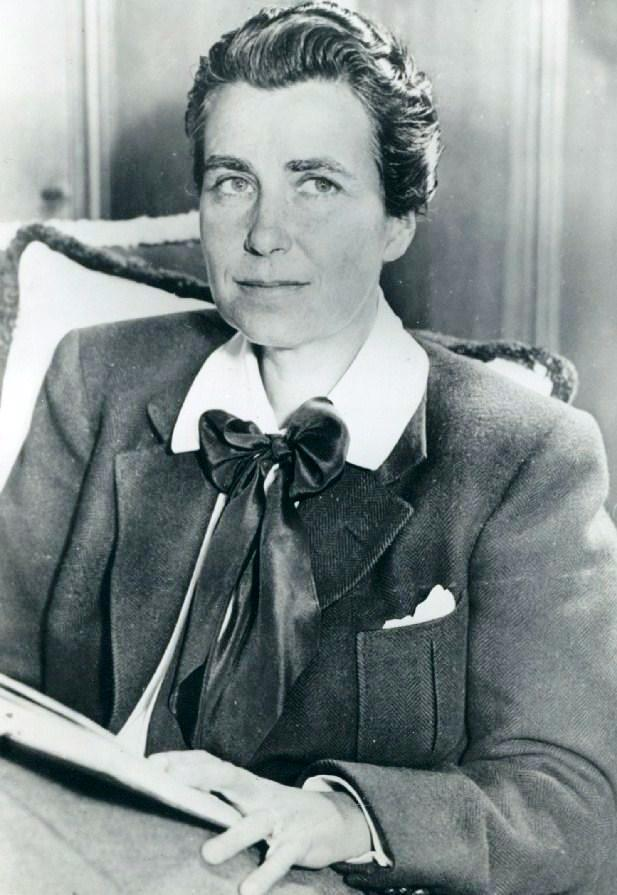
- Arzner in 1934
- Born: Dorothy Emma Arzner; January 3, 1897; San Francisco, California, U.S.
- Died: October 1, 1979 (aged 82); La Quinta, California, U.S.
- Occupation: Film director
- Years active: 1922–1943
- Partner: Marion Morgan (1927–1971; her death)

Dorothy Emma Arzner (January 3, 1897 – October 1, 1979) was an American film director whose career in Hollywood spanned from the silent era of the 1920s into the early 1940s. With the exception of long-time silent film director Lois Weber, Arzner was the only female director working in Hollywood from 1927 until her retirement from feature directing in 1943. She was one of a very few women able to establish a successful and long career in Hollywood as a film director until the 1970s. Arzner made a total of twenty films between 1927 and 1943 and launched the careers of a number of Hollywood actresses, including Katharine Hepburn, Rosalind Russell, and Lucille Ball. Arzner was the first woman to join the Directors Guild of America and the first woman to direct a sound film.

== Early life ==
Arzner was born in San Francisco, California, in 1897 to Jenetter (née Young) and Louis Arzner but grew up in Los Angeles, where her father owned the Hoffman Café, "a famous Hollywood restaurant next to a theatre". Her parents' restaurant was the first place Arzner came into contact with Hollywood elite; it was frequented by many silent film stars and directors, including Mary Pickford, Mack Sennett, and Douglas Fairbanks. After finishing high school at the Westlake School for Girls in Los Angeles, she enrolled at the University of Southern California, where she spent two years studying medicine with hopes of becoming a doctor. During World War I she joined a local Southern California ambulance unit. After spending a summer working in the office of a respected surgeon, however, Arzner decided that she did not want a career in medicine. "I wanted to be like Jesus," she said. "'Heal the sick and raise the dead,' instantly, without pills, surgery, etcetera."

== Career ==
=== Early career ===
After World War I the film industry was in need of workers. According to Arzner herself this was her opportunity to get a foot in the door. "It was possible for even inexperienced people to have an opportunity if they showed signs of ability or knowledge" she said in a 1974 interview published in Cinema. A girl friend from college suggested Arzner meet with William DeMille, a major director for Famous Players–Lasky Corporation, the parent company of Paramount. Arzner told the Sunday Star in 1929 that the friend thought she would be well suited to the industry. "Then she drove me over to the Paramount studio and dumped me out in front of the main office" she said.

When Arzner met with DeMille in 1919, he asked her in which department she would like to start working. "I might be able to dress sets," Arzner replied. After asking her a question about the furniture in his office that she did not know the answer to, DeMille suggested Arzner explore the different departments for a week and talk to his secretary. Arzner spent the week watching the sets at work, including that of Cecil DeMille, after which she made the observation "If one was going to be in this movie business, one should be a director because he was the one who told everyone else what to do."

At the recommendation of DeMille's secretary, Arzner decided to start in the script department, typing scripts so she could learn "what the film was to be all about." Within six months Arzner became an editor at a subsidiary of Paramount, Realart Studio, where she edited 52 films. In 1922, she was recalled to Paramount proper to edit the Rudolph Valentino film Blood and Sand (1922). This proved to be Arzner's opportunity to try her hand at directing. Although she went uncredited, Arzner shot some of the bull-fighting scenes for the film and edited this footage, intercutting it with stock footage, thereby saving Paramount thousands of dollars. Arzner's work on Blood and Sand caught the attention of director James Cruze who would later employ her as a writer and editor for a number of his films. According to Arzner, Cruze told people she was "his right arm." She eventually wrote the shooting script for and edited Cruze's Old Ironsides (1926).

Through her work with Cruze, Arzner gained considerable leverage and threatened to leave Paramount for Columbia if she was not given a picture to direct. "I had an offer to write and direct a film for Columbia," Arzner said, "It was then I closed out my salary at Paramount and was about to leave for Columbia." Before leaving, Arzner decided to say goodbye to "someone important and not just leave unnoticed and forgotten," which led her to Walter Wanger, the head of Paramount's New York studio. When she told Wanger she was leaving, he offered her a job in the scenario department and a discussion about directing some time in the future. Arzner replied, "Not unless I can be on a set in two weeks with an A picture. I'd rather do a picture for a small company and have my own way than a B picture for Paramount." Wanger then offered her a chance to direct a comedy based on the play The Best Dressed Woman in Paris, which would later be retitled Fashions for Women (1927). It became Arzner's first picture as a director.

Prior to Fashions for Women, Arzner had not directed anything. "In fact, I hadn't told anyone to do anything before," she said. The film starred Esther Ralston and was a commercial success. Arzner's success led Paramount to hire her as director for three more silent films, Ten Modern Commandments (1927), Get Your Man (1927), and Manhattan Cocktail (1928), after which she was entrusted to direct the studio's first talking picture, The Wild Party (1929), a remake of a silent film that Arzner had edited.

=== Directing career ===
Many of Dorothy Arzner's films had a similar theme of unconventional romance; The Wild Party is about a college student who is attracted to one of her teachers. Honor Among Lovers is about a businessman who is attracted to his secretary, who ends up marrying another, shadier man, which leads to a love triangle. Christopher Strong is a tale of illicit love among the English aristocracy, in which the title character, a married man, falls in love with another woman, after his daughter's boyfriend does the same. Craig's Wife is about a woman who marries the titular character for his money, though this eventually backfires when he has a run-in with the police. Dance, Girl, Dance is about two female dancers who fall for the same man and fight over him.

The Wild Party starred Clara Bow in her first talking picture and Fredric March in his first leading role. Because Bow found it awkward to move around the cumbersome sound equipment, Arzner had a rig made in which a microphone was attached to the end of a fishing rod, thus freeing Bow to move more easily. That invention was the first boom mic. The film, about a college girl, played by Bow, who leads a party lifestyle and falls for one of her professors, played by March, was a huge commercial and critical success. According to William S. Kenly, The Wild Party was such a success that it kicked off a series of films "set on college campuses where the fun-loving, hard-drinking students include coeds who fall in love with their professors."

After The Wild Party, Arzner directed more features for Paramount, including Sarah and Son (1930), starring Ruth Chatterton, and Honor Among Lovers (1931), starring Claudette Colbert, as well as two where she worked in tandem with director Robert Milton, Charming Sinners (1929) and Behind the Make-Up (1930), for which she was not credited. After 1932, she left the studio to work on a freelance basis. During her time freelancing, Arzner made some of her best-known films: Christopher Strong (1933), with Katharine Hepburn; Craig's Wife (1936), starring Rosalind Russell; and Dance, Girl, Dance (1940), featuring Lucille Ball. Arzner worked with RKO, United Artists, Columbia, and MGM during this time.

Christopher Strong follows a female aviator named Cynthia Darrington, played by Katharine Hepburn, who begins an affair with a married man, Christopher Strong. Towards the end of the film, Strong's wife, Elaine, appears both to acknowledge and forgive Cynthia for the affair. This plot is an example of the way Arzner turned conventional societal views of women upside-down. Instead of pitting the two women against each other, buying into the narrative of women as rivals, Arzner complicates and interrogates typical views of women by portraying a genuine moment of connection between Cynthia and Elaine. In an article for Jumpcut, Jane Gaines argues it's possible to read Christopher Strong as reflecting Arzner's belief that "heterosexual monogamy cripples the imagination and curbs the appetite for living." Arzner herself noted that the film was well-liked at the time but that she never considered it her favorite. "I could hardly consider any one a favorite," she said. "I always saw too many flaws."

Craig's Wife tells the story of Harriet Craig, played by Rosalind Russell, a woman so consumed by the upkeep of her home that nothing else interests her. The film was based on a stage play of the same name by George Kelly but differed in its treatment of its female protagonist. The play, in a much more misogynistic look at the American housewife, sided with Harriet's husband, portraying Harriet as cold and disinterested. Arzner's version turned the story into what So Mayer calls "a plea for women to become their own people rather than beautiful possessions." In her essay The Woman at the Keyhole: Women's Cinema and Feminist Criticism, Judith Mayne writes that "it is Harriet's husband who married for love, not money" whereas Harriet approached the marriage as "a business contract." In this way, Craig's Wife is an example of a running theme in Arzner's work: the repressiveness of heterosexual marriage. Mayer writes that Arzner's films "show again and again that when a man believes he can own a woman and women have to compete for men, then romance, loyalty and friendship go out the window." In Craig's Wife, Arzner offers the possibility of women's community after the instability of heterosexual romance with a final scene between Harriet and her widowed next door neighbor. Both women have been left by their husbands, in vastly different ways, and their next potentially meaningful connection is with each other.

Dance, Girl, Dance is one of Arzner's most celebrated films. Described by Variety as "an unlikely-female-buddy burlesque movie that conceals a withering attack on the male gaze under its showgirl wardrobe of sequins and feathers," the film starred Lucille Ball and Maureen O'Hara as a pair of showgirl best friends. Dance, Girl, Dance is yet another example of the ways in which Arzner subverted and complicated traditional depictions of women and female-female relationships. The film is Arzner's best-known and most studied work and thematizes the issues of female performance, female-female relationships, and social mobility. Most notable, though, is the film's interrogation of the male gaze. As Teresa Geller writes, Dance, Girl, Dance "foregrounds dance as women's avenue to self-expression and economic independence." In a scene in the latter half of the film, O'Hara's character, Judy, stops her stage performance to directly address the male audience watching her act. Judy confronts the men with a stirring admonishment of their objectification of women. In feminist film studies, this scene has been read as a "returning" of the male gaze and a larger address to the real-life audience, not just the diegetic audience within the film.

=== Later career ===
In 1943, after making First Comes Courage (1943), Arzner retired from Hollywood. Though her reasons for retirement are not known, it is speculated that it was due to a decline in the critical and commercial performance of her films. It could also have been due to the increase in sexism and anti-gay bigotry that followed the implementation of the Hays Code. Despite leaving Hollywood, Arzner continued to work in the field of film. She made Women's Army Corps training films during World War II.

In 1950, Arzner became associated with the Pasadena Playhouse, a well-known theatre company in southern California, where she founded film-making classes. She produced some plays and starred in a radio program called You Wanna Be a Star. In 1952, she joined the staff of the College of the Arts of the Playhouse as the head of the Cinema and Television Department. She taught first-year courses in cinema at the university. In the late fifties, she became the entertainment and publicity consultant at the Pepsi-Cola Company, with the influence of her friend Joan Crawford, who was married to Pepsi president Alfred Steele. Arzner made a series of successful commercials for Pepsi, most of them with Crawford.

In 1961, Arzner joined the UCLA School of Theater, Film and Television, in the Motion Picture division as a staff member, where she spent four years supervising advanced cinema classes before retiring in June 1965. There she taught Francis Ford Coppola and became an influence on his later work. Arzner's documents, files and films are preserved in Cinema and Television File in UCLA, thanks to Jodie Foster, who raised sufficient funds for their maintenance.

== Personal life and death ==
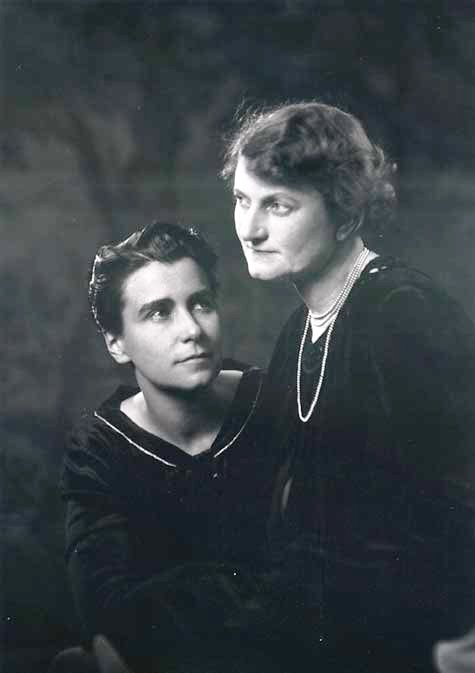
Arzner with Marion Morgan, 1927, photo by Arnold Genthe

Arzner would maintain a forty-year relationship with Marion Morgan, a dancer and choreographer who was sixteen years older than Arzner. Morgan choreographed some dancing sequences in some of Arzner's movies, such as Dance, Girl, Dance. Even though she tried to keep her private life as private as possible, Arzner was linked romantically with a number of actresses, including Alla Nazimova and Billie Burke. It was rumored, though never confirmed, that Arzner also had relationships with Joan Crawford and Katharine Hepburn. Her clothing was unconventional for a woman of that time, as she often wore suits.

In 1930, Arzner and Morgan moved to Mountain Oak Drive, where they lived until Morgan's death in 1971. While they lived in Hollywood, Arzner assisted various cinematographic events. In her last years, Arzner left Hollywood and went to live in the desert. In 1979, at the age of 82, Arzner died in La Quinta, California from complications ensuing from a car accident.

== Legacy ==
Arzner's work, as both a female and gay film-maker, has been an important area of film studies. Perhaps due to her leave from Hollywood in the 1940s, much of her work was all but forgotten until the 1970s, when she was rediscovered by feminist film theorists. Arzner's films inspired some of the earliest forms of feminist film criticism, including Claire Johnston's landmark 1973 essay, "Women's Cinema as Counter-Cinema". Arzner's films are notable for the depictions of women's relationships, with Arnzer typically reversing societal expectations of women, allowing them to find solidarity with one another. In addition to this, many of her films, such as Working Girls (1931), analyze the role of traditional femininity in women's lives, often criticizing the importance society places on it.

Since the resurgence of Arzner's films, they have been studied by feminist and gay theorists alike for their depictions of gender and female sexuality, as well as for Arzner's focus on the female relationship.

== Tributes ==
For her achievements in the field of motion pictures, Arzner was awarded a star on the Hollywood Walk of Fame at 1500 Vine Street, the only award she received.

In 1972, the First International Festival of Women's Films honored her by screening "The Wild Party", and her oeuvre was given a full retrospective at the Second Festival in 1976. In 1975, the Directors Guild of America honored her with "A Tribute to Dorothy Arzner." During the tribute, a telegram from Katharine Hepburn was read: "Isn't it wonderful that you've had such a great career, when you had no right to have a career at all?"

In March 2018, Paramount dedicated its Dressing Room building to Arzner.

In February 2025, an LGBTQ+ cinema opened in Bermondsey, London called 'The Arzner'.

== In popular culture ==
R.M. Vaughan's 2000 play, Camera, Woman depicts the last day of Arzner's career. In the play, Harry Cohn fires her over a kissing scene between Merle Oberon and fictitious actor Rose Lindstrom – the name of a character played by Isobel Elsom in Arzner's last film, First Comes Courage, in which Oberon starred – in a never-completed final film. The play also depicts Arzner and Oberon as lovers. It is told in a prologue, four acts, and an epilogue in the form of a post-show interview that contains actual quotations from Arzner.

S. Louisa Wei's 2014 feature documentary, Golden Gate Girls, compares the news media representation of Arzner with that of Esther Eng, Hong Kong's first female director who was a Chinese American. Judith Mayne, the author of Directed by Dorothy Arzner, is interviewed in the documentary, saying, "I love the fact that history of woman filmmakers now would include Dorothy Arzner and Esther Eng as two of the real exceptions, who proved it was entirely possible to build a successful film career without necessarily being a part of mainstream identity."

In the 2022 film Babylon, which portrays a fictionalized, exaggerated version of 1920s Hollywood, the character of director Ruth Adler is mainly inspired by Arzner and her collaborations with Clara Bow.

== Filmography ==
Year	Title	Role	Notes
1943	First Comes Courage	Director	
1940	Dance, Girl, Dance	Director	
1937	The Bride Wore Red	Director	
1937	The Last of Mrs. Cheyney	Director	Uncredited
1936	Craig's Wife	Director	
1934	Nana	Co-Director	
1933	Christopher Strong	Director	
1932	Merrily We Go to Hell	Director	
1931	Working Girls	Director	
1931	Honor Among Lovers	Director	
1931	The House That Shadows Built		Paramount promotional film with excerpt of never-produced film Stepdaughters of War to be directed by Arzner
1930	Anybody's Woman	Director	
1930	Paramount on Parade	Co-Director	
1930	Sarah and Son	Director	
1930	Behind the Make-Up	Co-Director	Uncredited
1929	Charming Sinners	Co-Director	Uncredited
1929	The Wild Party	Director	
1928	Manhattan Cocktail	Director	lost, except for the montage sequence by Slavko Vorkapić released in 2005 on DVD Unseen Cinema
1927	Get Your Man	Director	Missing two of six reels
1927	Ten Modern Commandments	Director, Writer	Lost
1927	Fashions for Women	Director	Lost
1924	Inez from Hollywood	Editor	Lost
1923	The Covered Wagon	Editor	
1922	Blood and Sand	Additional Footage	Uncredited
1920	The Six Best Cellars	Editor	Lost
1919	Too Much Johnson	Editor	Lost

== See also ==
- Female gaze
- Feminism
- List of female film and television directors
- List of lesbian filmmakers
- List of LGBT-related films directed by women
- Women's Cinema
