= Ten Modern Commandments =

1927 film

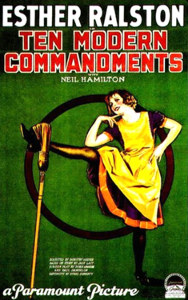
- Directed by: Dorothy Arzner
- Written by: Dorothy Arzner; Paul Gangelin; George Marion, Jr. (titles)
- Story by: Jack Lait
- Starring: Esther Ralston; Neil Hamilton
- Cinematography: Alfred Gilks
- Edited by: Louis D. Lighton
- Distributed by: Paramount Pictures
- Release date: July 27, 1927 (United States)
- Running time: 70 minutes
- Country: United States
- Languages: Silent; English intertitles

Ten Modern Commandments is a lost 1927 American silent romantic comedy-drama film that starred Esther Ralston and was distributed through Paramount Pictures. It is based on an original screen story and was directed by Dorothy Arzner.

== Cast ==
- Esther Ralston as Kitten O'Day
- Neil Hamilton as Tod Gilbert
- Maude Truax as Aunt Ruby
- Romaine Fielding as Zeno
- El Brendel as 'Speeding' Shapiro
- Rose Burdick as Belle
- Jocelyn Lee as Sharon Lee
- Arthur Hoyt as Disbrow
- Roscoe Karns as Benny

== Preservation status ==
With no holdings located in archives, Ten Modern Commandments is considered a lost film.
