= Goin' to Town =

1935 film by Alexander Hall

Goin' To Town
- Theatrical poster
- Directed by: Alexander Hall
- Screenplay by: Mae West
- Story by: Marion Morgan; George B. Dowell
- Produced by: William LeBaron
- Starring: Mae West; Paul Cavanagh; Gilbert Emery; Marjorie Gateson; Tito Coral; Ivan Lebedeff
- Cinematography: Karl Struss
- Edited by: LeRoy Stone
- Music by: Sammy Fain
- Distributed by: Paramount Pictures
- Release date: April 25, 1935
- Running time: 74 minutes
- Country: United States
- Language: English

Goin' To Town is a 1935 musical comedy film directed by Alexander Hall and written by Mae West. The film stars Mae West, Paul Cavanagh, Gilbert Emery, Marjorie Gateson, Tito Coral, and Ivan Lebedeff. The film was released on April 25, 1935, by Paramount Pictures.

== Production ==
In the film, star Mae West used her own voice, prompting Mordaunt Hall to state the following in his review: "The highlight of the picture is Miss West singing high opera (really!)."

West was already the highest paid actress in Hollywood when Goin' To Town was released, and her bold, controversial performances and bawdy, irreverent humor had made her a popular figure in Hollywood's pre-Code era. In Goin' To Town, she brings all of these qualities to the role of Cleo Borden, delivering a memorable and entertaining performance that has helped to make the film a classic of its time.

The film was a box office success upon its release and received generally positive reviews from critics, who praised its humor and West's performance. In the years since its release, Goin' To Town has continued to be remembered and enjoyed by audiences, and it remains a popular choice for fans of classic Hollywood cinema. The original title of the film was "Now I'm A Lady", but the Hays office mandated the title change just before the film was released. Miss West's pet monkey, "Boogie", makes a cameo in the film. A musical number, "Love is Love in any Woman's Heart", was cut from the film at the star's request, as she felt it was not in line with her character. The song is still used over the closing titles.

== Plot ==
Cleo Borden (West) is a saloon singer out west whose cattle rustling boyfriend (Fred Kohler) dies right before their wedding day (in which they signed a paper agreeing to marry) and leaves her a fortune. She sets her sights on a handsome Brit in Carrington (Paul Cavanaugh), employed surveying the oil wells on her property and spends the rest of the picture trying to win him over, having placed a bet on it. He considers her "Crude oil", which leads to West stating her desire to "become a lady if it kills me!" Part of her quest includes throwing an opera and singing the lead in a scene from Samson and Delilah.

It also takes her to Buenos Aires, where she meets Ivan Valadov, a Russian millionaire with a mistress in Mrs. Crane Brittony. Brittony and Borden make a bet over which of their horses will win a race, which Borden wins. Later, Fletcher Colton (the niece of Brittony) offers her a title, and thus a place in society, in a loveless marriage in Southampton. Carrington returns to see her, now with a new title: the Earl of Stratton. Brittany schemes to embarrass Borden, and end her nephew's marriage to Borden, but in so doing causes his death, as Colton shoots himself in a scuffle with paid sneak Valadov. Initially, it looks like Borden will be blamed, but she is exonerated, and left free to marry Carrington. The film's happy ending ends with a briefcase listing "Lord and Lady Stratton".

== Cast ==
- Mae West as Cleo Borden
- Paul Cavanagh as Edward Carrington
- Gilbert Emery as Winslow
- Marjorie Gateson as Mrs. Crane Brittony
- Tito Coral as Taho
- Ivan Lebedeff as Ivan Valadov
- Fred Kohler as Buck Gonzales
- Monroe Owsley as Fletcher Colton
- Grant Withers as Young Stud
- Luis Alberni as Sr. Vitola
- Lucio Villegas as Señor Ricardo Lopez
- Mona Rico as Dolores Lopez
- Wade Boteler as Ranch foreman
- Paul Harvey as Donovan
- Joe Frye as Laughing Eagle
- Vladimar Bykoff as Tenor
