= Jocelyn Lee (actress) =

American actress (1902–1980)

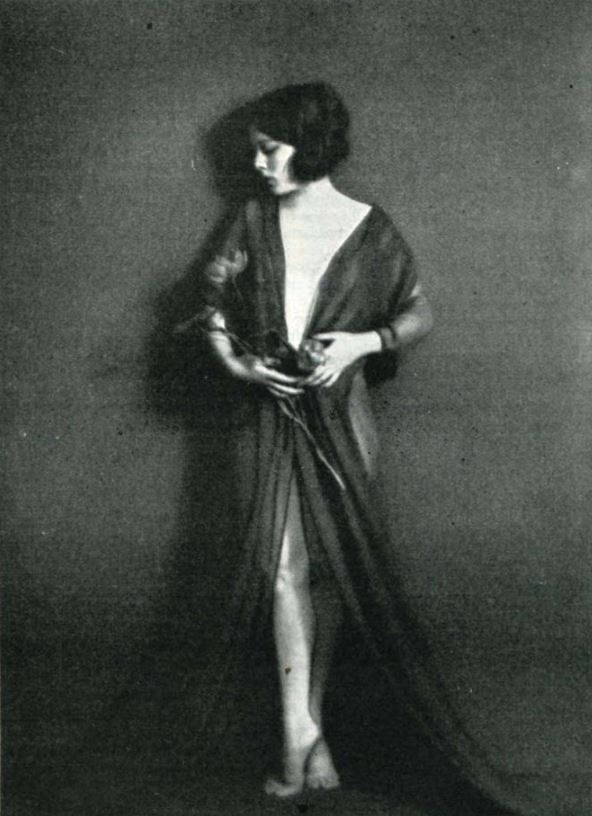
- Lee in 1922
- Born: Mary Alice Simpson; June 21, 1902; Chicago, Illinois, U.S.
- Died: June 15, 1980 (aged 77); New York City, U.S.
- Other name: Jocelyn Leigh
- Occupation: Actress
- Spouses: Henry Lehrman (m. 1922; div. 1924) Luther Reed (m. 1930; div. 1931) James Seymour (m. 1935; died 1976)

Jocelyn Lee (born Mary Alice Simpson; June 21, 1902 – June 15, 1980) was an American actress. She was also known as Jocelyn Leigh.

== Biography ==
Jocelyn Lee was born on June 21, 1902, in Chicago, Illinois, as Mary Alice Simpson. She died on June 15, 1980, in New York City. She performed in the Ziegfeld Follies.

== Personal life ==
On April 27, 1922, Lee married film producer Henry Lehrman in Los Angeles. They were divorced on December 16, 1924. She later married director and writer Luther Reed; they were divorced on April 3, 1931. In January 1935, Lee married associate producer James Seymour.

== Partial filmography ==
- The Dressmaker from Paris (1925)
- Paris at Midnight (1926)
- Sunny Side Up (1926)
- The Campus Flirt (1926)
- Everybody's Acting (1926)
- A Kiss in a Taxi (1927)
- Afraid to Love (1927)
- The Love Thrill (1927)
- Say It with Diamonds (1927)
- Ten Modern Commandments (1927)
- Shanghai Bound (1927)
- Backstage (1927)
- The Masked Angel (1928)
- The Night Bird (1928)
- Dry Martini (1928)
- Broadway Babies (1929)
- Twin Beds (1929)
- The Love Trap (1929)
- Three Live Ghosts (1929)
- Young Nowheres (1929)
- The Marriage Playground (1929)
- No, No, Nanette (1930)
- Her First Mate (1933)
