= Horse Shoes (1927 film) =

1927 film directed by Clyde Bruckman

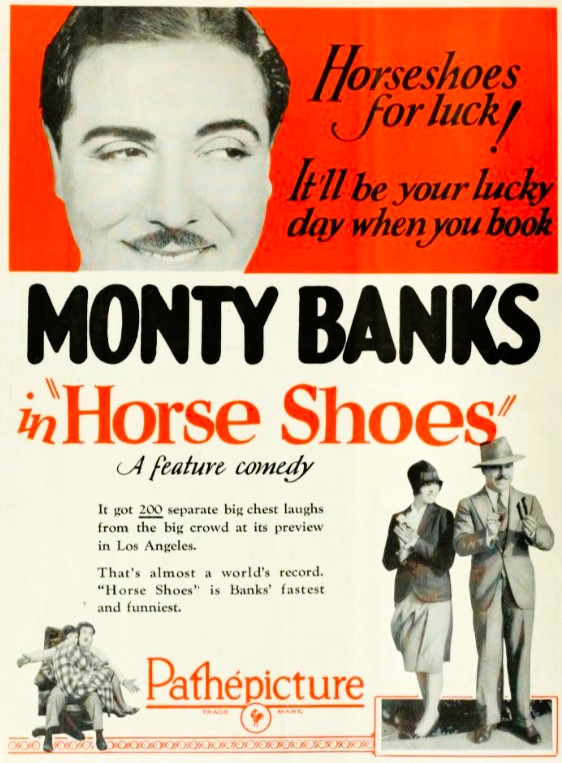
- Advertisement
- Directed by: Clyde Bruckman
- Written by: Monty Banks; Charles Horan
- Produced by: A. MacArthur
- Starring: Monty Banks; Jean Arthur
- Cinematography: James Diamond
- Production company: Monty Banks Enterprises
- Distributed by: Pathé Exchange
- Release date: April 17, 1927 (US)
- Running time: 6 reels
- Country: United States
- Language: Silent (English intertitles)

Horse Shoes is a 1927 American silent comedy film directed by Clyde Bruckman. Released by Pathé Exchange, the film stars Monty Banks and Jean Arthur. In 1928 it was given a German release by Bavaria Film.

== Cast list ==
- Monty Banks as Monty Milde
- Ernie Wood as Henry Baker Jr.
- Henry Barrows as Henry Baker Sr.
- John Elliott as William Baker
- Jean Arthur as His daughter
- Arthur Thalasso as Conductor
- George French as Mayor
- Agostino Borgato as Judge
- Bert Apling as O'Toole

== Preservation ==
Prints of Horse Shoes are located in the UCLA Film and Television Archive, Cinemateket-Svenska Filminstitutet in Stockholm, and Gosfilmofond in Moscow.
