= Agostino Borgato =

Italian actor and film director

- Born: June 30, 1871; Venice, Italy
- Died: March 14, 1939 (aged 67); Hollywood, California, United States
- Occupation: Actor
- Years active: 1915–1939

Agostino Borgato (June 30, 1871 – March 14, 1939), sometimes known as Al Borgato, was an Italian actor and director, before moving to Hollywood in the mid-1920s. Borgato acted and/or directed about fifteen films in his native Italy between 1915 and 1922. In the 1920s, he also acted on the stage in both Italy and England. In 1925 Borgato immigrated to the United States, where he began his American acting career in Herbert Brenon's silent film, The Street of Forgotten Men.

His Hollywood career would last fourteen years, during which time he would appear in 45 films (although some sources have him in as many as 62 films), having roles in such classic films as 1932's Murders in the Rue Morgue (starring Bela Lugosi, and the 1939 musical comedy version of The Three Musketeers (starring Don Ameche and The Ritz Brothers).

His distinctive features and voice resulted from acromegaly. The Three Musketeers and Hotel Imperial were the last two films he worked on, and both were released on the same day, February 17, 1939, less than a month before Borgato would die of a heart attack on March 14.

== Filmography ==
=== In Italy ===
(Per MoviesPictures.org)

- L'ultimo cavaliere (1915) - actor
- Estremo convegno (1915) - actor
- The Sinful Woman (1916) - actor
- Il vetturale del Moncenisio (1916) - actor
- Buon sangue non mente (1916) - actor
- Uragano (1918) - actor
- Supremo olocausto (1918) - director
- S.M il Danaro (1919) - director
- S.A. l'Amore (1919) - director
- Il cuore di Musette (1919) - director
- Il ponte dei sospiri (1921) - actor
- Il figlio (1921) - actor, director
- Il trionfo di Ercole (1922) - actor

=== In the United States ===
(Per AFI database)

- The Street of Forgotten Men (1925)
- Kiki (1926)
- The Love Thief (1926)
- The Show (1927)
- A Kiss in a Taxi (1927)
- Fashions for Women (1927)
- Horse Shoes (1927)
- Hula (1927)
- The Magic Flame (1927)
- The Private Life of Helen of Troy (1927)
- A Perfect Gentleman (1928)
- Romance of the Rio Grande (1929)
- Hot for Paris (1929)
- La voluntad del muerto (1930)
- Behind the Make-Up (1930)
- The Maltese Falcon (1931)
- Transgression (1931)
- Il grande sentiero (1931)
- Murders in the Rue Morgue (1932)
- Bird of Paradise (1932)
- Primavera en otoño (1933)
- Forbidden Melody (1933)
- Christopher Strong (1933)
- Marie Galante (1934)
- Now and Forever (1934)
- All Men Are Enemies (1934) (uncredited)
- Julieta compra un hijo (1935)
- In Caliente (1935)
- Mad Love (1935)
- The Gay Deception (1935)
- Till We Meet Again (1936)
- Wives Never Know (1936)
- Rose-Marie (1936)
- Love on the Run (1936)
- Man of the People (1937) (uncredited)
- El capitán Tormenta (1937)
- Internes Can't Take Money (1937)
- Lloyd's of London (1937)
- Maytime (1937)
- The Firefly (1937)
- The Bride Wore Red (1937)
- Love Under Fire (1937)
- The Emperor's Candlesticks (1937)
- Daughter of Shanghai (1938)
- A Trip to Paris (1938) (uncredited)
- Swiss Miss (1938)
- Flight into Nowhere (1938)
- Hotel Imperial (1939)
- The Three Musketeers (1939)
