= The Blind Goddess (1926 film) =

1926 film

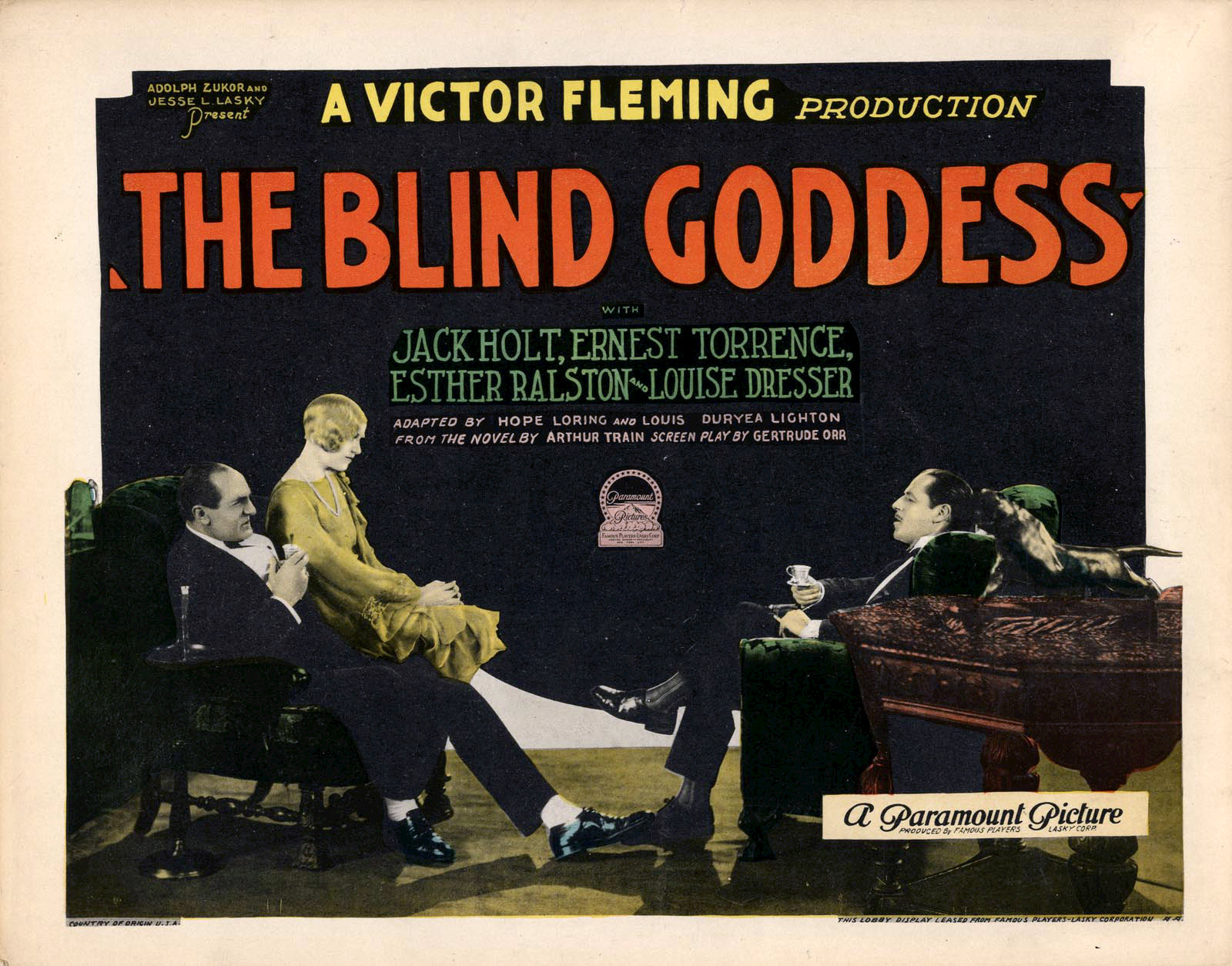
- Lobby card
- Directed by: Victor Fleming
- Written by: Louis Duryea Lighton (scenario); Hope Loring (scenario); Gertrude Orr (adaptation)
- Based on: The Blind Goddess by Arthur Cheney Train
- Produced by: Adolph Zukor; Jesse Lasky
- Starring: Jack Holt; Ernest Torrence; Esther Ralston; Louise Dresser
- Cinematography: Alfred Gilks
- Distributed by: Paramount Pictures
- Release date: April 4, 1926
- Running time: 80 min.; 8 reels
- Country: United States
- Language: Silent (English intertitles)

The Blind Goddess is a 1926 American silent mystery film directed by Victor Fleming. It was produced by Famous Players–Lasky and released by Paramount Pictures. The film is based on the novel The Blind Goddess by Arthur Cheney Train.

== Plot ==
As described in a film magazine review, the daughter of a politician is in love with a young attorney. The father’s happiness ends with the appearance of his wife, who had deserted him, but now returns to see her daughter. The father pleads with her to go, as he has built up an ideal of her for his daughter. The wife leaves and while exiting is seen by the daughter, who does not know her. Immediately after this the father’s business partner comes in and admits to being mixed in several crooked deals in which he has implicated them both — and during a quarrel kills the father. The daughter believes the woman that she saw leaving is guilty and she is arrested. She does not reveal her identity, but tells her story to the young lawyer, who originally was the prosecuting attorney, and who, while reconstructing the murder, turns on the dictaphone, into which the father spoke before he died. The lawyer changes to the defense and wins an acquittal. Mother and daughter are reunited.

== Cast ==
- Jack Holt as Hugh Dillon
- Esther Ralston as Moira Devens
- Ernest Torrence as 'Big Bill' Devens
- Louise Dresser as Mrs. Eileen Clayton
- Ward Crane as Tracy Redmond
- Richard Tucker as Henry Kelling
- Louis Payne as Taylor
- Charles Clary as District Attorney
- Erwin Connelly as Chief of detectives
- Charles Lane as Judge
- Vondell Darr as Young Girl (uncredited)

== Preservation ==
With no prints of The Blind Goddess located in any film archives, it is a lost film.
