= The Masked Woman =

1927 film

- Lobby card
- Directed by: Silvano Balboni
- Written by: June Mathis (scenario); Gerald C. Duffy (intertitles)
- Based on: La Femme Masquee (1923) by Charles Méré
- Produced by: First National Pictures
- Starring: Anna Q. Nilsson; Holbrook Blinn; Ruth Roland
- Cinematography: John W. Boyle
- Edited by: George McGuire
- Distributed by: First National Pictures
- Release date: January 16, 1927
- Running time: 6 reels, 5442 ft.
- Country: United States
- Language: Silent (English intertitles)

The Masked Woman is a 1927 American silent melodrama film produced and distributed by First National Pictures. Filmed in France, it was the last screenwriting effort of famed June Mathis, who died in 1927, and was directed by her husband Silvano Balboni, who was usually a cinematographer. The film stars Anna Q. Nilsson, Holbrook Blinn, and serial veteran Ruth Roland.

== Cast ==
- Anna Q. Nilsson as Diane Delatour
- Holbrook Blinn as Baron Tolento
- Einar Hanson as Dr. Rene Delatour (credited as Einar Hansen)
- Charlie Murray as Andre O'Donohue
- Gertrude Short as Mimi
- Ruth Roland as Dolly Green
- R. O. Pennell as Monsieur Lapoule (credited as Richard Pennell)
- Cora Macey as Matron
- Paulette Day as Baby
- Marion Morgan Dancers in the Indian Jazz Ballet (uncredited)
- Jewel Richford as Dancer (uncredited)

== Preservation ==
With no prints of The Masked Woman located in any film archives, it is a lost film.
