= A Kiss in a Taxi =

1927 film directed by Clarence Badger

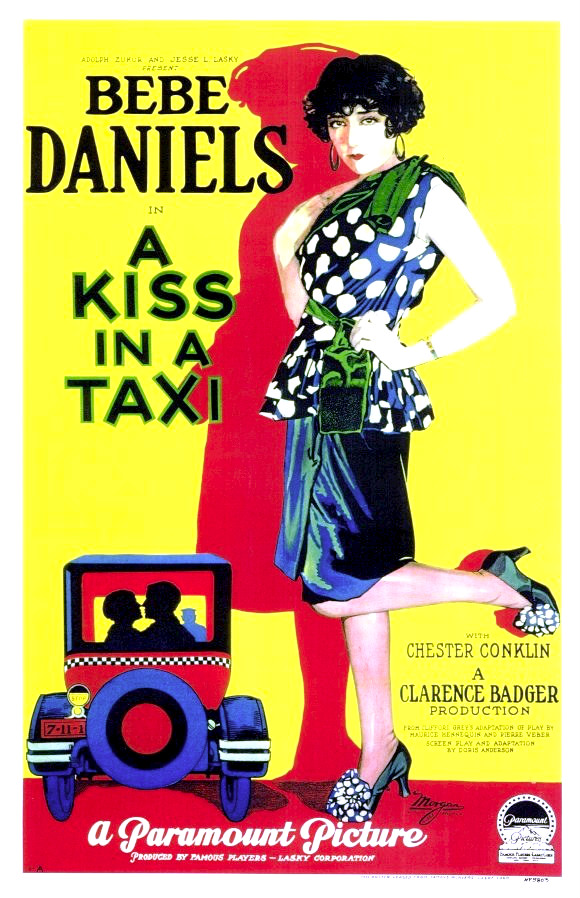
- Film poster
- Directed by: Clarence Badger
- Written by: Clifford Grey (American adaptation); Doris Anderson (scenario); George Marion, Jr. (titles)
- Based on: Le Monsieur de cinq heures by Maurice Hennequin and Pierre Veber
- Produced by: Adolph Zukor; Jesse Lasky
- Starring: Bebe Daniels
- Cinematography: H. Kinley Martin
- Distributed by: Paramount Pictures
- Release date: February 22, 1927
- Running time: 70 minutes
- Country: United States
- Language: Silent (English intertitles)

A Kiss in a Taxi is a 1927 American silent comedy film starring Bebe Daniels and directed by Clarence Badger. It is based on a French play, A Kiss in a Taxi, produced on Broadway in 1925. Famous Players–Lasky produced and Paramount Pictures distributed the film.

== Plot ==
Ginette, a waitress at Pierre's Café, is in love with a poor artist named Lucien despite Lucien's father's disapproval of their relationship, and rejects the affection of all other men. Whenever another man tries to kiss her she begins angrily breaking glassware. Patrons of the café find this behavior very amusing. A patron of the café named Leon Lambert decides to make an attempt to kiss Ginette.

Leon Lambert and "a gay lady" are traveling through town by taxi when they decide to stop at a florists shop. At the same time Ginette, in an attempt to get away from her irate employer, runs down the street and into the waiting taxi. Leon returns to the taxi and offers a bouquet of flowers to Ginette. With the taxi leaving the florist Leon attempts to force a kiss on Ginnette. In response Ginette strikes Leon in the face. This commotion causes the cab driver to lose control of uthe taxi and crash through the front window of the café. Leon Lambert offers to buy the café for Ginette, expecting her gratitude. He accidentally uses the card of Maraval, a treasurer for the Artists' Society. To get out of the situation Leon poses as Ginettes father and with the help of his friend Henri attempts to make Maravel pursue Ginette as a lover. After all complications are resolved Ginette and Lucien finally reunite and are able to be together.

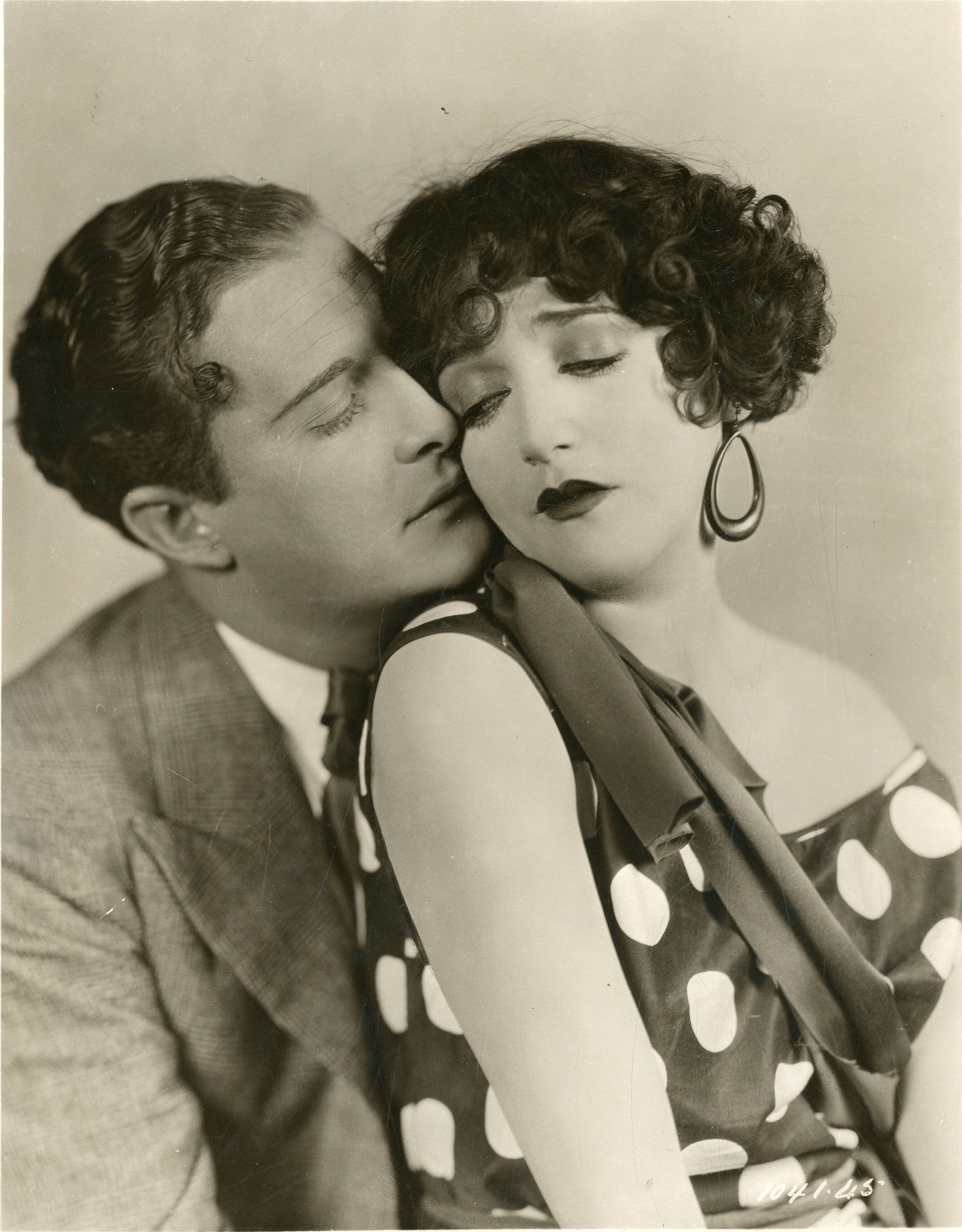
A Kiss in a Taxi publicity still with Bebe Daniels and Douglas Gilmore

== Cast ==
- Bebe Daniels as Ginette
- Chester Conklin as Maraval
- Douglas Gilmore as Lucien Cambolle
- Henry Kolker as Leon Lambert
- Richard Tucker as Henri Le Sage
- Agostino Borgato as Pierre
- Eulalie Jensen as Valentine Lambert
- Rose Burdick as Gay Lady
- Jocelyn Lee as Secretary

== Reception ==
A Kiss In A Taxi received generally positive reviews from critics upon its release. Much of this praise was directed to the performances of its cast. In The Healdsburg Tribune it was stated of Bebe Daniels in the role of Ginette. "The dark eyed star presents one of the best characterizations of her career". The same article said "Brilliant support is accorded by Chester Conklin, Douglas Gilmore, her new leading man, Jocelyn Lee, Henry Kolker and Richard Tucker". The humor of the movie received attention from reviewers, namely the large amounts of glassware shattered throughout the movie for comedic effect. The movie also received praise for its more action filled moments, The Healdsburg Tribune stated referring to the scene of the taxi crashing through the café wall "This brief action represents one of the most exciting bits of screen photography ever recorded".

== Preservation ==
With no prints of A Kiss in a Taxi located in any film archives, it is a lost film.
