= First Comes Courage =

1943 film by Dorothy Arzner, Charles Vidor

- theatrical poster
- Directed by: Dorothy Arzner
- Written by: George Sklar; Melvin Levy; Lewis Meltzer
- Based on: Commandos, novel by Elliott Arnold
- Produced by: Harry Joe Brown
- Starring: Merle Oberon; Brian Aherne
- Cinematography: Joseph Walker
- Edited by: Viola Lawrence
- Music by: Ernst Toch
- Production company: Columbia Pictures
- Distributed by: Columbia Pictures
- Release date: July 29, 1943
- Running time: 88 minutes
- Country: United States
- Language: English

First Comes Courage is a 1943 American war film, the final film directed by Dorothy Arzner, one of the few female directors in Hollywood at the time. The film was based on the 1943 novel Commandos by Elliott Arnold, adapted by George Sklar, with a screenplay by Melvin Levy and Lewis Meltzer. It stars Merle Oberon and Brian Aherne.

== Plot ==
In 1942, in occupied Norway, Nicole Larsen is a member of the resistance in the town of Stavik. Nicole pretends to be in love with Major Paul Dichter, the Nazi commandant of the district. Through their intimacy she picks up military intelligence, which she passes on to the British by way of optometrist Dr. Henrik Aanrud.

The high number of successful raids in the district does not go unnoticed by the Nazis. Colonel Kurt von Elser pressures Dichter to find the source of intelligence leaks, and Nicole feels she is under suspicion. She alerts Aanrud, who conceals a message on an eyeglass requesting that the British send an assassin to kill Dichter. His death offers the only safe way out for Nicole.

The British have planned a commando raid on the oil dumps in Stavik. Dichter is to appear to be a casualty of the raid, so that there will be no reprisals against the locals. Captain Allan Lowell, who was Nicole's lover before the war, volunteers to go to Stavik a few days early to arrange Dichter's assassination.

Allan and Ole, a Norwegian commando based in England, land on the coast via submarine and fishing boat. They shelter in the farmhouse of Ole's cousin Thorsten, but he betrays them to the Nazis. Ole is killed and Allan is injured and captured.

Before he is well enough to be interrogated, Allan escapes from the hospital with the help of Nicole and nurse Rose Lindstrom, and hides in Nicole's basement. When Major Dichter orders a search of the town, Colonel von Elser questions why Nicole's house is exempt. He backs off when Dichter announces their imminent marriage.

This comes as news to Nicole, but she promptly accepts, and at Dichter's insistence the wedding is set for later that week. Believing that as Dichter's wife she will be protected and more useful than ever, Nicole asks Allan to call off the assassination. As planned, Allan will rendezvous with his unit on the night of the raid, which happens to coincide with the wedding.

Moments before the ceremony, Dichter receives information that implicates Nicole. His career would be ruined if this got out, so he goes through with the wedding, but intends to arrange her death in what will look like an automobile accident on their marriage trip.

After the ceremony, Dichter drives Nicole home for a change of clothes. He confronts her and she admits to spying. At last she can reveal her true feelings, that he is weak and she loathes him. Before Dichter can kill her, Allan shoots him dead.

Allan and Nicole load Dichter's body into his car and set off to join the raid. As they are leaving, von Elser drives up with soldiers—he was expecting Nicole and Dichter to be on their way, and has come to search her house. Seeing Dichter's car pull away, with Allan driving, he gives chase.

The road leads by the oil dumps that the commandos have come to blow up. Allan and Nicole get past seconds before the explosions, but von Elser and his men are killed in the blast.

Believing that she will be useful to the resistance as Dichter's widow, Nicole chooses to remain in Stavik. Allan returns to England with his unit, hoping to return some day.

== Cast ==
- Merle Oberon as Nicole Larsen
- Brian Aherne as Capt. Allan Lowell
- Carl Esmond as Maj. Paul Dichter
- Isobel Elsom as Rose Lindstrom
- Fritz Leiber as Dr. Aanrud
- Erville Alderson as Soren
- Erik Rolf as Ole
- Reinhold Schünzel as Col. Kurt von Elser
- Byron Foulger as shopkeeper (uncredited)
- Miles Mander as Col. Wallace (uncredited)
- Larry Parks as Capt. Langdon (uncredited)

== Production ==
First Comes Courage had the working title of "Attack by Night". The film was originally to have been set in France, but was changed to Norway because of the public's interest at the time in the occupation of that country.

When director Dorothy Arzner had an attack of pleurisy, she was replaced by Charles Vidor. The film would turn out to be Arzner's final film.

Some scenes were filmed on Vancouver Island, British Columbia, with military units providing extras for the scenes of the commando attack.

Oberon and Aherne had played the leads in Beloved Enemy in 1936, with David Niven in a large supporting role.
