= Klondike Annie =

1936 film by Raoul Walsh

- Directed by: Raoul Walsh
- Written by: Mae West; Marion Morgan and George Brendan Dowell
- Produced by: William LeBaron
- Starring: Mae West; Victor McLaglen
- Cinematography: George T. Clemens
- Edited by: Stuart Heisler
- Music by: Victor Young
- Color process: Black and white
- Distributed by: Paramount Pictures
- Release date: February 21, 1936
- Running time: 80 minutes
- Country: United States
- Language: English

Klondike Annie is a 1936 American Western film starring Mae West and Victor McLaglen. The film was co-written by West from her play Frisco Kate, which she wrote in 1921 and a story written by the duo Marion Morgan and George Brendan Dowell. Raoul Walsh directed.

== Plot ==
Mae West portrays a kept woman by the name of Rose Carlton, "The Frisco Doll". She murders her keeper Chan Lo in self-defense and escapes on a steamer to Nome, Alaska, wanted for murder. She is joined mid-voyage by a missionary, Sister Annie Alden. Sister Annie is on her way to rescue a financially troubled mission in Nome, and inspires Rose, but dies en route. Rose assumes the identity of Sister Annie to avoid arrest, dressing her as a prostitute in a scene later deleted by the censors.

The Frisco Doll decides to keep Sister Annie's promise of rescuing the mission and raises the money by combining soul-shaking sermon and song with street smarts. She's romanced both by a beautiful young Sheriff being generally investigative, and the blustering, slightly crazy ship's captain, Bull Brackett. Klondike Annie/Rose Carlton/The Frisco doll knows in the end to turn herself in and prove her innocence by way of self-defense. Steaming back to San Francisco with Captain Brackett -- "Bull, ya ain't no oil paintin', but ya are a fascinatin' monster".

== Cast ==
- Mae West as The Frisco Doll / Rose Carlton / Sister Annie Alden
- Victor McLaglen as Bull Brackett
- Phillip Reed as Insp. Jack Forrest
- Helen Jerome Eddy as Sister Annie Alden
- Harry Beresford as Brother Bowser
- Harold Huber as Chan Lo
- Lucile Gleason as Big Tess (as Lucille Webster Gleason)
- Conway Tearle as Vance Palmer
- Esther Howard as Fanny Radler
- Soo Yong as Fah Wong, Rose's Maid
- John Rogers as Buddie
- Ted Oliver as Grigsby
- Lawrence Grant as Sir Gilbert
- Gene Austin as Organist
- Vladimar Bykoff as Marinoff

== Production ==
Production began on September 16, 1935, and concluded in December of that year. Klondike Annie was released February 21, 1936 at a production cost of $1,000,000.

=== Censorship ===
As usual with West's films, scenes were deleted to make this film presentable in most markets. Eight minutes of the film were deleted. The footage is presumably lost. In this lost footage is the scene in which The Frisco Doll stabs Chan Lo when he was going to stab her instead. The other lost scene is when The Frisco Doll switched identities with Sister Annie and dressed Sister Annie up as a prostitute. The veiled connection of Sister Annie and The Salvation Army made this scene inappropriate to the censors but its deletion made the final print of the film appear choppy.

The film was banned from the Chinese market, with the censor saying it violated Chinese national honor.

The State of Georgia went so far as to ban this film outright.

The film caused a rift between West and William Randolph Hearst, who decided never to print West's name in any of his newspapers. The reason given was the racy material of the film and West's sexual persona in a religious setting. West was quoted as saying "I may have invited censorship into Hollywood, but I also saved the industry and Paramount."

== Soundtrack ==
The songs were composed by Gene Austin, who also appeared in the film.

== Reception ==
Writing for The Spectator in 1936, Graham Greene gave the film a good review, declaring that "I thought the whole film fun, more fun than any other of Miss West's since the superb period piece, She Done Him Wrong". Acknowledging his view as a minority opinion, Greene noted that his interpretation of West's characterization of Salvationism to have been harmless fun and not as a satire on religion. Greene also praised McLaglen for his performance.
