= Get Your Man (1927 film) =

1927 film

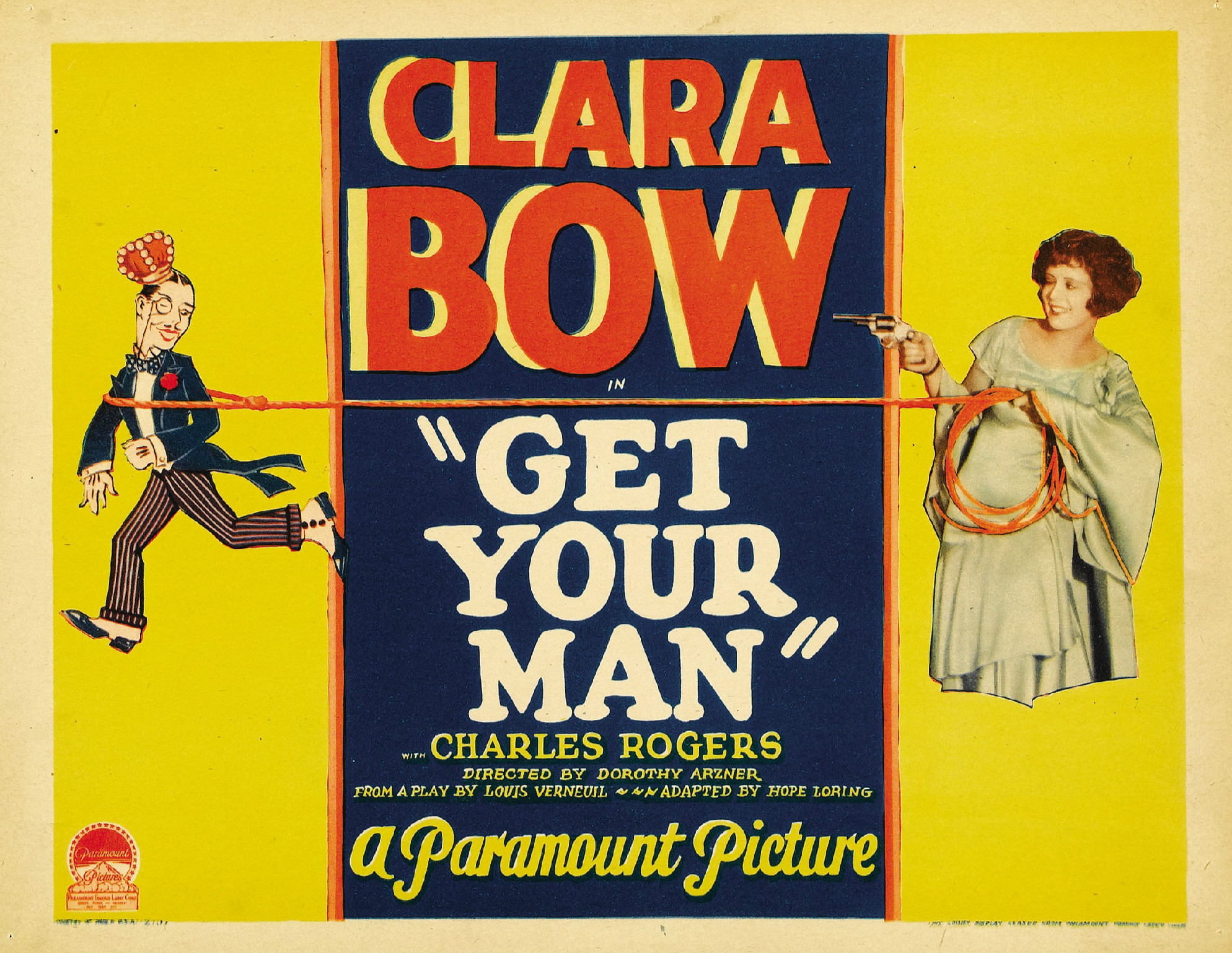
- Lobby card
- Directed by: Dorothy Arzner
- Written by: Hope Loring (scenario); Agnes Brand Leahy (continuity)
- Based on: Tu m'épouseras! (play) by Louis Verneuil
- Produced by: Adolph Zukor; Jesse Lasky; B. P. Schulberg (associate producer)
- Starring: Clara Bow
- Cinematography: Alfred Gilks
- Edited by: Louis D. Lighton
- Distributed by: Paramount Pictures
- Release date: December 7, 1927
- Running time: 60 minutes
- Country: United States
- Language: Silent (English intertitles)

Get Your Man (1927)

Get Your Man is a 1927 American silent romantic comedy film produced by Paramount Famous Lasky Corporation and directed by Dorothy Arzner. The film stars Clara Bow, Charles "Buddy" Rogers, and Josef Swickard. The Library of Congress holds an incomplete print of this film, missing two out of six reels. Paramount did not renew this film's copyright in 1955, so the film is now in the public domain.

== Plot ==
A young girl named Nancy falls in love with handsome Robert. He is to marry soon, yet Nancy develops a plan to finally get him.

Nancy, an American on an unchaperoned trip to Paris, encounters Robert several times in her first day - vying for a taxi in front of her hotel, at a jewelry store, and later in a wax museum. Their mutual attraction is evident. Robert and Simone are engaged to be married, the result of an agreement between their two noble families when Robert was very young and his fiancee an infant. He leaves to spend the weekend at his father's estate with Simone and her father to plan the wedding. He had no regular contact with Simone and this is the first time he will have seen her in years.

Nancy borrows a car and has it "break down" near the gates to Robert's father's estate. Robert's father invites her to stay while she recovers and the car is repaired. She learns that Robert and Simone are engaged, and fabricates her own engagement to inspire Robert's jealousy. Simone reveals that she loves another man and does not want to marry Robert but is bound by duty to her family. Simone's father takes an interest in Nancy and she encourages him. She teases Robert: "If I marry the Marquis, won't that make me your mother-in-law?"

Robert has enough of Nancy's behavior and writes her a letter saying he is going to Africa on safari, leaving both her and Simone. That night, Nancy has trouble latching her bedroom window and develops a plan. Asking Robert to come in and close the window for her, she proceeds to make a lot of noise and bang the furniture around. Robert's father and Simone and her father rush into the room to find Nancy and Robert in an embrace. Simone's father is willing to forgive any indiscretions and still wishes to marry her, while Robert's father insists that Robert has damaged Nancy's reputation and must marry her himself. Everyone goes back to their bedrooms. Robert and Nancy slip into the hallway and kiss.

== Cast ==
- Clara Bow as Nancy Worthington
- Charles "Buddy" Rogers as Robert de Bellecontre
- Josef Swickard as Duc de Bellecontre
- Josephine Hull as Simone de Villeneuve
- Harvey Clark as Marquis de Villeneuve
- Frances Raymond as Mrs. Worthington

unbilled

- David Durand as Robert as a boy
- Tom Ricketts as Old Man in Wax Museum

== Reception ==
Photoplay gave Get Your Man a positive review in its February 1928 issue, saying "Josef Swickard and Harry Clarke [sic] are splendid actors, well cast. Charles Rogers has a boyish appeal that is winning him many friends. This story may be fragile but the photography is beautiful and Clara continues to charm and fascinate." It was rated as one of the best pictures of the month.
