= Manhattan Cocktail (film) =

1928 film

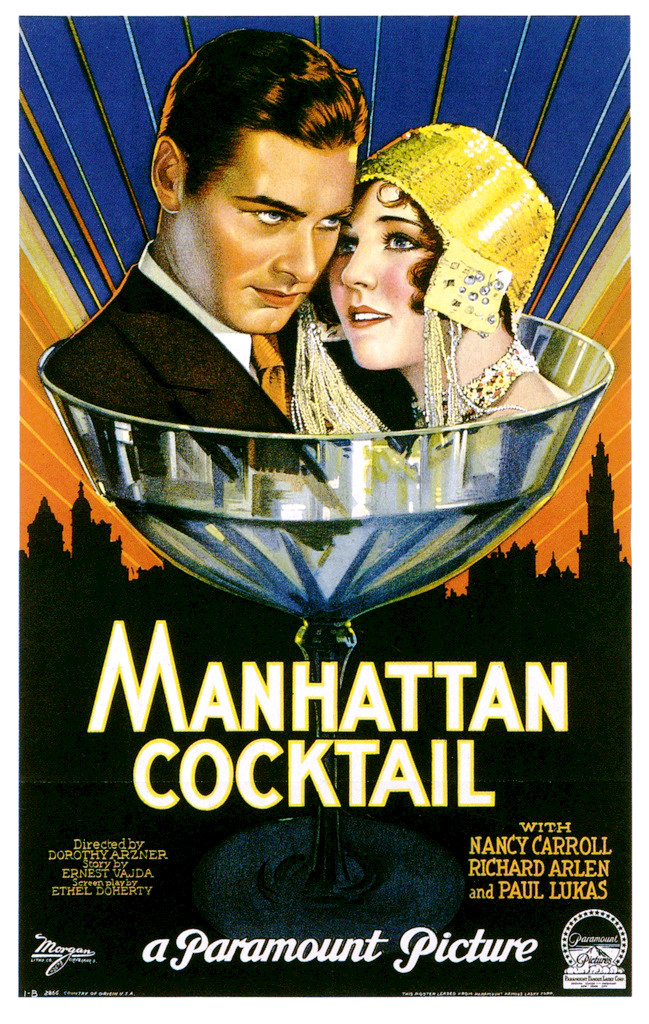
- Theatrical poster
- Directed by: Dorothy Arzner
- Written by: Ethel Doherty (script); George Marion Jr. (titles); Ernest Vajda (story)
- Produced by: Jesse L. Lasky; Adolph Zukor
- Starring: Nancy Carroll; Richard Arlen; Lilyan Tashman; Paul Lukas
- Music by: Victor Schertzinger (songs "Gotta Be Good" and "Another Kiss")
- Production company: Paramount Pictures
- Distributed by: Paramount Pictures
- Release date: November 24, 1928
- Running time: 72 minutes
- Country: United States
- Languages: Sound (Part-Talkie); English

Manhattan Cocktail is a 1928 American part-talkie drama film, directed by Dorothy Arzner, and starring Nancy Carroll, Richard Arlen, and Lilyan Tashman. At the time this movie was made, Hollywood was already making the transition of silent to sound, either making all talking movies, part talking movies, or silent movies with their own soundtrack and sound effects.

== Plot ==
Upon graduating from college, Fred is offered a faculty position and proposes to his sweetheart and classmate Babs. However, Babs, yearning for stardom on Broadway, turns him down and travels to New York with their classmate Bob, who is also stage-struck.

In New York, Bob lands a role in the show of theatrical producer Renov, thanks to the interest shown in him by Mrs. Renov, the producer's wife. Soon after, Bob abandons Babs. Realizing her struggle to find work, he wires Fred under false pretenses, claiming Babs is in need. Fred sets off for New York.

Before Fred arrives, Babs meets Renov and secures a place in his chorus line. Meanwhile, Renov learns of his wife's involvement with Bob and angrily fires the young man. At the theater, Fred meets Mrs. Renov, who turns her affections to him under the guise of supporting a play he has written. Her flirtation ignites further jealousy in Renov.

Plotting revenge, Renov hires Fred as his assistant and then accuses him of forgery. Babs pleads with Renov to drop the charge, and though he agrees, he tries to assault her. She manages to fight him off and escape.

After being released from jail, Fred learns of Renov's attack on Babs and goes to the theater intending to kill him. He arrives just in time to witness Bob, desperate and jobless since his dismissal, strike Renov down with an iron bar. In the chaos, Bob flees and leaps to his death from the theater's fly loft.

Shaken by the harrowing events, Babs finds herself unable to perform. As the curtain rises on the show, she chooses to leave the stage behind and departs with Fred for the quiet and security of their college town.

== Cast ==
- Nancy Carroll as Babs
- Richard Arlen as Fred
- Danny O’Shea as Bob
- Paul Lukas as Renov
- Lilyan Tashman as Mrs. Renov

== Music ==
The film featured a theme song entitled "Another Kiss" that was composed by Victor L. Schertzinger. Victor Schertzinger also composed a song called "Gotta Be Good" that was also featured in the film. Both songs are sung by Nancy Carroll in the film.

== Preservation status ==
Manhattan Cocktail is a lost film except for a one-minute montage sequence, "Skyline Dance" by Slavko Vorkapich, which was released in October 2005 on the DVD Unseen Cinema: Early American Avant Garde Film 1894–1941.

== See also ==
- List of early sound feature films (1926–1929)
