= Fashions for Women =

1927 film

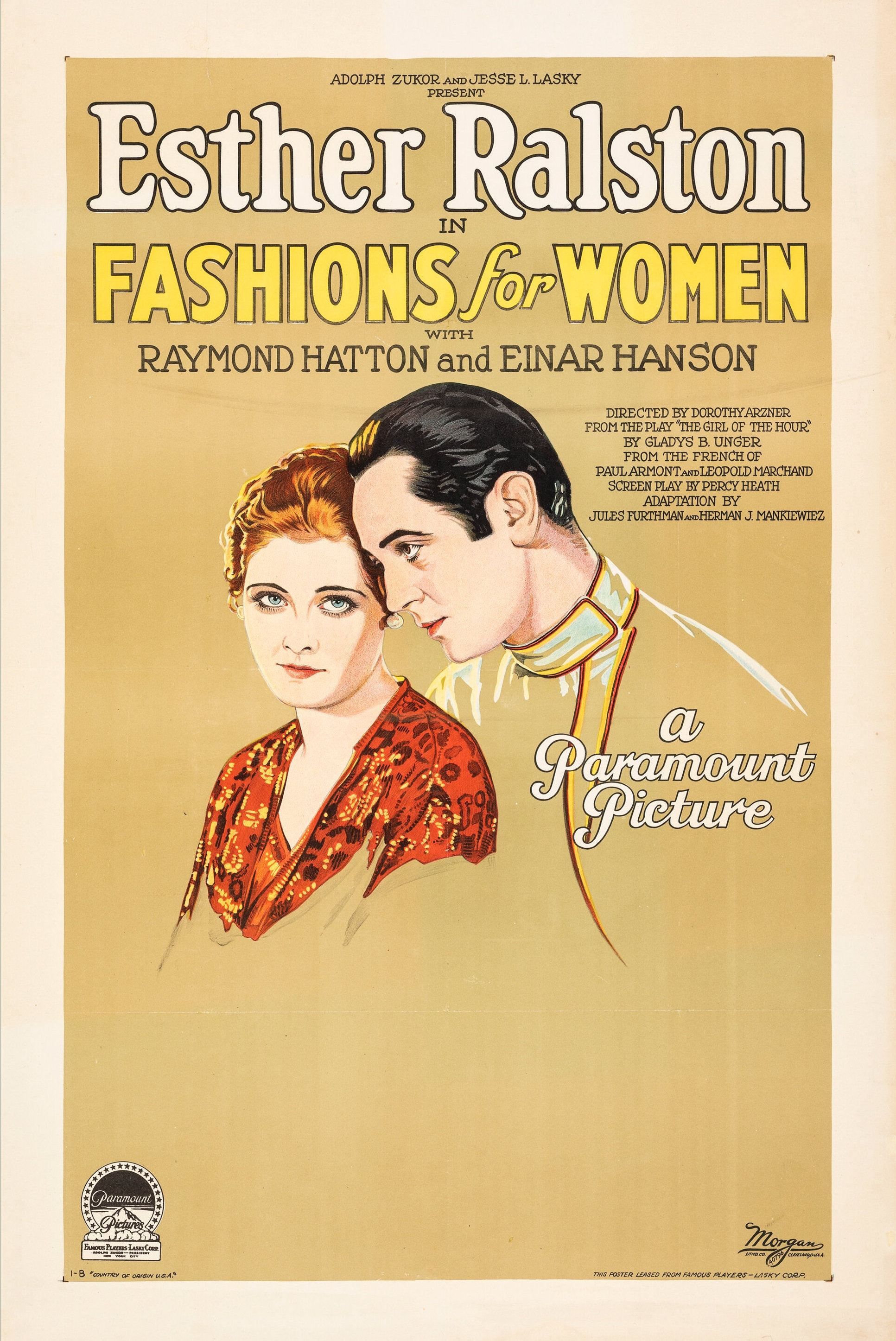
- Style B poster
- Directed by: Dorothy Arzner
- Screenplay by: Jules Furthman; Percy Heath; Herman J. Mankiewicz; George Marion Jr.
- Based on: The Girl of the Hour; 1923 play by Paul Armont and Léopold Marchand
- Produced by: B. P. Schulberg; Jesse L. Lasky; Adolph Zukor
- Starring: Esther Ralston; Raymond Hatton; Einar Hanson; Edward Martindel; William Orlamond; Agostino Borgato
- Cinematography: H. Kinley Martin
- Edited by: Marion Morgan
- Production company: Famous Players–Lasky Corporation
- Distributed by: Paramount Pictures
- Release date: March 26, 1927
- Running time: 70 minutes
- Country: United States
- Language: Silent (English intertitles)

Fashions for Women is a 1927 American silent comedy-drama film directed by Dorothy Arzner and written by Jules Furthman, Percy Heath, Herman J. Mankiewicz, and George Marion Jr. based upon a play by Paul Armont and Léopold Marchand. The film stars Esther Ralston, Raymond Hatton, Einar Hanson, Edward Martindel, William Orlamond, and Agostino Borgato. The film was released on March 26, 1927, by Paramount Pictures.

== Plot ==
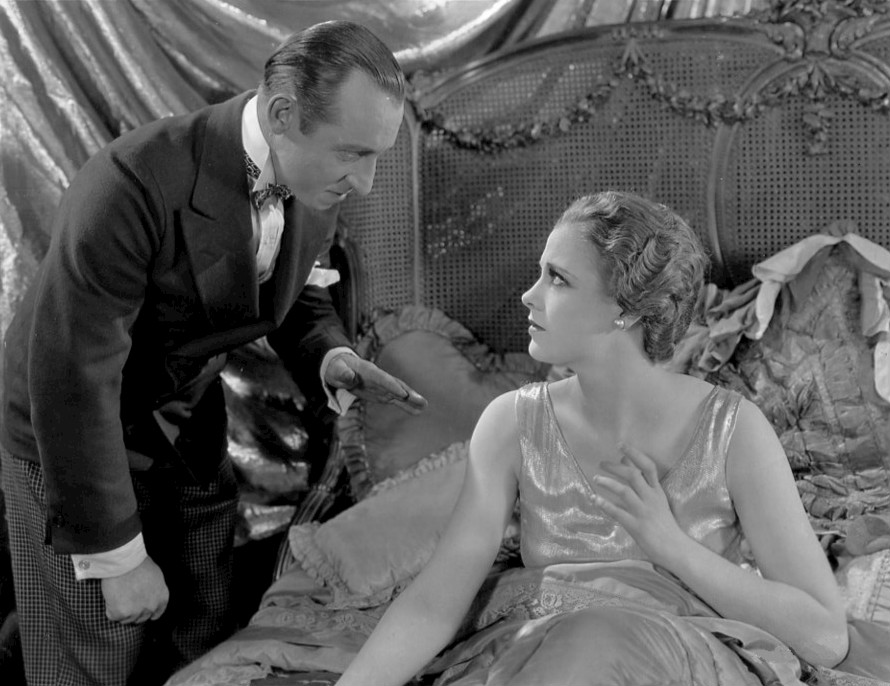
Still with Raymond Hatton and Esther Ralston

A social comedy about a cigarette girl, Lulu, who falls in love with a count while finding success as a fashion model.

== Cast ==
- Esther Ralston as Céleste de Givray and Lola Dauvry
- Raymond Hatton as Sam Dupont
- Einar Hanson as Raoul de Bercy
- Edward Martindel as Duke of Arles
- William Orlamond as Roue
- Agostino Borgato as Monsieur Alard
- Edward Faust as Monsieur Pettibon
- Yvonne Howell as Mimi
- Maude Wayne as The Girl
- Charles Darvas as Restaurant Manager

== Preservation ==
The film is now considered to be a lost film.
