= The Lucky Devil =

1925 film by Frank Tuttle

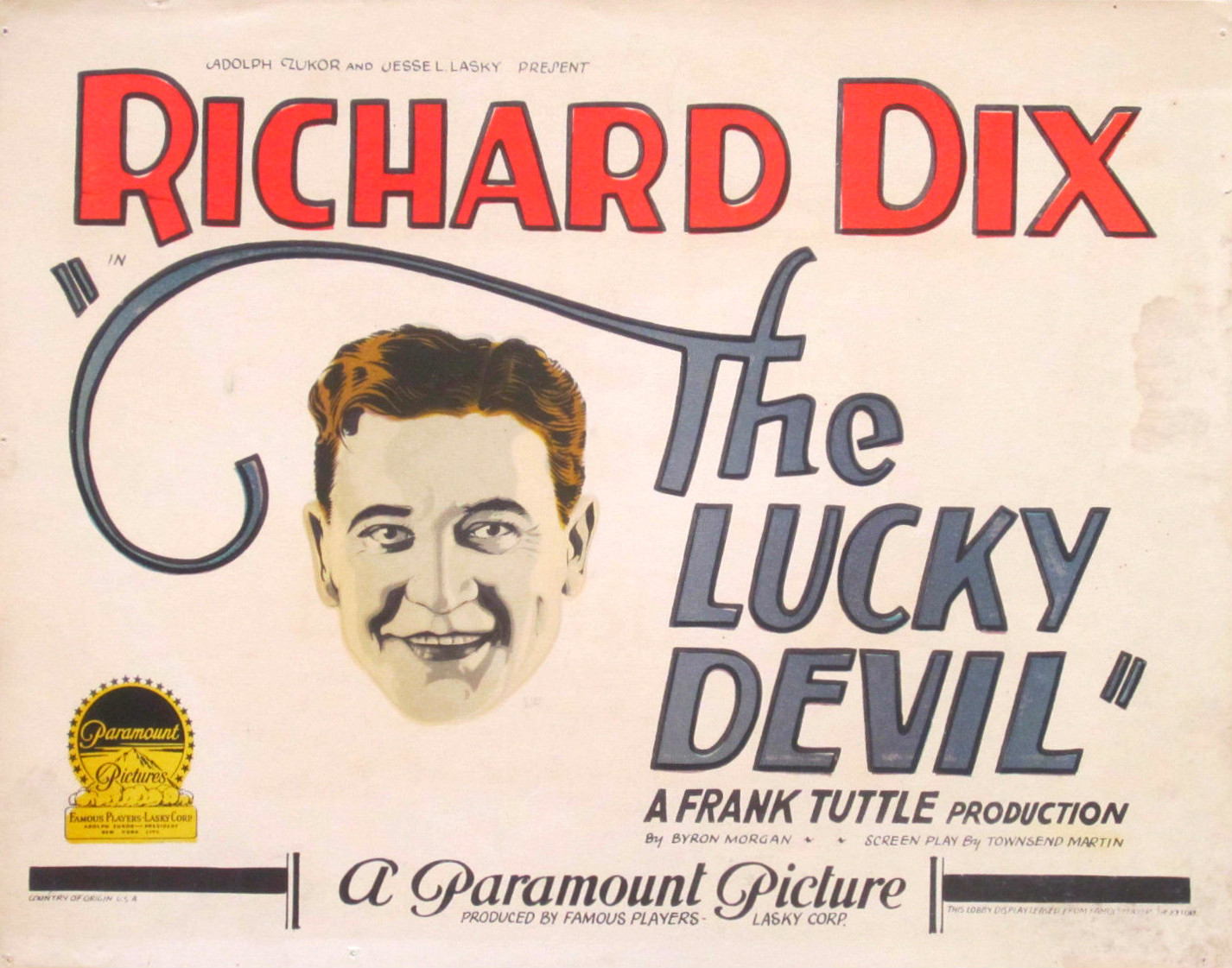
- Lobby card
- Directed by: Frank Tuttle
- Written by: Townsend Martin (scenario)
- Story by: Byron Morgan
- Produced by: Adolph Zukor; Jesse L. Lasky
- Starring: Richard Dix; Esther Ralston
- Cinematography: Alvin Wyckoff
- Production company: Famous Players–Lasky
- Distributed by: Paramount Pictures
- Release date: July 13, 1925
- Running time: 63 minutes (6 reels; 5,935 feet)
- Country: United States
- Language: Silent (English intertitles)

The Lucky Devil is a 1925 American silent comedy-drama film, also known as Lucky Devil, directed by Frank Tuttle, and released by Paramount Pictures.

== Plot ==
Randy Farman, who demonstrates camping outfits in a department store, wins a racing car in a raffle and sets out for the West. He runs out of gas, loses all his money, and falls in love with a girl called Doris, who, accompanied by her aunt, is on her way to Nampa City to claim an inheritance.

Arriving at their destination, Doris and her aunt discover that the uncle, who sent for them, is locked up in an asylum, having invented the entire story of the bequest. Randy enters an exhibition fight with the champion boxer and stays long enough to win the entrance fee for an automobile race at the county fair. The sheriff has attached Randy's car for nonpayment of a hotel bill, and Randy must drive the entire race with the sheriff in the seat beside him. Randy wins the race, a substantial prize, and Doris' love.

== Cast ==
- Richard Dix as Bill Phelps
- Esther Ralston as Doris Kent
- Edna May Oliver as Aunt Abbie Kent
- Tom Findley as Franklyne Sr.
- Anthony Jowitt as Rudolph Franklyne
- Joseph Burke as the Bicycle Man
- Mary Foy as Mrs. Hunt
- Edward "Gunboat" Smith as Sailor Sheldon
- Charles Sellon as the Constable
- Charles Hammond as Tobias Sedgmore
- Charles McDonald as Tom Barrity
- George Webb as "Frenchy" Roget
- Jack La Rue as a Prizefight Attendant (uncredited)

== Preservation status ==
This film is preserved at the Library of Congress, George Eastman Museum, the UCLA Film & Television Archive, and the Pacific Film Archive at the University of California, Berkeley.
