= Esther Ralston =

American actress (1902–1994)

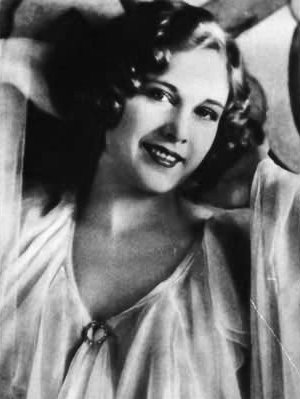
- Ralston in Photoplay, 1930
- Born: Esther Louise Worth; September 17, 1902; Bar Harbor, Maine, U.S.
- Died: January 14, 1994 (aged 91); Ventura, California, U.S.
- Occupation: Actress
- Years active: 1915–1962
- Spouses: George Webb (m. 1926; div. 1934) Will Morgan (m. 1935; div. 1938) Ted Lloyd (m. 1939; div. 1954)
- Children: 3
- Relatives: Bob Ralston (nephew)

Esther Ralston (born Esther Louise Worth, September 17, 1902 – January 14, 1994) was an American silent film star. Her most prominent sound picture was To the Last Man in 1933.

== Early life and career ==
Ralston was born Esther Louise Worth in Bar Harbor, Maine, in 1902, (Note: The birth certificate of Esther Louise Worth indicates that she was born in Eden, Maine, which – until March 3, 1918 – had been the name of Bar Harbor) one of five siblings. She was the older sister of actor Howard Ralston (July 25, 1904 – June 1, 1992), who appeared in nine films between 1920 and 1924.

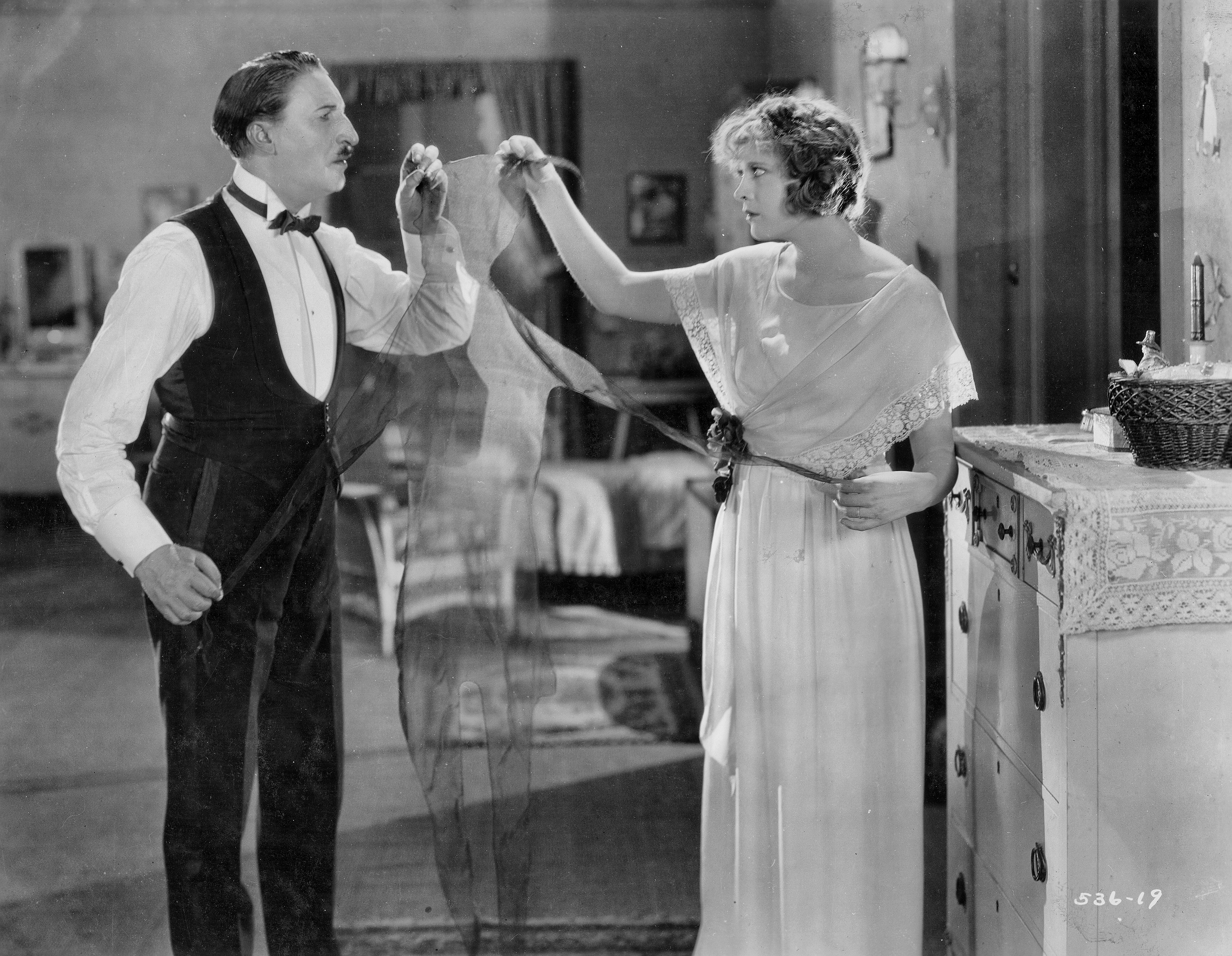
With Cyril Chadwick in Peter Pan (1924)

She began her career as a child actress in a family vaudeville act, which was billed as "The Ralston Family with Baby Esther, America's Youngest Juliet". From this, she appeared in a few small, silent-film roles, including alongside her brother in the 1920 film adaptation of Huckleberry Finn. Ralston later gained attention as Mrs. Darling in the 1924 film version of Peter Pan.

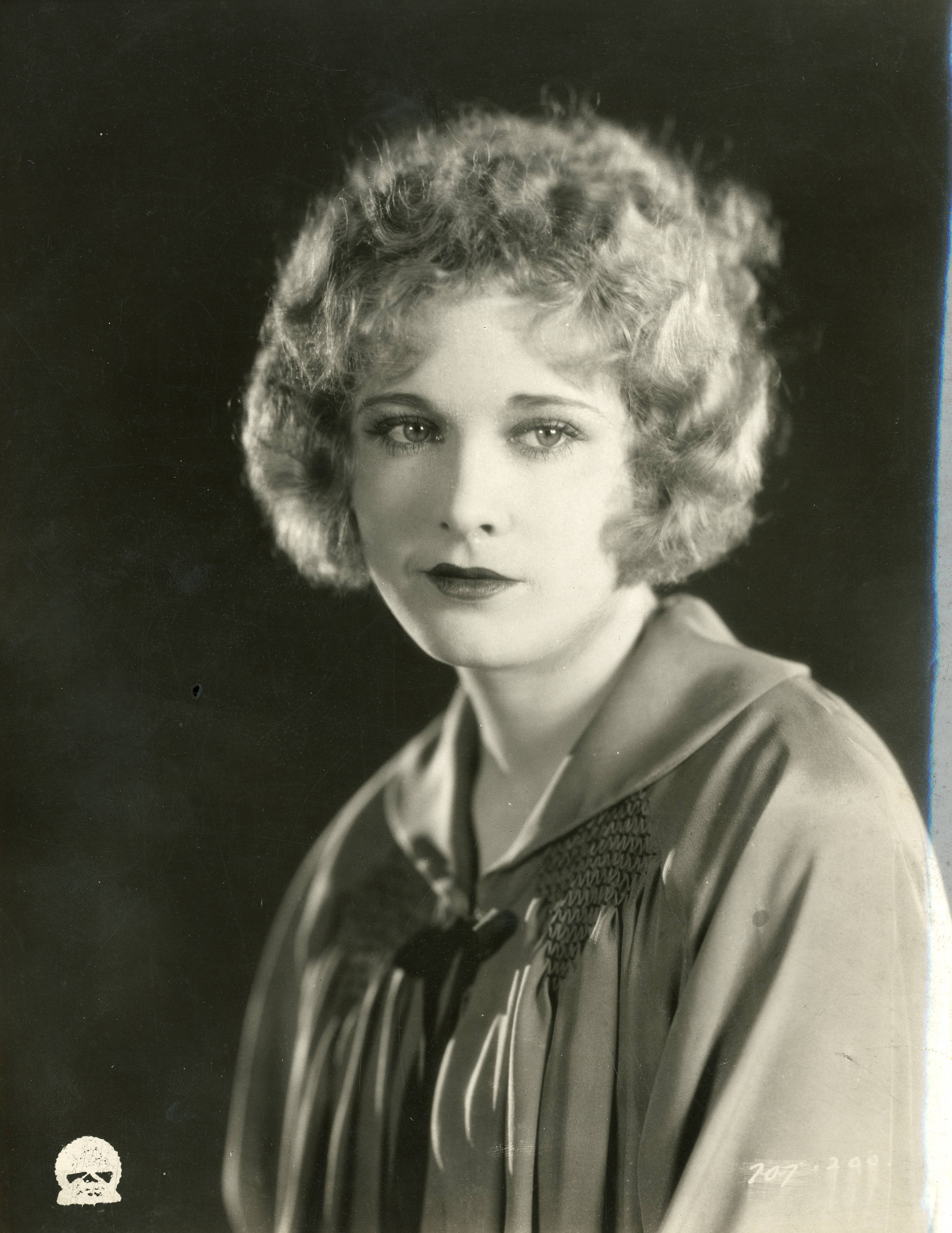
Ralston in 1925

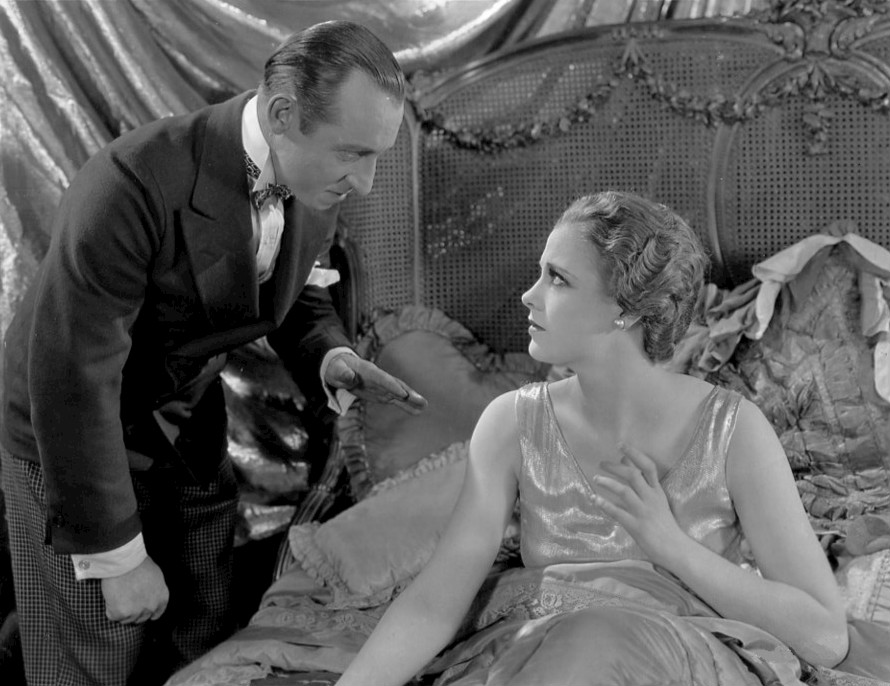
With Raymond Hatton in Fashions for Women (1927)

In the late 1920s, she appeared in many films for Paramount, at one point earning as much as $8,000 per week, and garnering much popularity, especially in United Kingdom. She appeared mainly in comedies, usually with her name billed above the title, often portraying spirited society girls, and also received good reviews for her forays into dramatic roles.

On radio, Ralston portrayed Kathy Marsh in Portia Faces Life and Marcella Hudnall in Our Gal Sunday.

== Retirement and later years ==
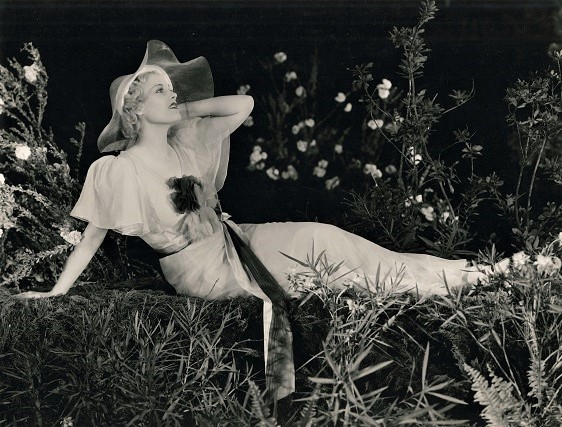
Ralston in 1934

Despite making a successful transition to sound films, she mainly was relegated to supporting roles by the mid-1930s. Her last leading role was in To the Last Man in 1933, directed by Henry Hathaway and starring Randolph Scott, with a supporting cast featuring Noah Beery Sr., Buster Crabbe, Shirley Temple, and John Carradine. In his book, The Hollywood Western: Ninety Years of Cowboys and Indians, Train Robbers, Sheriffs and Gunslingers, film historian William K. Everson discusses the film, writing:

To the Last Man was almost a model of its kind, an exceptionally strong story of feuding families in the post-Civil War era, with a cast worthy of an "A" feature, excellent direction by Henry Hathaway, and an unusual climactic fight between the villain (Jack LaRue) and the heroine (Esther Ralston, in an exceptionally appealing performance).

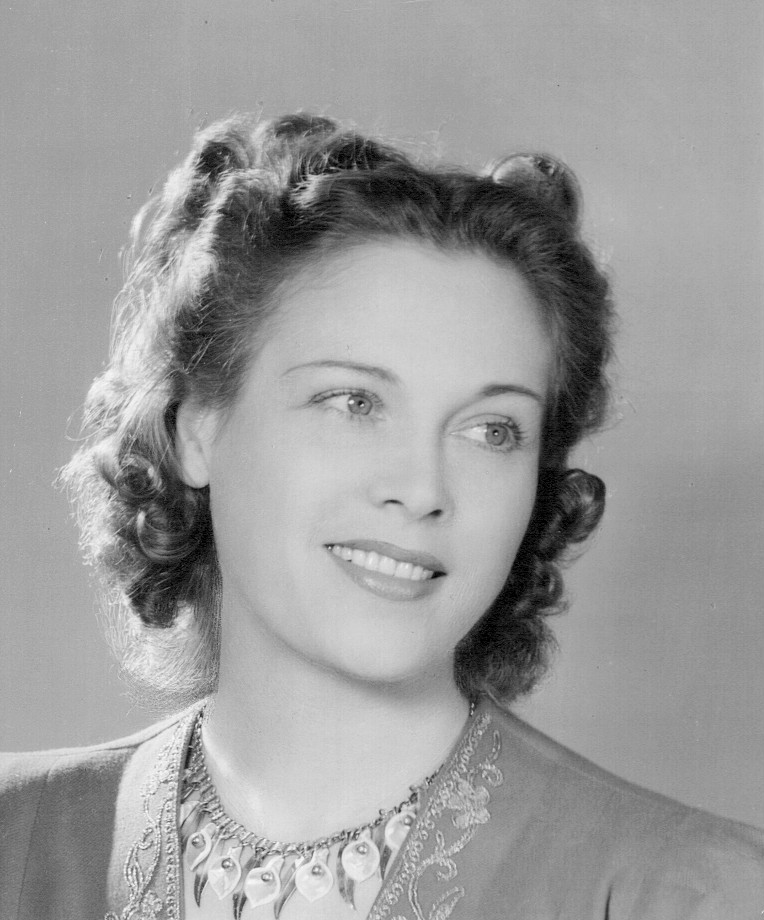
Ralston in 1941

Ralston made her final film Tin Pan Alley in 1940 and chose to retire from films. She continued working on the stage and in radio throughout the 1940s, including being the leading lady for part of the run of Woman of Courage.

Ralston, 1930s

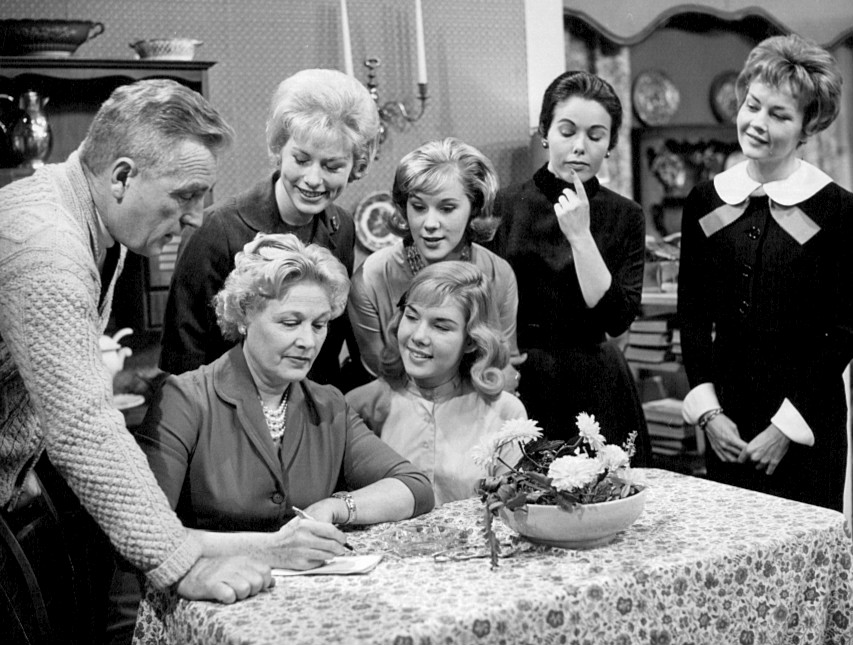
Ralston (seated, left) in Our Five Daughters (1961); all five of the actresses playing her daughters resembled Ralston in her heyday,

She returned to the screen in the early 1950s with guest roles on television series, including a Kraft Television Theatre version of Daphne Du Maurier's "September Tide" and an episode of Tales of Tomorrow titled "All the Time in the World". In 1962, she had a leading role in the short-lived daytime drama Our Five Daughters, her final onscreen role (all five of the actresses playing her daughters resembled Ralston in her heyday).

In 1985, Ralston released her autobiography Some Day We'll Laugh. In the book, she mentions that her career was sabotaged by Louis B. Mayer when she refused to sleep with him at the beginning of a swiftly abortive contract at his studio. She was graylisted and soon found herself toppled from the height of the industry to being predominantly relegated to supporting roles, mainly at minor studios, solving the mystery of why her career faltered at the dawn of sound despite her having had a lifetime of theatrical stage experience and a superb speaking voice.

== Marriages ==
- On December 25, 1925, Ralston married her manager, actor George Webb Frey, in Manhattan, New York. He was credited in films as George Webb. They had a daughter, Mary Esther (born 1931), who at birth was known as the "$100,000 Baby" because her mother turned down a substantial film contract while pregnant. George and Esther divorced in 1934. George filed for bankruptcy in Los Angeles in March 1934.
- On June 16, 1935, Ralston married actor Will Morgan (Wilburt Whitfield Morgan), then a former New York stage actor and singer. They divorced in 1938. Morgan led the saxophone section for eight years for Fred Waring.
- On August 6, 1939, Ralston married radio announcer and columnist Ted Lloyd (Theodore Allen Lloyd) in Greenwich, Connecticut. Music publisher Jack Robbins (John Jacob Robbins) was Lloyd's best man. The couple had two children, Judy and Ted, Jr. Ted and Esther divorced in 1954. Before marrying Ralston, Lloyd had worked for newspapers and Radio News. In 1942, Lloyd became director of radio for 20th Century Fox. In 1946, with Hal Horne and Armand Deutsch, Lloyd formed Ted Lloyd, Inc. to manage personalities and to produce radio (later TV) programs. He produced several radio dramas, including My True Story for the NBC Red Network, Adventures of the Abbotts on NBC Red Network (18 episodes in 1955), Whispering Streets for CBS Radio, and Escape for CBS-TV.

== Death ==
On January 14, 1994, Ralston died of a heart attack at age 91 in her home in Ventura, California. The family held services on January 17, 1994, in Ventura, California, the day of the Northridge earthquake.

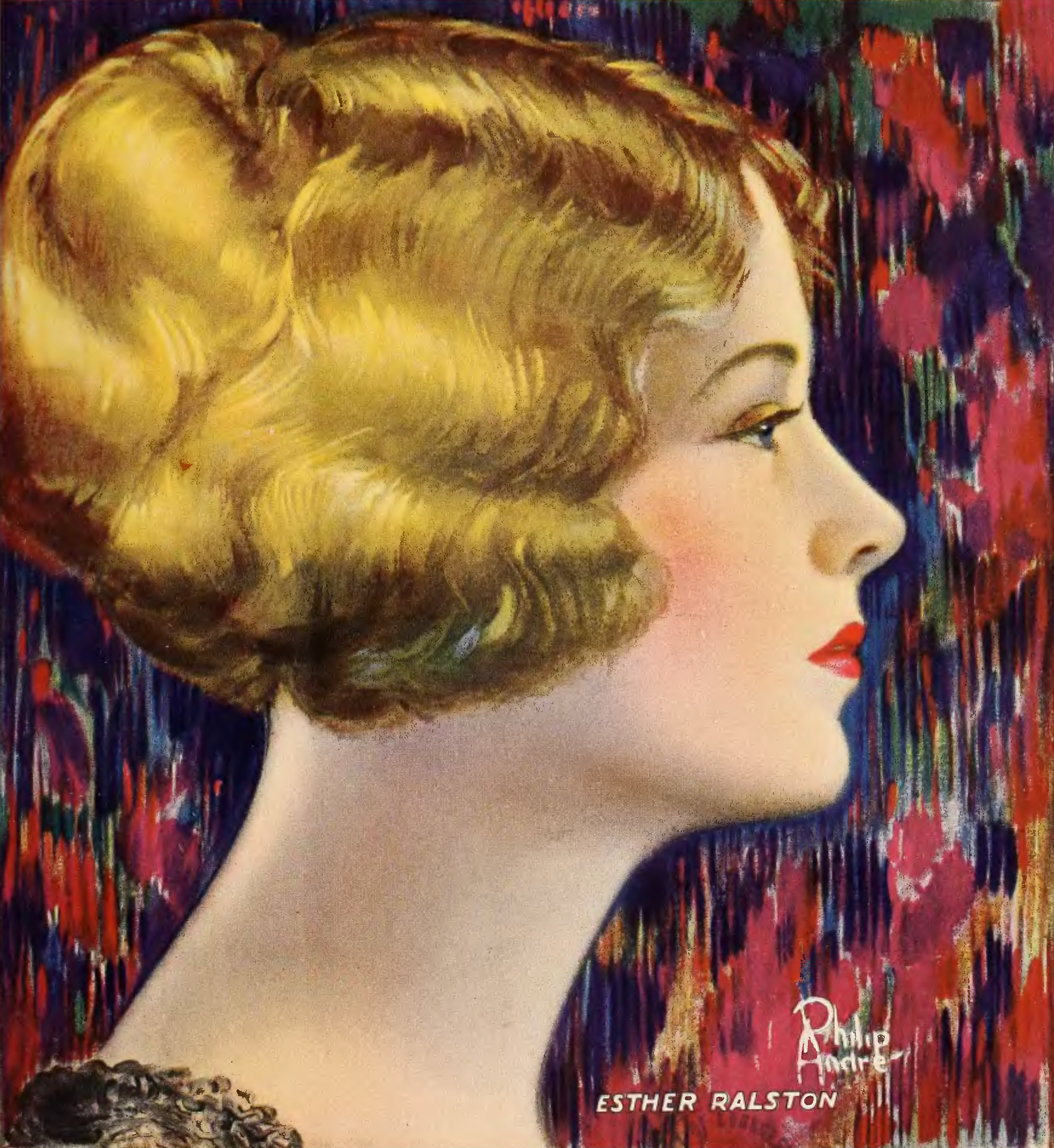
Esther Ralston cover art from Picture-Play Magazine

For her contribution to the motion picture industry, Esther Ralston has a star on the Hollywood Walk of Fame at 6664 Hollywood Boulevard.

== Filmography ==
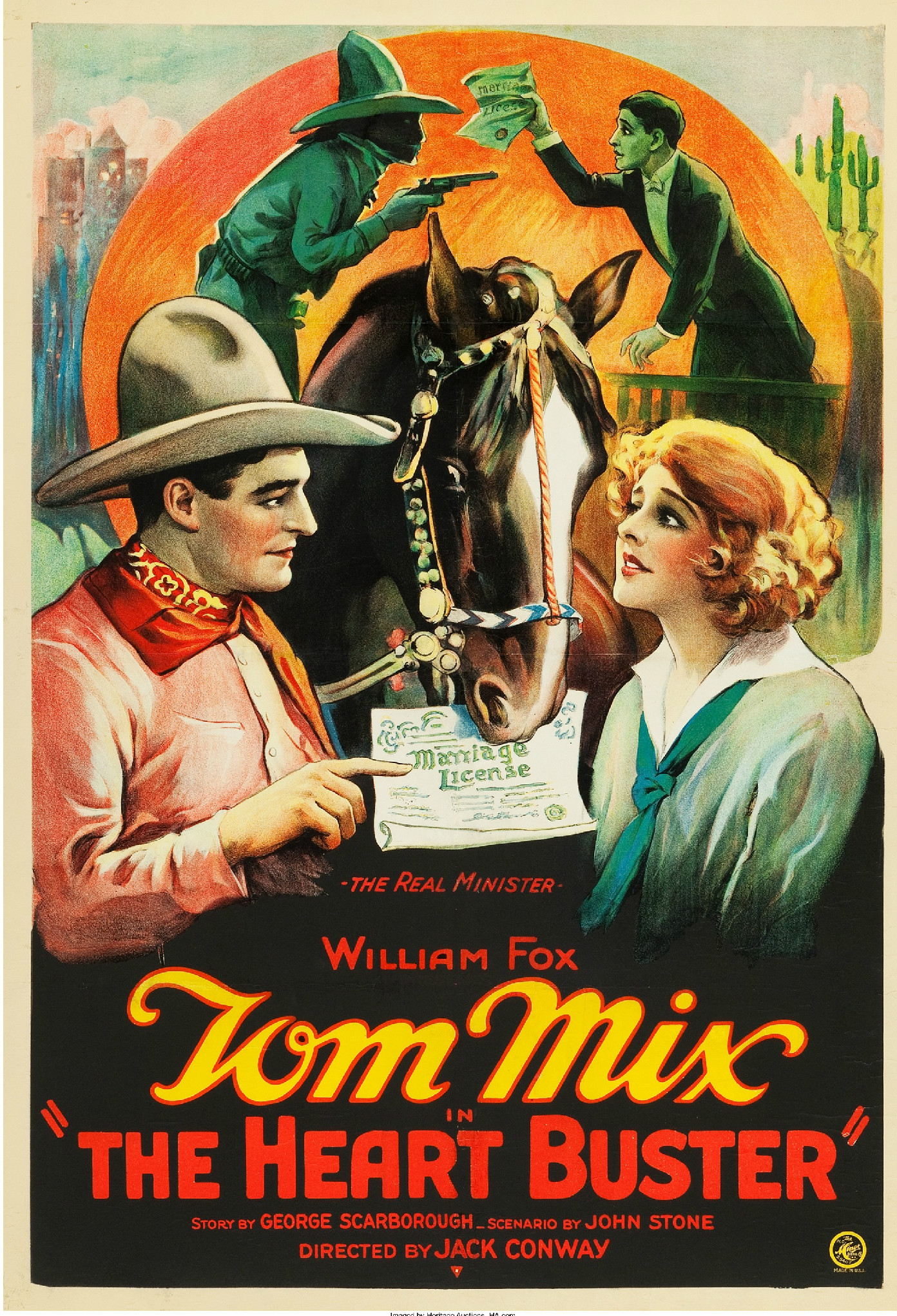
Tom Mix and Ralston in 1924

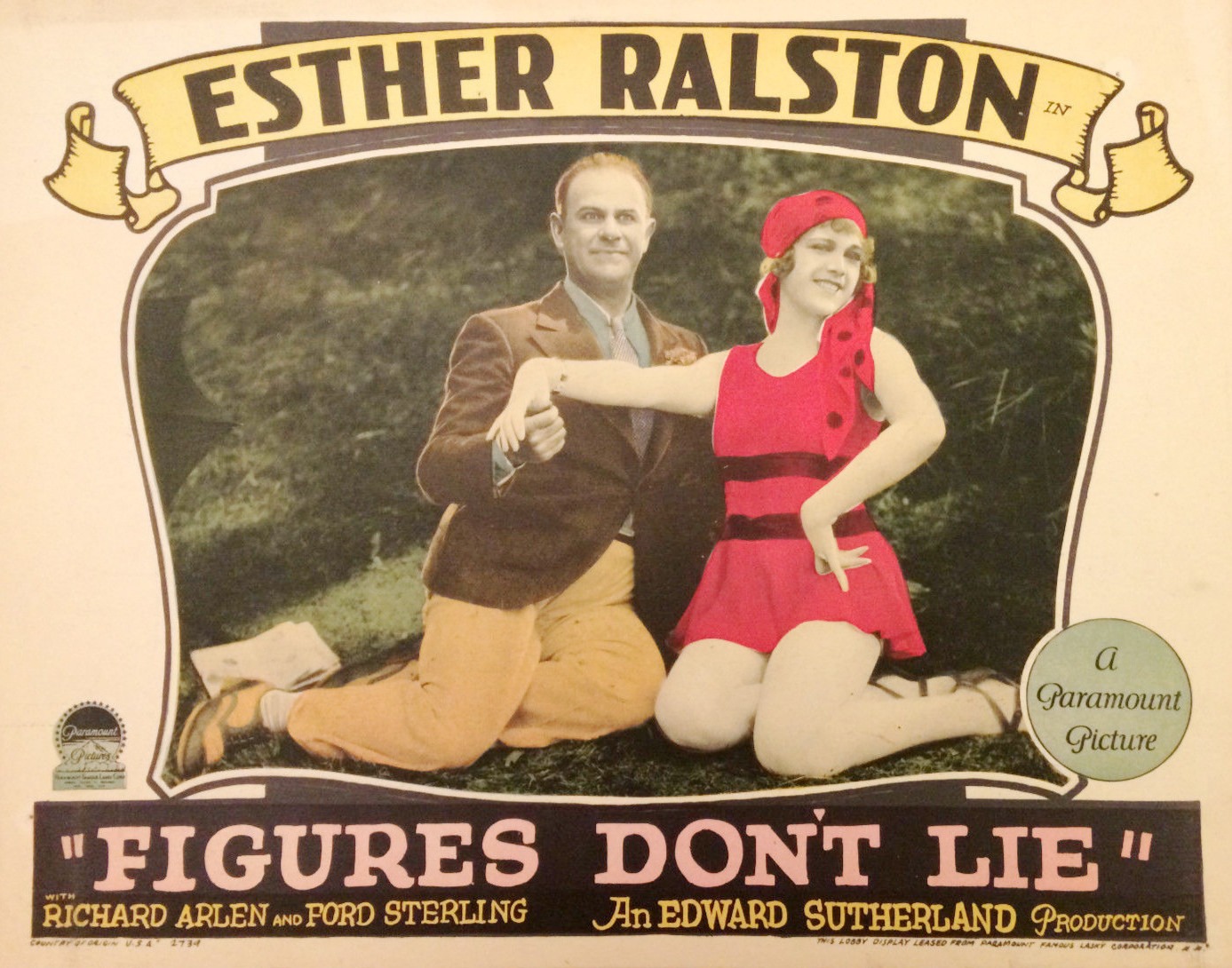
Ford Sterling and Ralston in 1927

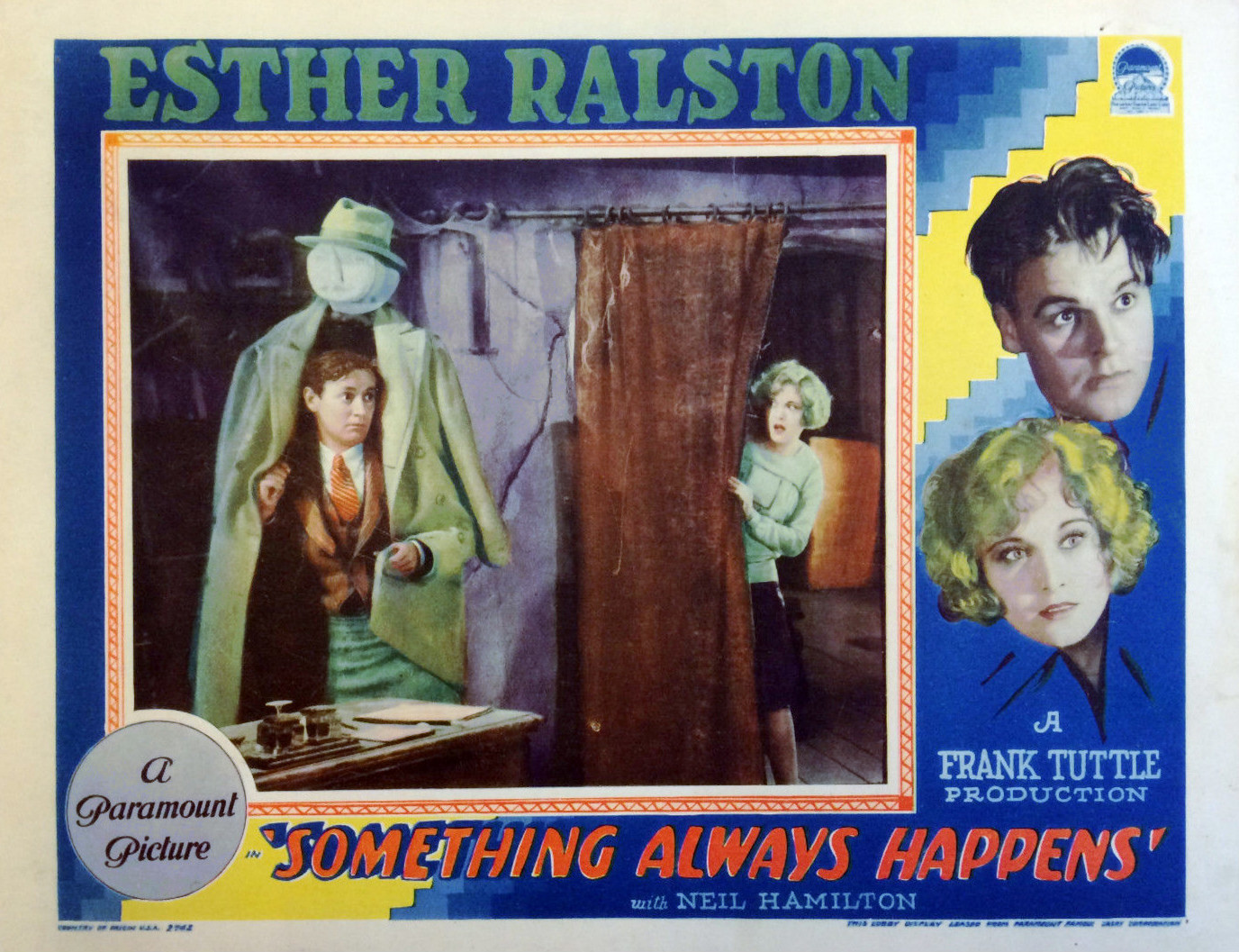
Ralston and Neil Hamilton in 1928

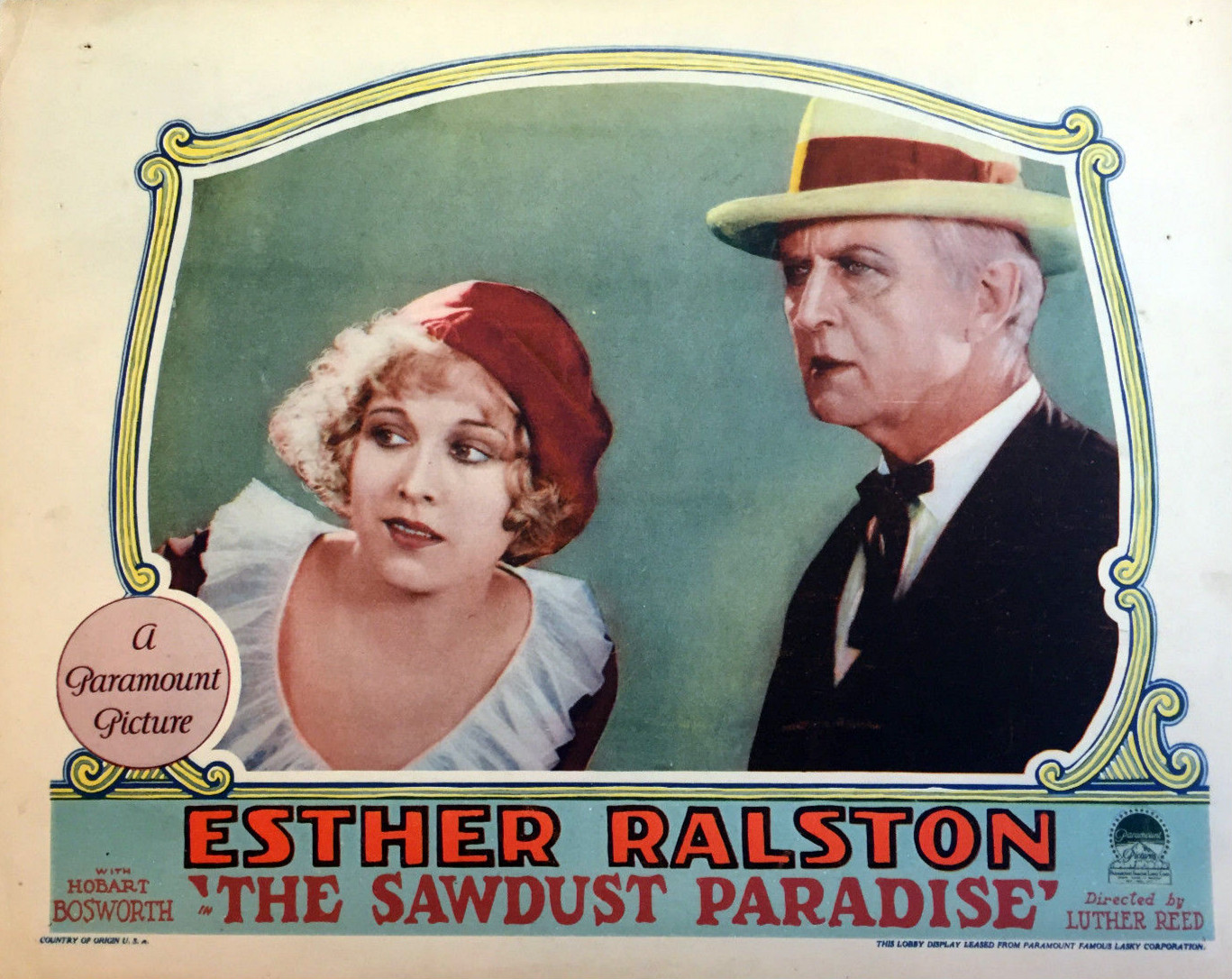
Lobby card, 1928

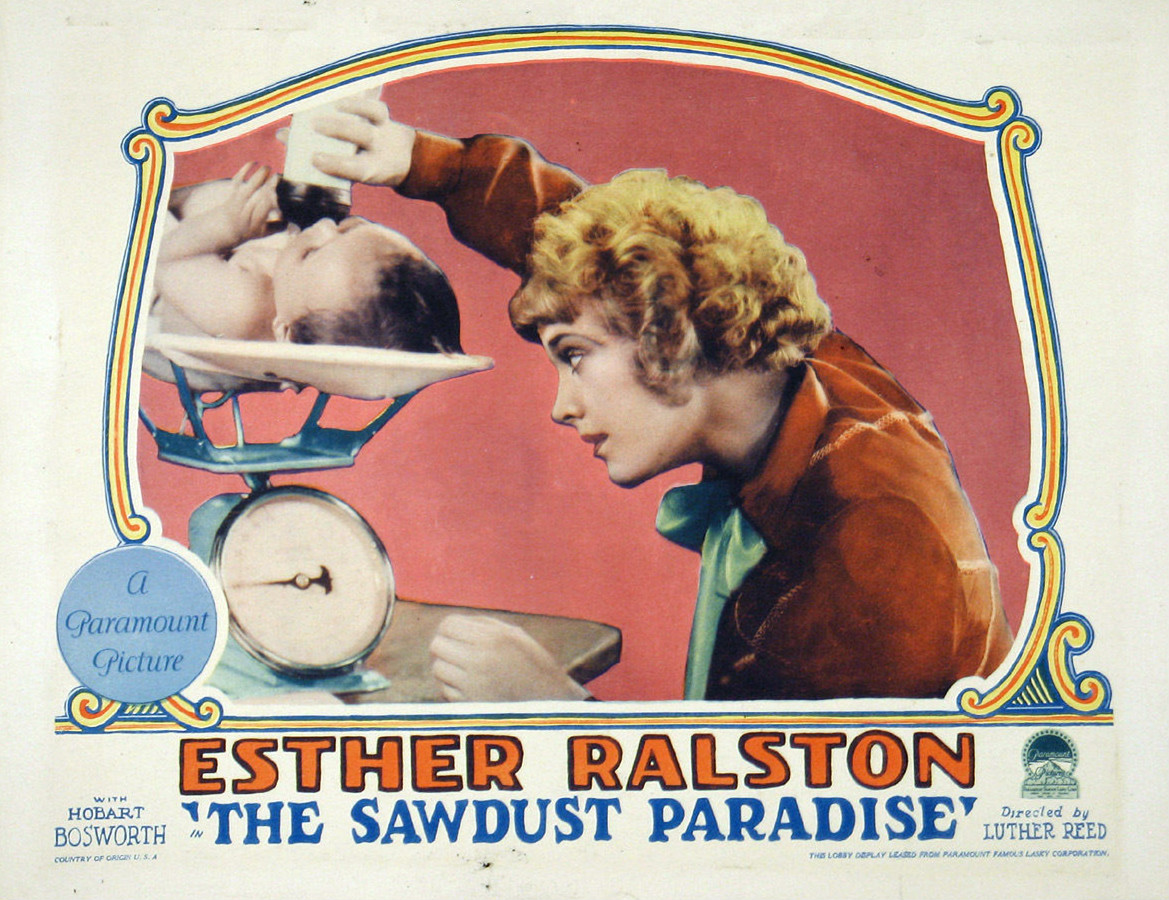
Lobby card, 1928

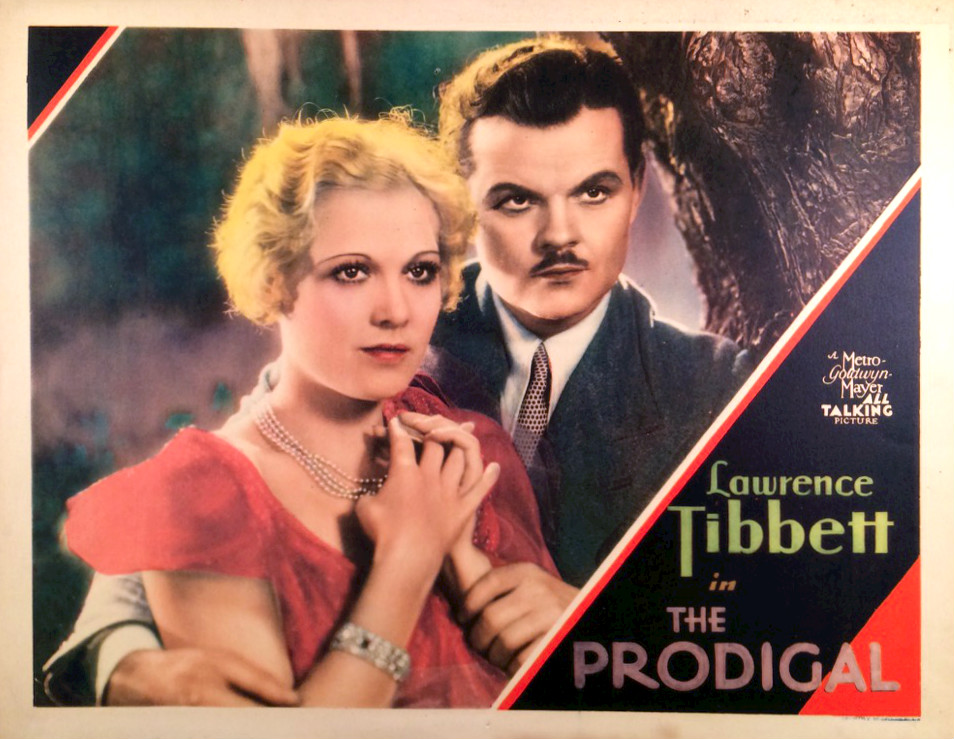
Lobby card, 1931

Film
Year	Title	Role	Notes
1915	The Deep Purple	Bit, extra...as an Angel	Uncredited; Lost film
1918	The Doctor and the Woman	Minor Role	Uncredited; Lost film
1918	For Husbands Only	Bit part	Uncredited; Lost film
1920	Huckleberry Finn	Mary Jane Wilks	
1920	The Peddler of Lies	Minor Role	Lost
1920	The Butterfly Man		Uncredited; Lost film
1920	Dangerous to Men	Minor Role	Lost
1920	Whispering Devils	Rose Gibbard	Lost film
1920	To Please One Woman		Presumed lost
1921	The Kid	Extra in Heaven Scene	Uncredited
1921	What Do Men Want?		Uncredited; Incomplete film
1921	Crossing Trails	Helen Stratton	Lost film
1922	Daring Danger	Ethel Stanton	Lost film
1922	Remembrance	Beatrice	Lost film
1922	Pals of the West	Nina	
1922	Youth to Youth		Lost film
1922	The Lone Hand		Lost film
1922	Oliver Twist	Rose Maylie	
1923	The Prisoner	Marie	Lost film
1923	The Phantom Fortune	Mary Rogers	Lost film
1923	Railroaded	Joan Dunster	Lost film
1923	The Victor	Chewing Gum Baron's Daughter	Lost film
1923	Blinky	Mary Lou Kileen	Lost film
1923	The Wild Party	Bess Furth	Lost film
1923	Pure Grit	Stella Bolling	Lost film
1924	The Marriage Circle	Miss Hofer	
1924	Jack O'Clubs	Queenie Hatch	Lost film
1924	Fight and Win	Holly Malloy	
1924	The Heart Buster	Rose Hillyer	Lost film
1924	Wolves of the North	Madge Chester	Lost film Serial
1924	Peter Pan	Mrs. Darling	
1924	$50,000 Reward	Carolyn Jordan	
1925	The Little French Girl	Toppie Westmacott	Lost film
1925	The Goose Hangs High	Dagmar Carroll	Lost film
1925	Beggar on Horseback	Cynthia Mason	Incomplete film
1925	The Lucky Devil	Doris McDee	
1925	The Trouble with Wives	Dagmar	Lost film
1925	The Best People	Alice O'Neil	Lost film
1925	A Kiss for Cinderella	Fairy Godmother	
1925	Womanhandled	Molly Martin	
1926	The American Venus	Mary Gray	Lost film
1926	The Blind Goddess	Moira Devens	Lost film
1926	The Quarterback	Louise Mason	
1926	Old Ironsides	Esther	
1927	Fashions for Women	Céleste de Givray and Lola Dauvry	Lost film
1927	Children of Divorce	Jean Waddington	
1927	Ten Modern Commandments	Kitty O'Day	Lost film
1927	Figures Don't Lie	Janet Wells	Lost film
1927	The Spotlight	Lizzie Stokes / Olga Rostova	Lost film
1928	Love and Learn	Nancy Blair	Lost film
1928	Something Always Happens	Diana Mallory	Lost film
1928	Half a Bride	Patience Winslow	Lost film
1928	The Sawdust Paradise	Hallie	Lost film
1929	The Case of Lena Smith	Lena Smith	Lost film
1929	Betrayal	Vroni	Lost film
1929	The Wheel of Life	Ruth Dangan	
1929	The Mighty	Louise Patterson	
1931	Lonely Wives	Madeline Smith	
1931	The Prodigal	Antonia Farraday	
1932	Rome Express	Asta Marvelle	
1932	After the Ball	Elissa Strange	
1933	Black Beauty	Leila Lambert	
1933	To the Last Man	Ellen Colby	Alternative title: Law of Vengeance
1933	By Candlelight	Baroness von Ballin	
1934	Sadie McKee	Dolly Merrick	
1934	Romance in the Rain	Gwen de la Rue	
1934	The Marines Are Coming	Dorothy Manning	
1934	Strange Wives	Olga	
1935	Mister Dynamite	Charmian Dvorjak	
1935	Ladies Crave Excitement	Miss Winkler	
1935	Shadows of the Orient	Viola Avery	
1935	Streamline Express	Elaine Vincent	
1935	Together We Live	Jenny	
1935	Streamline Express	Elaine Vincent	
1935	Forced Landing	Ruby Anatole	
1936	The Girl from Mandalay	Mary Trevor	
1936	Hollywood Boulevard	Flora Moore	
1936	Reunion	Janet Fair	
1936	We're in the Legion Now!	Louise Rillette	
1937	As Good as Married	Miss Danforth	
1937	Jungle Menace	Valerie Shield	Serial, [Chs. 1, 3, 6, 7, 15]
1937	The Mysterious Pilot	Vivian McNain	Serial, [Chs.10-11]
1938	The Spy Ring	Jean Bruce	
1938	Letter of Introduction	Mrs. Sinclair	Uncredited
1938	Slander House	Ruth De Milo	
1940	Tin Pan Alley	Nora Bayes	
1940	The San Francisco Docks	Frances March	

Television
Year	Title	Role	Notes
1952	Kraft Television Theatre		Episode: "September Tide"
1952	Tales of Tomorrow	The Collector	Episode: "All the Time in the World"
1953	Broadway Television Theatre	Mrs. Bancroft	Episode: "The Noose"
1962	Our Five Daughters	Helen Lee	
