= Sada Cowan =

American screenwriter (1882–1943)

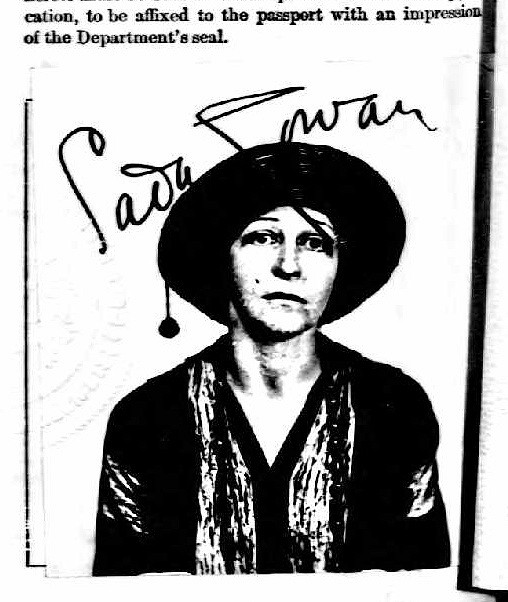
- Cowan in 1921
- Born: Sada Louise Cowan; September 8, 1882; Boston, Massachusetts
- Died: July 31, 1943 (aged 60); Los Angeles, California
- Occupations: Playwright, screenwriter
- Writing career
- Notable works: Don't Change Your Husband; Why Change Your Wife?

Sada Louise Cowan (1882–1943) was an American writer who began her career as a playwright. She soon switched to writing feature films and is best known for her work on the films Don't Change Your Husband and Why Change Your Wife?. Cowan worked closely with director Cecil B. DeMille throughout her career.

== Early life ==
Sada Louise Cowan was born on September 8, 1882, in Boston, Massachusetts. She attended a private boarding school in the Boston area. However, as a teenager Cowan moved to Germany to study music. After finding that writing music was not fulfilling enough for her she switched to writing plays. In Frankfurt, Germany, she wrote her first hit play from start to finish in two hours titled, Sintram of Skagerrak. Cowan's inspiration for writing this play was hearing Frederick Lamond’s piano recital of Chopin. She started to write plays that got her name on the map. These were titled The State Forbids, In the Morgue, Playing the Game, The Moonlit Way, The Wonder of the Age, The Honor of America and Pomp, respectively.

== Silent film ==
After success writing plays, Cowan switched over to writing full length silent films. In 1919, at thirty-six years old, her first film, The Woman Under Cover, starring Fritzi Brunette, was completed. The film was described by the Exhibitors Herald as heavily dramatic but with frequent and smartly placed bits of humor dispersed within it. This successful film led to Cowan’s writing of numerous others, in which she worked with directors such as Harry Garson and Cecil B. DeMille. Some of Cowan’s most popular films include The Reckless Lady and The Charmer.

== Why Change Your Wife? ==
Why Change Your Wife?, directed by Cecil B. DeMille, was one of Cowan’s most successful films. This film blazed a trail of “light and merry” films to follow it and included the wealth, clothing, and romance for which the 1920s are remembered. The film starred Gloria Swanson and Bebe Daniels and depicted the story of a man's marriage trials and tribulations between his first and second wives. The film cost $130,000 to produce and made $1,000,000. This was Cowan's first film that she wrote under director Cecil B. DeMille. At the time she was making only $25 a week, which was eventually raised to $60 per week. At first, DeMille dismissed her as a “failed writer” and believed her to be not capable of success. However, after the success of this film, and the many others she worked on with DeMille, she became one of his top writers and highest-paid staff members.

== Impact on the industry ==
The majority of Cowan's films revolve around the themes of marriage, divorce, love and infidelity. Cowan was a pioneer for women's writers in film. She was joined in her time by two other prominent women writers in the industry, Frances Marion and June Mathis. Cowan was one of the first American writers to travel abroad to Europe and work with foreign directors. She has written and received writing credit on numerous famous films from the 1920s and '30s.

== Personal life ==
Cowan was married two times, with both marriages resulting in divorce. Her first marriage was to Frederick James Pitt. In 1929, Cowan remarried to Dr. Ernest L. Commons. After her second marriage, Cowan's whereabouts were relatively unknown, with many speculating she was traveling around Europe or the Orient. However, in 1932 that she came back into the picture of American writers.

== Death ==
Cowan died on July 31, 1943, at the age of 60, in Los Angeles. The final film that she worked on was Samson and Delilah was released in 1950, seven years after she died.

== Filmography ==
- The Woman Under Cover (dir. George Siegmann, 1919)
- Why Change Your Wife? (dir. Cecil B. DeMille, 1920)
- Seeds of Vengeance (dir. Ollie Sellers, 1920) - Screenplay based on a novel by Margaret Prescott Montague
- Hush (dir. Harry Garson, 1921)
- Straight from Paris (dir. Harry Garson, 1921)
- Courage (dir. Sidney Franklin, 1921) - Screenplay based on a story by Andrew Soutar
- Charge It (dir. Harry Garson, 1921)
- What No Man Knows (dir. Harry Garson, 1921)
- Fool's Paradise (dir. Cecil B. DeMille, 1921) - Screenplay based on a story by Leonard Merrick
- The Worldly Madonna (dir. Harry Garson, 1921)
- Brass (dir. Sidney Franklin, 1923) - Screenplay based on a novel by Charles Gilman Norris
- The Rustle of Silk (dir. Herbert Brenon, 1923) - Screenplay based on a novel by Cosmo Hamilton
- Bluebeard's 8th Wife (dir. Sam Wood, 1923) - Screenplay based on a play by Alfred Savoir
- The Silent Partner (dir. Charles Maigne, 1923) - Screenplay based on newspaper articles by Maximilian Foster
- Fashion Row (dir. Robert Z. Leonard, 1923)
- Lucretia Lombard (dir. Jack Conway, 1923) - Screenplay based on a novel by Kathleen Norris
- Don't Doubt Your Husband (dir. Harry Beaumont, 1924)
- Changing Husbands (dir. Paul Iribe and Frank Urson, 1924)
- Broken Barriers (dir. Reginald Barker, 1924) - Screenplay based on a novel by Meredith Nicholson
- East of Suez (dir. Raoul Walsh, 1925) - Screenplay based on a play by W. Somerset Maugham
- Smouldering Fires (dir. Clarence Brown, 1925)
- The Charmer (dir. Sidney Olcott, 1925)
- In the Name of Love (dir. Howard Higgin, 1925) - Screenplay based on The Lady of Lyons by Edward Bulwer-Lytton
- The Trouble with Wives (dir. Malcolm St. Clair, 1925)
- The New Commandment (dir. Howard Higgin, 1925) - Screenplay based on a novel by Frederick Palmer
- The Reckless Lady (dir. Howard Higgin, 1926) - Screenplay based on a story by Philip Gibbs
- Mismates (dir. Charles Brabin, 1926) - Screenplay based on a play by Myron C. Fagan
- Stand and Deliver (dir. Donald Crisp, 1928)
- Woman in the Dark (dir. Phil Rosen, 1934) - Screenplay based on a story by Dashiell Hammett
- Forbidden Heaven (dir. Reginald Barker, 1935) - Screenplay based on a story by Christine Jope-Slade
- Stop, Look and Love (dir. Otto Brower, 1939) - Screenplay based on a play by Harry Delf
