= Arizona Bound =

Arizona Bound may refer to:

- Arizona Bound (1941 film), a 1941 American film
- Arizona Bound (1927 film), a lost 1927 American Western silent film
