= Fashion Row =

1923 silent film by Robert Z. Leonard

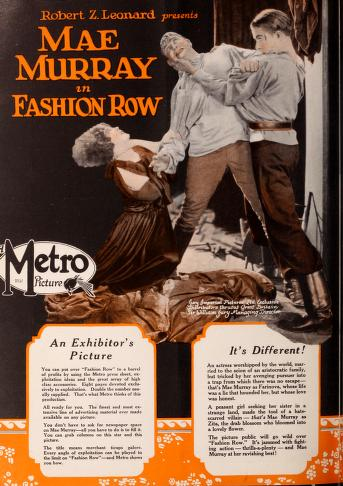
- Directed by: Robert Z. Leonard
- Written by: Alfred A. Cohn; Sada Cowan; Howard Higgin
- Produced by: Robert Z. Leonard
- Starring: Mae Murray; Earle Foxe; Freeman Wood
- Cinematography: Oliver T. Marsh
- Production company: Tiffany Pictures
- Distributed by: Metro Pictures
- Release date: December 3, 1923
- Running time: 70 minutes
- Country: United States
- Language: Silent (English intertitles)

Fashion Row is a lost 1923 American silent drama film directed by Robert Z. Leonard and starring Mae Murray in a dual role, Earle Foxe, and Freeman Wood. The film involves two Russian sisters emigrate to America. One tries to hide her peasant origins and rises in high society, while the other remains closer to her roots.

== Plot ==
As described in a film magazine review, Russian Olga Farinova becomes a famous actress in New York City. Under the pretense of being of noble birth, she weds a young millionaire. When her sister Zita arrives, she is at first disowned by Olga. A message declaring that Zita is ill lures Olga to the East Side. Olga is trapped there by an old suitor seeking revenge, shot, and dies in her husband's embrace. Zita is then adopted by the millionaire's family.

== Cast ==
- Mae Murray as Olga Farinova / Zita
- Earle Foxe as James Morton
- Freeman Wood as Eric Van Corland
- Mathilde Brundage as Mrs. Van Corland
- Elmo Lincoln as Kaminoff
- Sidney Franklin as Papa Levitzky
- Rosa Rosanova as Mama Levitzky
- Craig Biddle Jr. as Press Agent

== Preservation ==
With no holdings located in archives, Fashion Row is considered a lost film.

== Bibliography ==
- Michael G. Ankerich (2012). Mae Murray: The Girl with the Bee-stung Lips. University Press of Kentucky. ISBN 978-0-8131-3690-5
