= Mismates =

1926 film by Charles Brabin

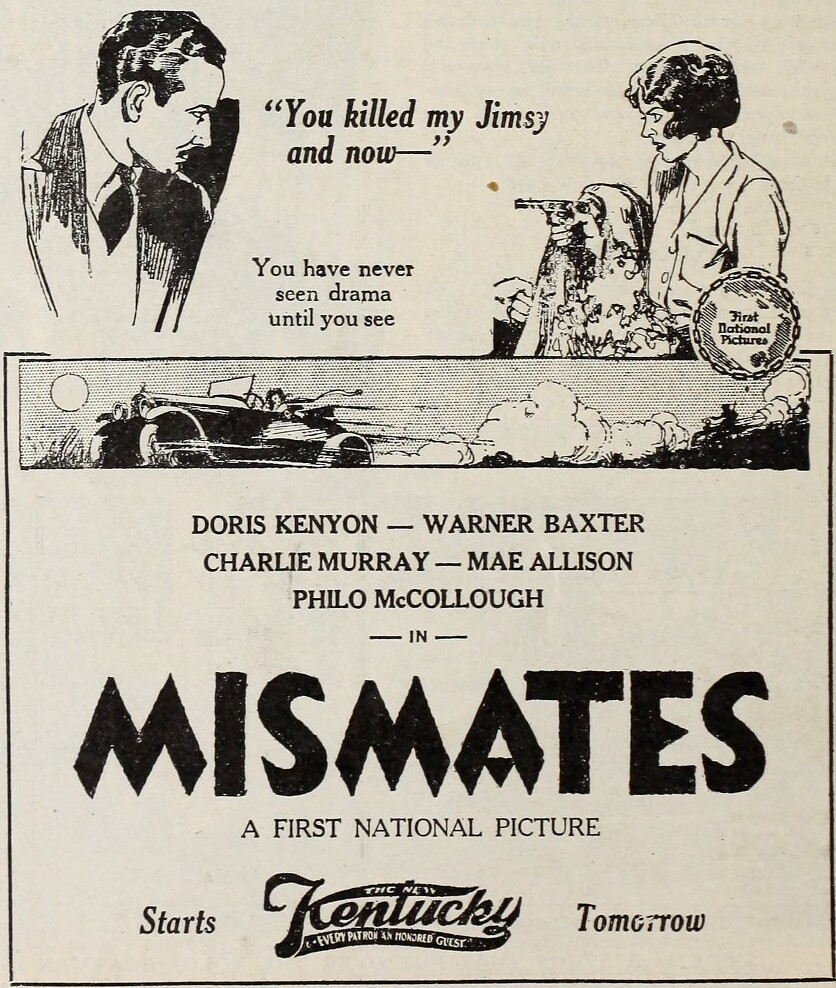
- Advertisement
- Directed by: Charles Brabin
- Written by: Sada Cowan from a play by Myron C. Fagan
- Produced by: First National Pictures
- Starring: Doris Kenyon; Warner Baxter
- Distributed by: First National Pictures
- Release date: July 26, 1926
- Running time: 70 minutes; 7 reels(2,104 meters)
- Country: United States
- Languages: Silent film English intertitles

Mismates is a 1926 silent film starring Doris Kenyon and Warner Baxter. The movie was written by Sada Cowan from a play by Myron C. Fagan and directed by Charles Brabin. This film is now lost.

== Cast (in credits order) ==
- Doris Kenyon as Judy Winslow
- Warner Baxter as Ted Carroll
- May Allison as Belle
- Philo McCullough as Jim Winslow
- Charles Murray as Black
- Maude Turner Gordon as Mrs. Winslow
- John Kolb as Watson
- Julius Briner as The Cook
- Cyril Ring as Helwig
- Nancy Kelly as Jimsy (future film star Kelly was a child actress at this time)
