= The New Commandment (film) =

1925 film

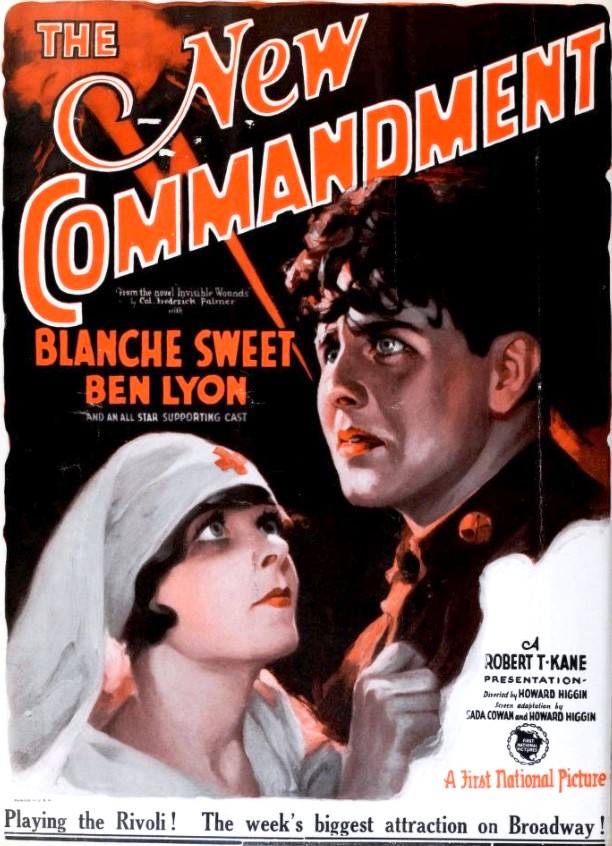
- Advertisement
- Directed by: Howard Higgin
- Screenplay by: Sada Cowan; Howard Higgin
- Based on: Invisible Wounds by Frederick Palmer
- Produced by: Robert Kane
- Starring: Blanche Sweet; Ben Lyon; Holbrook Blinn; Clare Eames; Effie Shannon; Dorothy Cumming
- Cinematography: Ernest Haller
- Edited by: Paul F. Maschke
- Production company: First National Pictures
- Distributed by: First National Pictures
- Release date: November 1, 1925
- Running time: 70 minutes
- Country: United States
- Language: Silent (English intertitles)

The New Commandment is a 1925 American silent drama film directed by Howard Higgin and written by Sada Cowan and Howard Higgin. It is based on the 1925 novel Invisible Wounds by Frederick Palmer. The film stars Blanche Sweet, Ben Lyon, Holbrook Blinn, Clare Eames, Effie Shannon, and Dorothy Cumming. The film was released on November 1, 1925, by First National Pictures.

== Plot ==
Having set out on a cruise with his father for Europe, Billy Morrow discovers the true purpose of that trip which, organized by Mrs. Parr, an intriguing high society lady who has buried three husbands, now plans to marry him to his stepdaughter. Off the French coast, Billy decides to leave the ship and heads ashore with Red, a former taxi driver who has become his friend. In Paris, the two meet the artist Gaston Picard. Although he is engaged to Countess Stoll, he is in love with his American model Renée Darcourt. Billy also falls in love with her, but he can't convince himself of Renée's honesty, either because of her profession or because he suspects that she is having an affair with Picard. When war breaks out, Billy enlisted, joining the Foreign Legion. During a fight, he is injured. Taken to a hospital, he finds Renée there, who works there as a nurse. Doubts and jealousies vanish: lovers, finding themselves, forget all suspicions, happily reunited.

== Cast ==
- Blanche Sweet as Renee Darcourt
- Ben Lyon as Billy Morrow
- Holbrook Blinn as William Morrow
- Clare Eames as Mrs. Parr
- Effie Shannon as Marquise de la Salle
- Dorothy Cumming as Countess Stoll
- Pedro de Cordoba as Picard
- George Cooper as Red
- Diana Kane as Ethel
- Lucius J. Henderson as Henri Darcourt
- Betty Jewel
- William Powell (uncredited)

== Preservation ==
With no prints of The New Commandment located in any film archives, it is a lost film.
