= Why Change Your Wife? =

1920 film

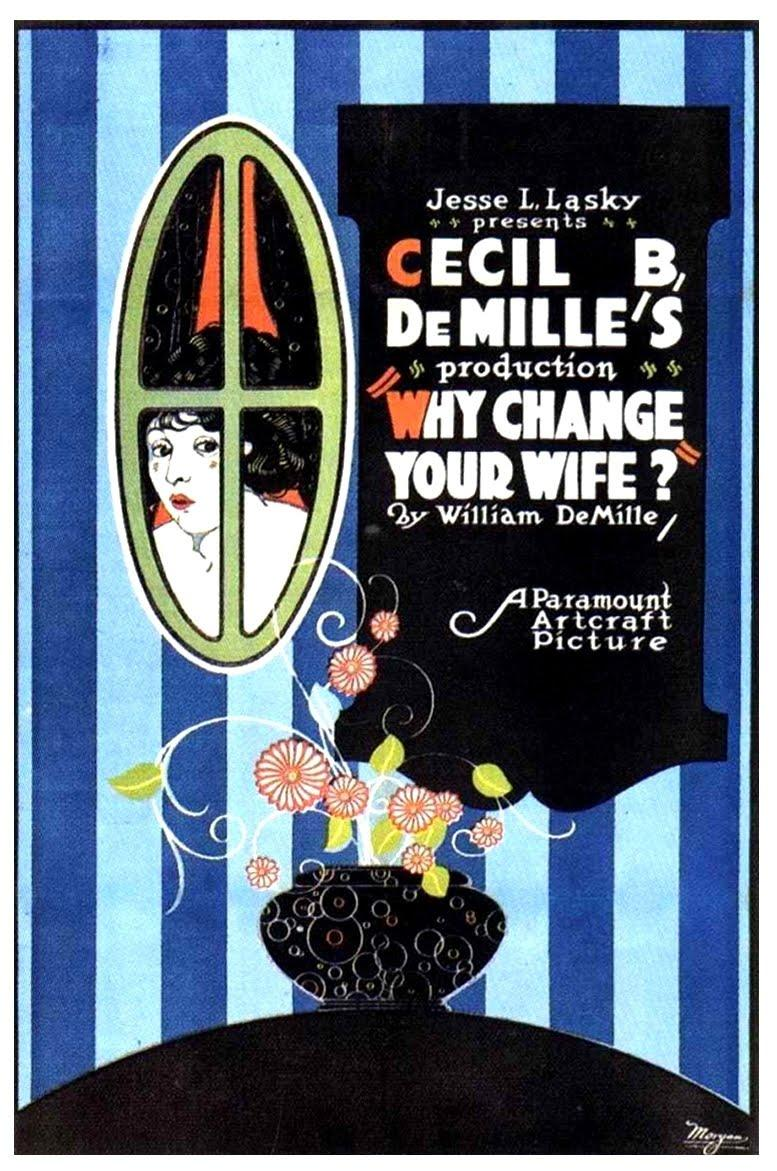
- Film poster
- Directed by: Cecil B. DeMille
- Written by: Sada Cowan; Olga Printzlau
- Story by: William C. deMille
- Produced by: Cecil B. DeMille; Jesse L. Lasky
- Starring: Gloria Swanson
- Cinematography: Alvin Wyckoff
- Edited by: Anne Bauchens
- Production company: Famous Players–Lasky/Artcraft
- Distributed by: Paramount Pictures
- Release date: April 24, 1920
- Running time: 90 minutes
- Country: United States
- Languages: Silent; English intertitles
- Budget: $129,349.31
- Box office: $1 million

Why Change Your Wife?

Why Change Your Wife? is a 1920 American silent comedy film directed by Cecil B. DeMille and starring Gloria Swanson.

== Plot ==
Frumpy wife Beth devotes herself to bettering her husband's mind and expanding his appreciation for the finer things in life, such as classical music. When he goes shopping at a lingerie store to buy some sexier clothes for her, he meets Sally, the shop girl. Rejected by his wife for a night out in town, he takes Sally, who douses him with her perfume. When Beth smells another woman's perfume, she kicks him out and files for divorce.

Beth's Aunt Kate takes her shopping to distract her from her broken heart. While in the dress shop, Beth overhears women gossiping about how her dull appearance led to her losing her husband. She determines to "play their game" and gets a new "indecent" wardrobe. Meanwhile, the manipulative Sally convinces the dejected Robert to marry her. He finds that his second wife annoys him as much as his previous one.

Later, the couple and their dog end up at the same luxury hotel where divorcee Beth is strutting her stuff. She tries to seduce Robert, but he resists. They quickly leave the situation, but they meet again on a train. Robert slips on a banana peel as they walk away from the station. When the police arrive on the scene, Beth identifies Robert as her husband and takes him home. Doctors say he is to be kept quiet for 24 hours.

The two women argue whether Sally will move Robert against the doctor's orders. Beth locks the three of them into the bedroom, leading to a physical struggle over the key during which Sally breaks a mirror, inviting seven years' bad luck. Beth threatens to burn Sally's face with acid, which leads to a stalemate. The three stay in the room until Robert's crisis is over. A doctor pronounces him healthy, but Robert refuses to go home with Sally. Sally throws the vial of acid on Beth's face only to discover that Beth was bluffing; the vial contained only eye wash.

Sally leaves but not before taking the cash from Robert's pants pockets and declaring that the best thing about marriage is alimony.

The final scenes show the remarried Robert and Beth in their home. Beth dresses in more revealing clothes and replaces the classical recording on her Victrola with a foxtrot record. Sally has taken up with a violin player. The intertitle that ends the film reassures ladies that their husbands would prefer them as sweethearts and reminds them to make sure they remember, from time to time, to "forget" being a wife.

== Cast ==
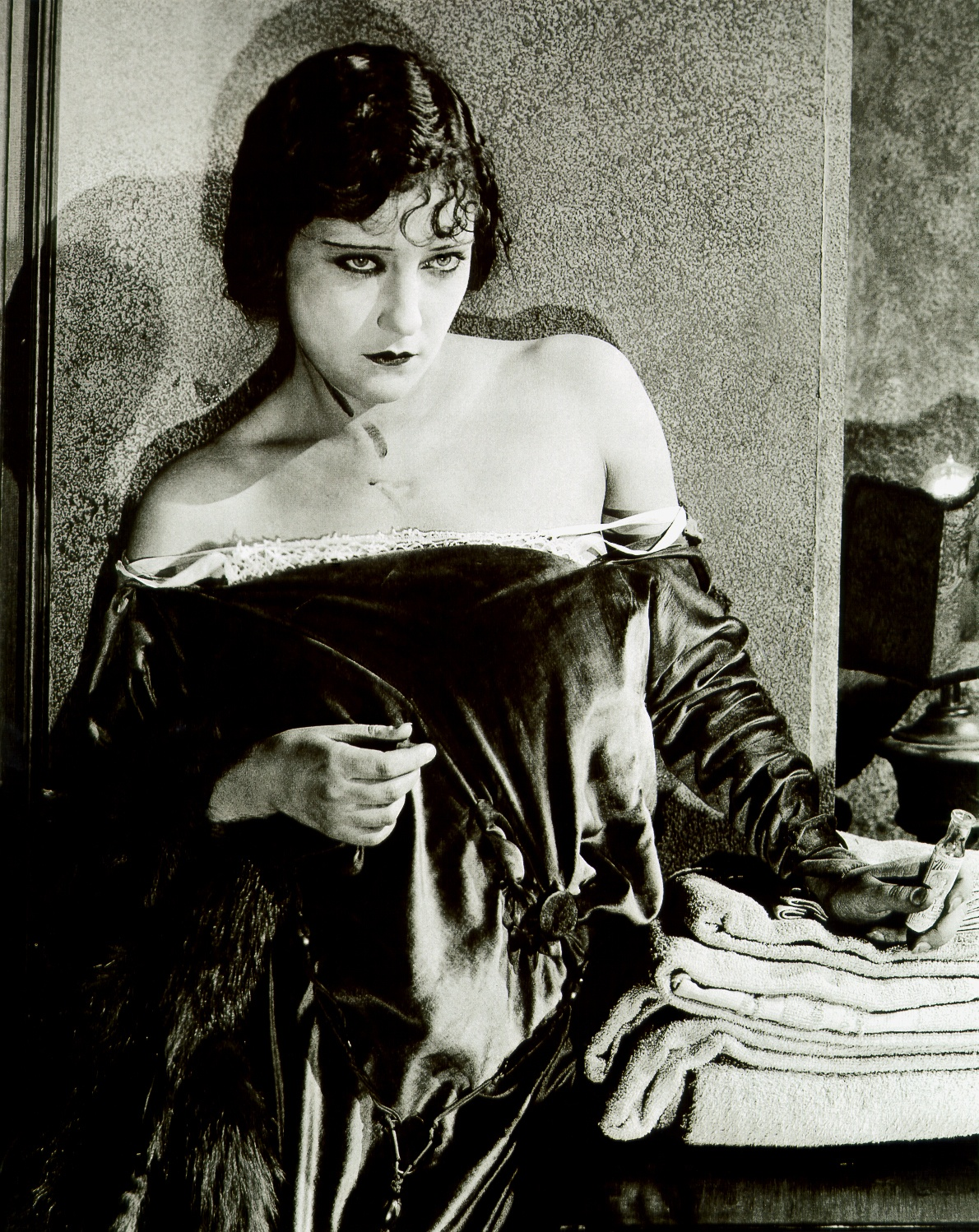
Gloria Swanson in a production still from the film

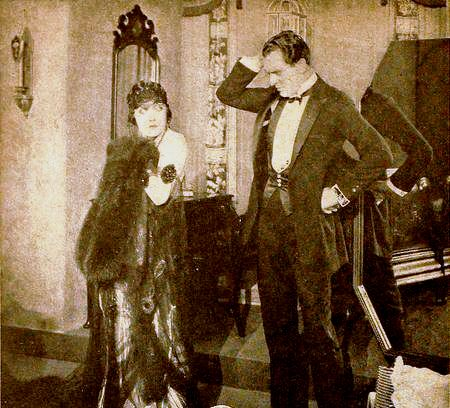
Gloria Swanson and Thomas Meighan

- Gloria Swanson as Beth Gordon
- Thomas Meighan as Robert Gordon
- Bebe Daniels as Sally Clark
- Theodore Kosloff as Radinioff
- Sylvia Ashton as Aunt Kate
- Clarence Geldart as The Doctor
- Mayme Kelso as Harriette
- Lucien Littlefield as Butler
- Edna Mae Cooper as Maid
- Jane Wolfe as Woman Client
- William Boyd as Naval Officer at Hotel (uncredited)
- Clarence Burton as Party Guest Dozing (uncredited)
- Julia Faye as Girl in Bathing Suit (uncredited)
- Madame Sul-Te-Wan as Sally's Maid (uncredited)

== Alterations ==
In Pennsylvania, the state film censor board made 22 cuts before the film could be passed for exhibition.

== Preservation status ==
A 35mm print of this film exists at the George Eastman House film archive.
