= The Trouble with Wives =

1925 film

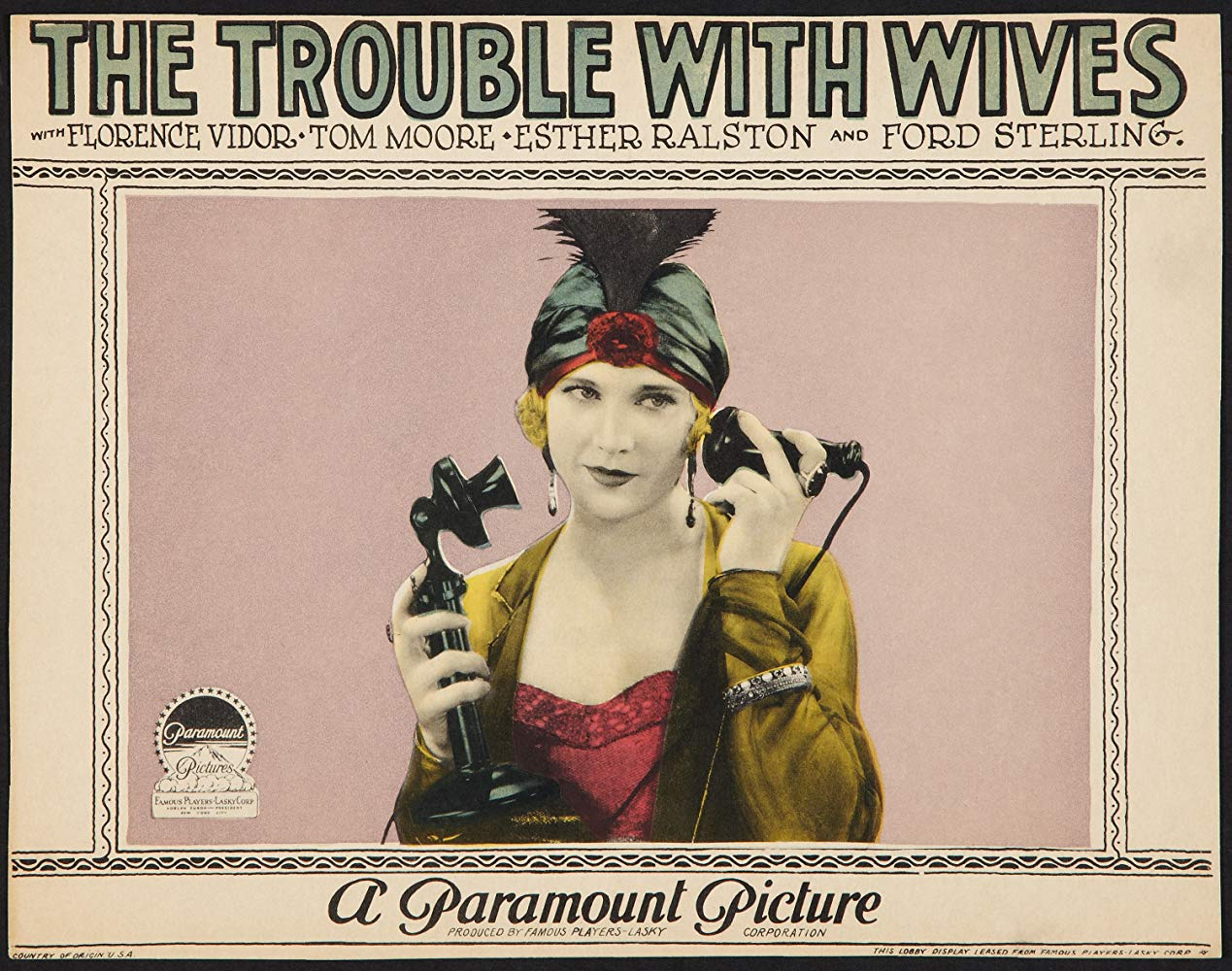
- Lobby card
- Directed by: Malcolm St. Clair
- Screenplay by: Sada Cowan; Howard Higgin
- Produced by: Jesse L. Lasky; Adolph Zukor
- Starring: Florence Vidor; Tom Moore; Esther Ralston; Ford Sterling; Lucy Beaumont; Edgar Kennedy
- Cinematography: L. Guy Wilky
- Production company: Famous Players–Lasky Corporation
- Distributed by: Paramount Pictures
- Release date: September 28, 1925
- Running time: 70 minutes
- Country: United States
- Language: Silent (English intertitles)

The Trouble with Wives is a 1925 American silent comedy film directed by Malcolm St. Clair, written by Sada Cowan and Howard Higgin, and starring Florence Vidor, Tom Moore, Esther Ralston, Ford Sterling, Lucy Beaumont, and Edgar Kennedy. It was released on September 28, 1925, by Paramount Pictures.

== Plot ==
As described in a film magazine reviews, Grace Hyatt suspects her businessman husband William of being infatuated with his shoe designer from Paris. Several situations develop which make it appear that William is interested in the young woman. Al Hennessey tells Grace that he and William have visited the woman's apartment. William becomes so uncomfortable with the situation at home that he leaves for a summer hotel. Grace determines that she will get a divorce. When she visits the hotel, she finds the other woman there is the bride of Al Hennessey. The Hyatts are reconciled.

== Cast ==
- Florence Vidor as Grace Hyatt
- Tom Moore as William Hyatt
- Esther Ralston as Dagmar
- Ford Sterling as Al Hennessey
- Lucy Beaumont as Grace's Mother
- Edgar Kennedy as Detective
- Etta Lee as Maid
- William Courtright as Butler

== Production ==
A key scene from The Trouble With Wives demonstrates the “extraordinary efforts” that director St. Clair went to in order to eliminate intertitles: The young wife (Florence Vidor) is led to suspect her husband (Tom Moore) of infidelities with blonde vamp (Esther Ralston). The sequence is conducted entirely in cinematic pantomime related to the wife by her husband's friend (Ford Sterling).

St. Clair, a cartoonist and graphic artist, designed and drew his own intertitles at Paramount when they were required.

== Theme ==
“The satirical point in The Trouble With Wives is the male assumption regarding the way women handle money,” and conversely “that all wives inevitably fall into the trap of becoming suspicious of their husbands.”

== Preservation ==
With no prints of The Trouble with Wives located in any film archives, it is a lost film.
