= The Woman Under Cover =

1919 film by George Siegmann

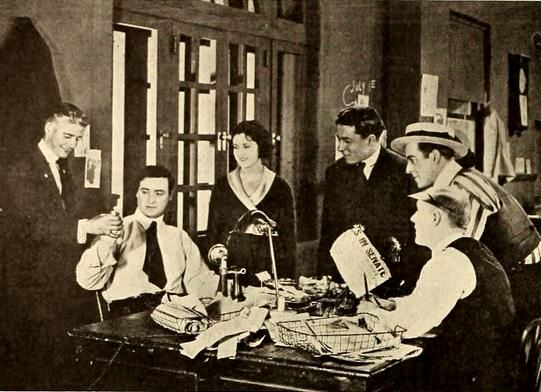
- Still from a film magazine
- Directed by: George Siegmann
- Written by: Harvey Thew
- Based on: Playing the Game by Sada Cowan
- Produced by: Carl Laemmle
- Starring: Fritzi Brunette
- Cinematography: Alfred Gosden
- Distributed by: Universal Film Manufacturing Company
- Release date: September 15, 1919
- Running time: 6 reels
- Country: United States
- Language: Silent (English intertitles)

The Woman Under Cover is a lost 1919 American silent drama film directed by George Siegmann and starring Fritzi Brunette. It was based on a play by Sada Cowan and produced and distributed by the Universal Film Manufacturing Company.

== Plot ==
As described in a film magazine, Yvonne, an actress, murders her husband following a quarrel, and upon threat of exposure promises to marry Billy, a chorus man who has discovered her guilt. When she refuses to carry out her agreement and accepts the attentions of a wealthy broker, Billy tells his story to The Leader, a newspaper. Mac, the city editor, assigns Alma, a woman reporter, the task of securing Yvonne's confession to verify the story that was given to the newspaper. She is a sister of Billy but is unaware of his involvement in the story. After securing the confession, Alma discovers Billy's involvement, but still telephones her scoop to the newspaper. Much to her surprise, the exposure of her brother's involvement fails to discourage the love of Mac for her, and the final closeup finds Mac and Alma married.

== Cast ==
- Fritzi Brunette as Alma Jordan
- George A. McDaniel as Mac (credited as George McDaniel)
- Harry Spingler as Billy Jordan
- Fontaine La Rue as Yvonne Leclaire
- Edward Cecil
- Carl Stockdale
- Fred Gamble
- Marian Skinner (credited as Marion Skinner)
