= Betty Jewel =

American actress (1899–1963)

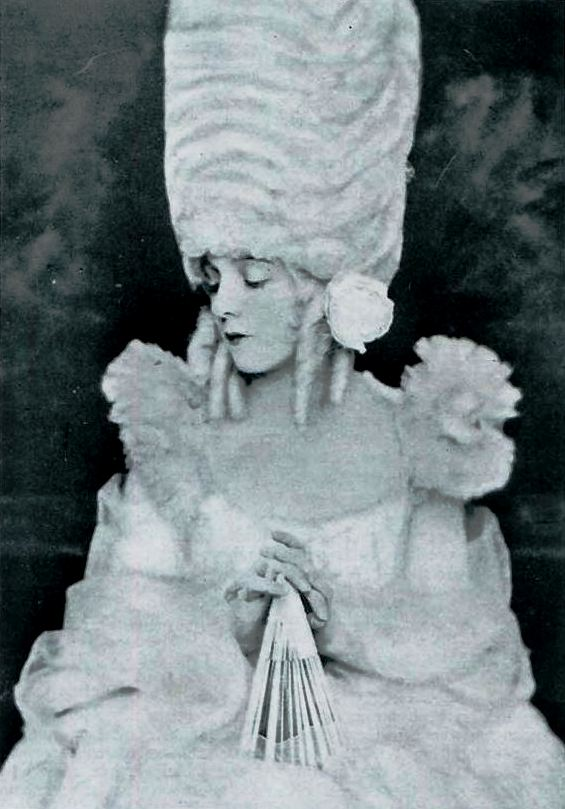
- Still from Orphans of the Storm (1921)
- Born: Julia Baroni; April 29, 1899; Omaha, Nebraska, US
- Died: October 20, 1963 (aged 64); Alton, Illinois, US
- Occupation: Actress
- Spouses: Max Schlesinger (divorced): Frank Elfred

Betty Jewel (born Julia Baroni; April 29, 1899 – October 20, 1963) was an American actress active in the 1920s.

== Biography ==
Betty was born in Omaha to an Italian father, Attilio, and a French mother (who seems to have died when Betty was young). She later graduated from a convent before deciding to pursue a career in show business. Early on, she was a Ziegfeld showgirl. Her father owned a number of Italian restaurants, and he managed to secure his daughter a meeting with D.W. Griffith through some of his customers.

Griffith took a liking to her and christened her "The Third Orphan of the Storm" (the other two being Dorothy and Lillian Gish). Soon she was tapped to feature in films like The Silent Command and The New Commandment; she'd later win star status in Westerns like The Mysterious Rider and Arizona Bound. She reportedly spent a year learning to ride horses at Griffith Park in Los Angeles, California, to prepare for roles in these Westerns.

She married Max Schlesinger in 1927; the pair eventually divorced, at which point she seems to have retired from the business. She later married Frank Elfred. She was also briefly linked to British actor Ronald Colman.

== Filmography ==
- Orphans of the Storm (1921)
- The Silent Command (1923)
- Mile-a-Minute Romeo (1923)
- The Necessary Evil (1925)
- The New Commandment (1925)
- Partners Again (1926)
- The Mysterious Rider (1927)
- Arizona Bound (1927)
- The Last Outlaw (1927)
