= Broken Barriers (1924 film) =

1924 film by Reginald Barker

- Lobby card
- Directed by: Reginald Barker
- Written by: Sada Cowan; Howard Higgin
- Based on: Broken Barriers by Meredith Nicholson
- Starring: James Kirkwood; Norma Shearer; Adolphe Menjou
- Cinematography: Percy Hilburn (*French)
- Distributed by: Metro-Goldwyn-Mayer
- Release date: August 3, 1924 (United States)
- Running time: 60 mins.
- Country: United States
- Language: Silent (English intertitles)

Broken Barriers is a 1924 American silent drama film starring James Kirkwood, Norma Shearer, and Adolphe Menjou. Directed by Reginald Barker, the film is based upon the novel of the same name by Meredith Nicholson.

== Plot ==
Grace Durland (Shearer) is a young debutante who is forced to leave college when her father goes bankrupt. While working for a living, she falls in love with Ward Trenton (Kirkwood) who is married. As she reveals her love for a married man to her family, the reaction is very negative. Ward's evil wife refuses to grant him a divorce. This changes when he is injured in a car accident.

== Cast ==
- James Kirkwood as Ward Trenton
- Norma Shearer as Grace Durland
- Adolphe Menjou as Tommy Kemp
- Mae Busch as Irene Kirby
- George Fawcett as Mr. Durland
- Margaret McWade as Mrs. Durland
- Robert Agnew as Bobbie Durland
- Ruth Stonehouse as Ethel Durland
- Robert Frazer as John Moore
- Winifred Bryson as Mrs. Ward Trenton
- Vera Reynolds as Sadie Denton
- Edythe Chapman as Beulah Reynolds
- George Kuwa as Chang

== Preservation ==
With no copies of Broken Barriers located in any film archives, it is a lost film.
