= A Holy Terror =

1931 film directed by Irving Cummings

- Directed by: Irving Cummings
- Written by: Ralph Block; Alfred A. Cohn; Myron C. Fagan
- Based on: Trailin'! by Max Brand
- Produced by: Edmund Grainger
- Starring: George O'Brien; Sally Eilers; Rita La Roy; Humphrey Bogart
- Cinematography: George Schneiderman
- Edited by: Ralph Dixon
- Distributed by: Fox Film Corporation
- Release date: July 19, 1931
- Running time: 53 minutes
- Country: United States
- Language: English

A Holy Terror is a 1931 American pre-Code Western movie starring George O'Brien, Sally Eilers, Rita La Roy, and Humphrey Bogart. The film is an adaptation by Ralph Block, Alfred A. Cohn, and Myron C. Fagan of the novel Trailin'! by Max Brand. It was directed by Irving Cummings.

== Plot ==
Polo player Tony Bard travels West to investigate his father's murder, and meets Jerry Foster on a Wyoming ranch. After being kidnapped, Tony escapes and discovers his true father. He also learns that he was raised by another man, who was in love with his mother.

== Cast ==
- George O'Brien as Tony Bard aka "Woodbury"
- Sally Eilers as Jerry Foster
- Rita La Roy as Kitty Carroll
- Humphrey Bogart as Steve Nash
- James Kirkwood as William Drew
- Stanley Fields as Butch Morgan
- Robert Warwick as John Bard aka "Thomas Woodbury"
- Richard Tucker as Tom Hedges
- Earl Pingree as Jim Lawler, Ranch Manager
- Ralph Bucko as Wrangler (uncredited)
- George Chandler as Joe, Western Union Clerk (uncredited)
- Wong Chung as Cook (uncredited)
- John Elliott as Sheriff (uncredited)
- Bud Geary as Tony's Chauffeur (uncredited)
- Otto Han as Houseboy (uncredited)
- Walter Hiers as Traveling Salesman (uncredited)
- Fred Kohler, Jr. as Party Guest (uncredited)
- Jerry Mandy as Louie, the Barber (uncredited)
- Franklin Parker as Hotel Clerk (uncredited)
- Julian Rivero as Woodbury's Butler (uncredited)
- Oscar Smith as Stuttering Servant (uncredited)
- Slim Whitaker as Johnson (uncredited)
- Jay Wilsey as Cowboy (uncredited)
