= The Reckless Lady =

1926 film

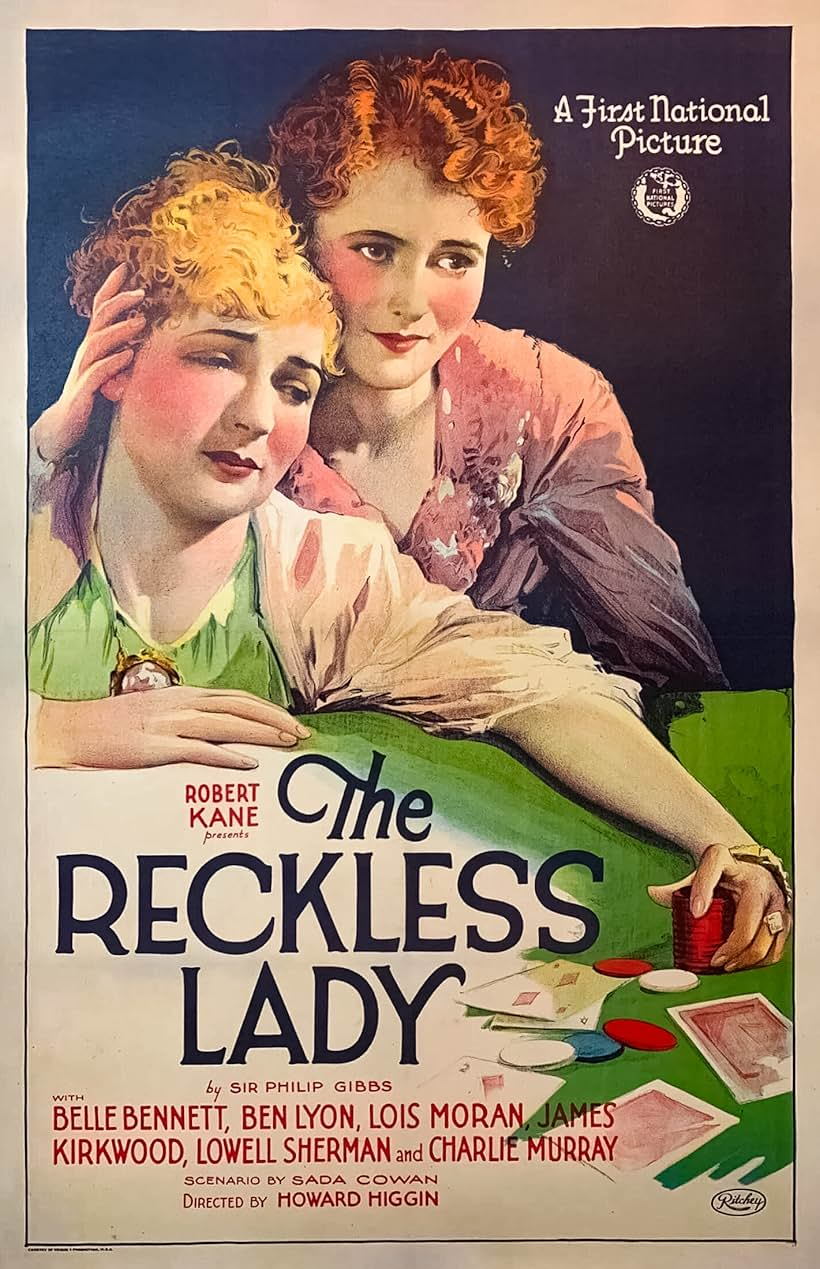
- Directed by: Howard Higgin
- Written by: Sada Cowan
- Based on: Philip Gibbs
- Produced by: Robert Kane
- Starring: Belle Bennett
- Cinematography: Ernest Haller
- Production company: First National Pictures
- Distributed by: First National Pictures
- Release date: January 24, 1926
- Running time: 80 minutes
- Country: United States
- Language: Silent (English intertitles)

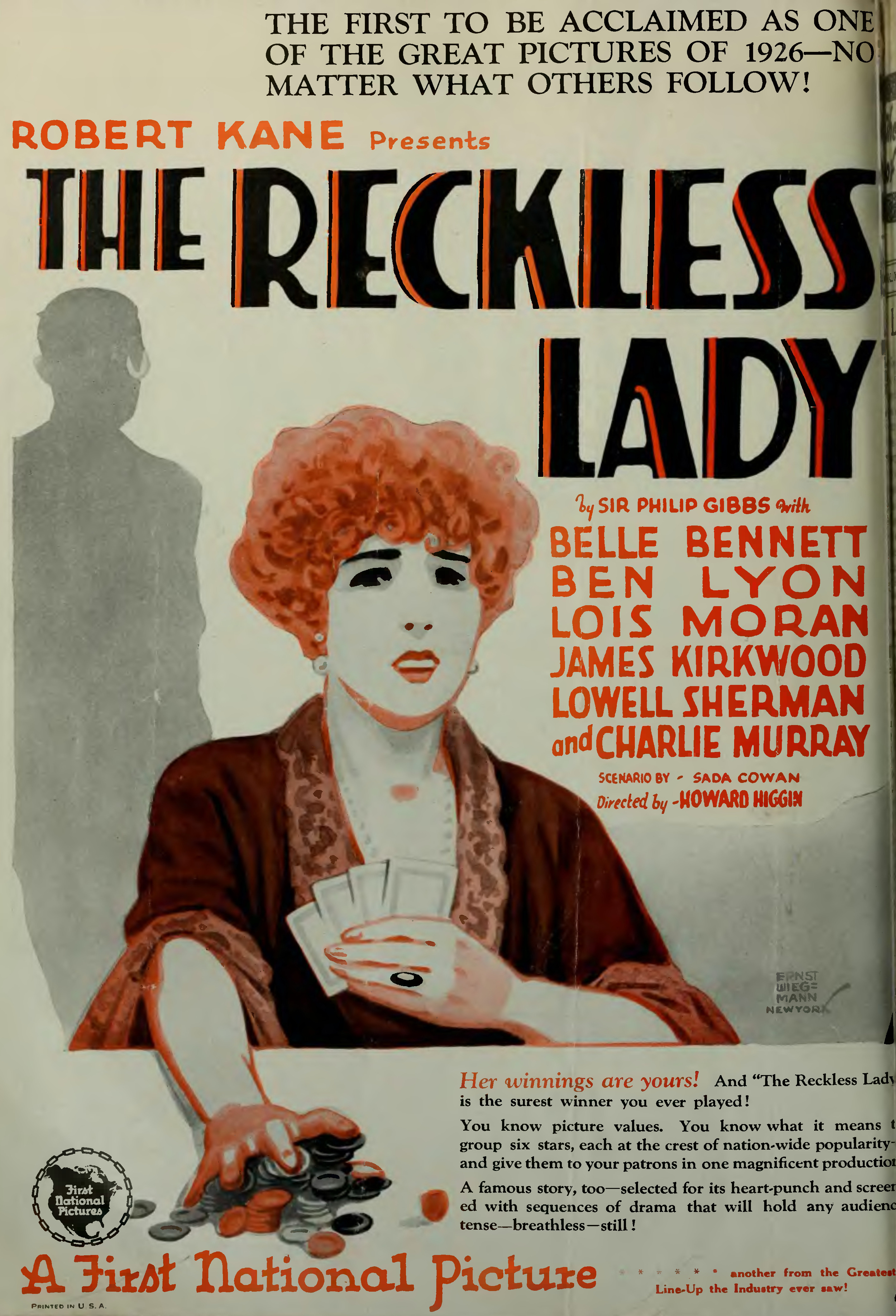
The Reckless Lady ad in The Film Daily, 1926

The Reckless Lady is a 1926 American silent drama film directed by Howard Higgin and starring Belle Bennett, Lois Moran, James Kirkwood, and Lowell Sherman.

== Plot ==
As described in a film magazine review, the attentions of Feodor, a Russian, to Mrs. Fleming results in her husband, Colonel Fleming, leaving her. The wife retains the child Sylvia. Years later Mrs. Fleming is gambling in Monte Carlo. Feodor reappears and has sex with Sylvia. The American Ralph Hillier was her other suiter. Mrs. Fleming attempts to commit suicide but is saved by Ralph and her husband. The Colonel pursues Feodor, who leaps over a cliff. The elder Fleming couple are reunited, and Sylvia accepts Ralph.

== Cast ==
- Belle Bennett as Mrs. Fleming
- James Kirkwood as Colonel Fleming
- Lois Moran as Sylvia Fleming
- Lowell Sherman as Feodor
- Ben Lyon as Ralph Hillier
- Marcia Harris as Sophie
- Charles Murray as Gendarme
- Lucia Backus Seger as Fortune Teller
- Barbara Barondess as Minor Role (uncredited)
- Thomas Holding as Minor Role (uncredited)

== Preservation ==
With no prints of The Reckless Lady located in any film archives, it is a lost film.
