= Changing Husbands =

1924 film

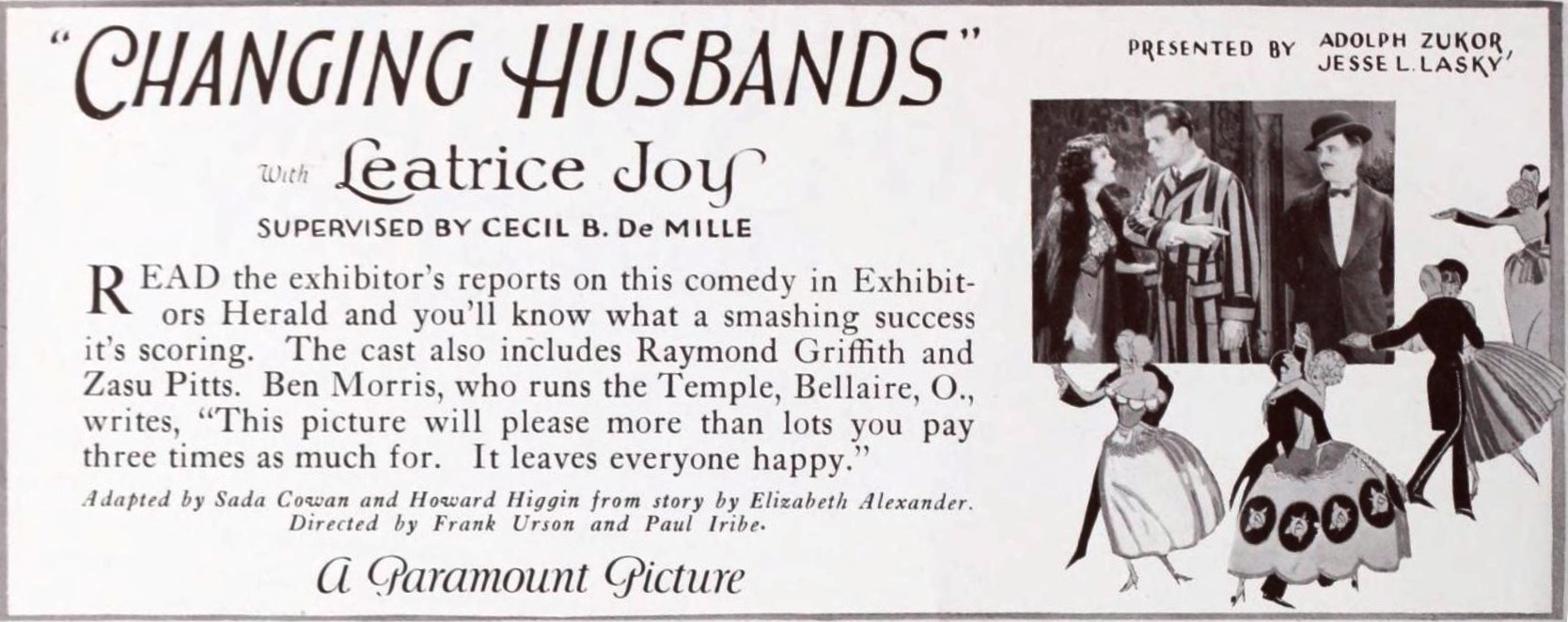
- Advertisement
- Directed by: Paul Iribe; Frank Urson; Rupert Julian (uncredited)
- Written by: Sada Cowan; Howard Higgin
- Based on: Roles by Elizabeth Alexander
- Produced by: Adolph Zukor; Jesse Lasky
- Starring: Leatrice Joy
- Cinematography: Bert Glennon
- Distributed by: Paramount Pictures
- Release date: June 22, 1924
- Running time: 70 minutes; 7 reels (6,799 feet)
- Country: United States
- Language: Silent (English intertitles)

Changing Husbands is a 1924 American silent comedy film starring Leatrice Joy and Victor Varconi, directed by Paul Iribe and Frank Urson, and written by Sada Cowan and Howard Higgin. The runtime of the film is 70 minutes.

== Cast ==
- Leatrice Joy as Gwynne Evans / Eva Graham
- Victor Varconi as Oliver Evans
- Raymond Griffith as Bob Hamilton
- Julia Faye as Mitzi
- ZaSu Pitts as Delia
- Helen Dunbar as Mrs. Evans
- William Boyd as Conrad Bardshaw
- Monte Collins as Stagehand (uncredited)
- Gale Henry as Waitress (uncredited)
- Guy Oliver as Director (uncredited)

== Preservation ==
A print of Changing Husbands is preserved in the Library of Congress collection.
