= The Necessary Evil =

1925 film

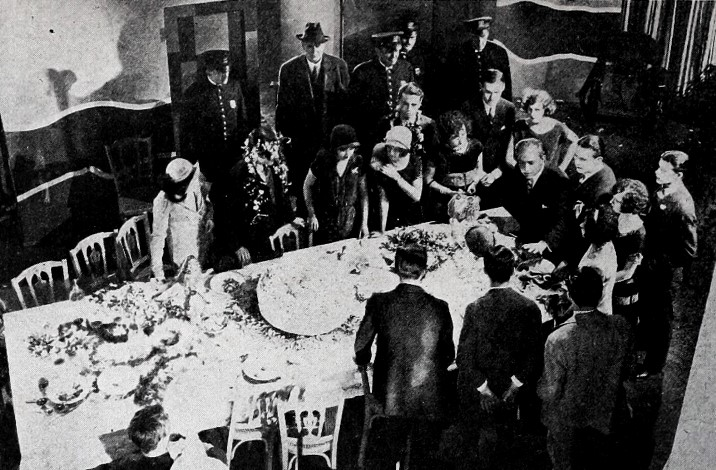
- Still of a scene rehearsal
- Directed by: George Archainbaud
- Written by: Stephen Vincent Benét; Eve Unsell
- Starring: Ben Lyon; Viola Dana; Frank Mayo
- Cinematography: George J. Folsey
- Edited by: Arthur Tavares
- Production company: First National Pictures
- Distributed by: First National Pictures
- Release date: May 17, 1925
- Running time: 70 minutes
- Country: United States
- Language: Silent (English intertitles)

The Necessary Evil is a lost 1925 American silent drama film directed by George Archainbaud and starring Ben Lyon, Viola Dana, and Frank Mayo.

The film's sets were designed by the art director Milton Menasco.

== Plot ==
As described in a film magazine review, Dick Jerome, adored of women and always forgiven of everything because of his good looks and disposition, has married the good and beautiful Frances, who was also loved by Dick's employer, David Devanant. Dick dies while assigned to South America, and David marries Shirley. David makes Dick's son Frank feel that he is an enemy. Frank learns of the method of his father's death and swears that he will break his stepfather. David sends Frank to South America, and he makes a man of himself. David writes a letter to his stepson, and when he returns he gives it to him to read. It provides to Frank proof of his father's unworthiness and states why David always acted as his stepson's enemy: so that he can face Frances in the beyond, knowing that he made a man of her son. Frank turns to find that David has died.

== Cast ==
- Ben Lyon as Frank Jerome
- Viola Dana as Shirley Holmes
- Frank Mayo as Dick Jerome
- Thomas Holding as David Devanant
- Gladys Brockwell as Frances Jerome
- Mary Thurman as Hattie
- Betty Jewel as Belle
- Martha O'Dwyer as Esther
- Arthur Housman as Pug
- Beach Cooke as Reggie
- Lucy Fox as Dancer (uncredited)

== Preservation ==
With no prints of The Necessary Evil located in any film archives, it is a lost film.
