= In the Name of Love (1925 film) =

1925 film

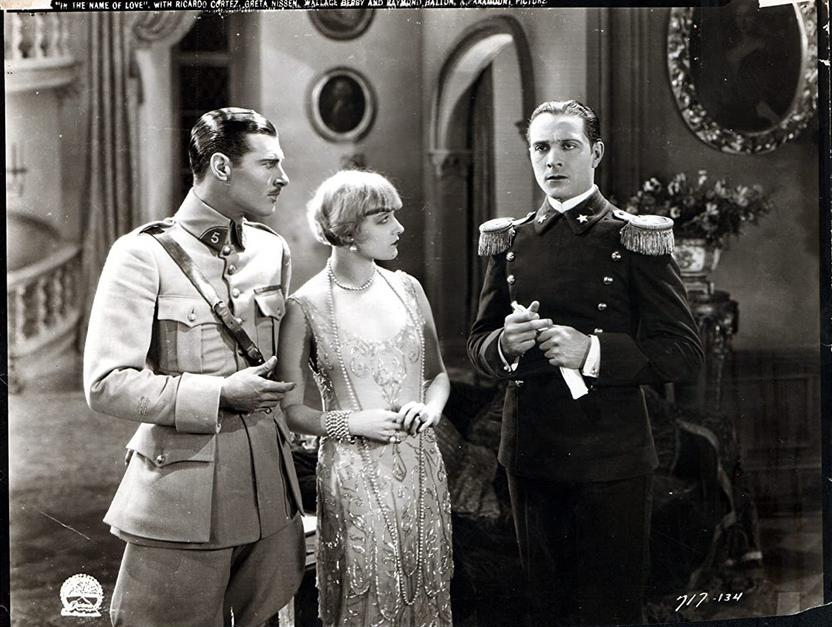
- Richard Arlen, Greta Nissen, and Ricardo Cortez in In the Name of Love
- Directed by: Howard Higgin
- Screenplay by: Sada Cowan
- Based on: The Lady of Lyons by Edward Bulwer-Lytton
- Produced by: Jesse L. Lasky; Adolph Zukor
- Starring: Ricardo Cortez; Greta Nissen; Wallace Beery; Raymond Hatton; Lillian Leighton; Edythe Chapman; Richard Arlen
- Cinematography: Charles Edgar Schoenbaum
- Production company: Famous Players–Lasky Corporation
- Distributed by: Paramount Pictures
- Release date: August 10, 1925
- Running time: 60 minutes
- Country: United States
- Language: Silent (English intertitles)

In the Name of Love is a 1925 American silent comedy film directed by Howard Higgin and written by Sada Cowan. It is based on the play The Lady of Lyons by Edward Bulwer-Lytton. It stars Ricardo Cortez, Greta Nissen, Wallace Beery, Raymond Hatton, Lillian Leighton, Edythe Chapman, and Richard Arlen. It was released on August 10, 1925, by Paramount Pictures.

== Plot ==
As described in a film magazine advertisement, Raoul Melnotte is a young Frenchman in love with his boyhood sweetheart Marie Dufrayne. He travels to the United States to make his fortune. Marie promises to wait for him.

Ten years later, Raoul returns to France without becoming rich. Marie has become wealthy and snobbish; she rejects Raoul. She has dated many men, but really wants to meet a Prince of Como, who is visiting France.

Glavis and the Marquis de Beausant suggest to Raoul that he masquerade as the Prince of Como, marry Marie, and then humiliate her. Playing the prince, Raoul romances Marie and then marries her. When Marie discovers that the prince is actually Raoul, she is livid. Her brother Dumas attacks Raoul. However, realizing that she still loves Raoul, Marie stops her brother from killing him.

== Cast ==
- Ricardo Cortez as Raoul Melnotte
- Greta Nissen as Marie Dufrayne
- Wallace Beery as Glavis
- Raymond Hatton as Marquis de Beausant
- Lillian Leighton as Mother Dufrayne
- Edythe Chapman as Mother Melnotte
- Richard Arlen as Dumas Dufrayne

== Preservation ==
With no prints of In the Name of Love located in any film archives, it is a lost film.
