= The Line-Up =

1934 American film

- Directed by: Howard Higgin
- Written by: George Waggner
- Produced by: Sid Rogell
- Starring: William Gargan; Marian Nixon; Paul Hurst
- Cinematography: Benjamin H. Kline
- Edited by: John Rawlins
- Production company: Columbia Pictures
- Distributed by: Columbia Pictures
- Release date: April 17, 1934
- Running time: 64 minutes
- Country: United States
- Language: English

The Line-Up is a 1934 American crime film directed by Howard Higgin and starring William Gargan, Marian Nixon and Paul Hurst.

== Plot ==
One of the detective squad's young new recruit officers is assigned with investigating a series of fur coat thefts. When he suspects a hotel hat check girl of being involved with the theft, he sets out to prove her innocence and identify the real thieves.

== Cast ==
- William Gargan as Bob Curtis
- Marian Nixon as Peggy Arnold
- Paul Hurst as Detective Sgt. Doyle
- John Miljan as Reginald Fields
- Harold Huber as 'Mile-a-Way' Miller
- Greta Meyer as Mrs. Peterson
- Joseph Crehan as Police Capt. Daniel McGrath
- Noel Francis as Mabel Martin
- Francis McDonald as Trigger - Henchman
- Charles A. Browne as Chuck
- John Bleifer as Louie
- Harry C. Bradley as Mr. Hamilton
- Wallis Clark as Hotel Manager
- Harry Holman as Jacob
- Jessie Perry as Mrs. Hamilton
- Frank Reicher as Abraham Schultz
- Emma Tansey as Mrs. Garvey
- Harry Tenbrook as Man in the Line-up

== Critical reception ==
Variety, "This one just misses being fair as entertainment."

== Bibliography ==
- Langman, Larry & Finn, Daniel. A Guide to American Crime Films of the Thirties. Greenwood Press, 1995.
