= Mile-a-Minute Romeo =

1923 film

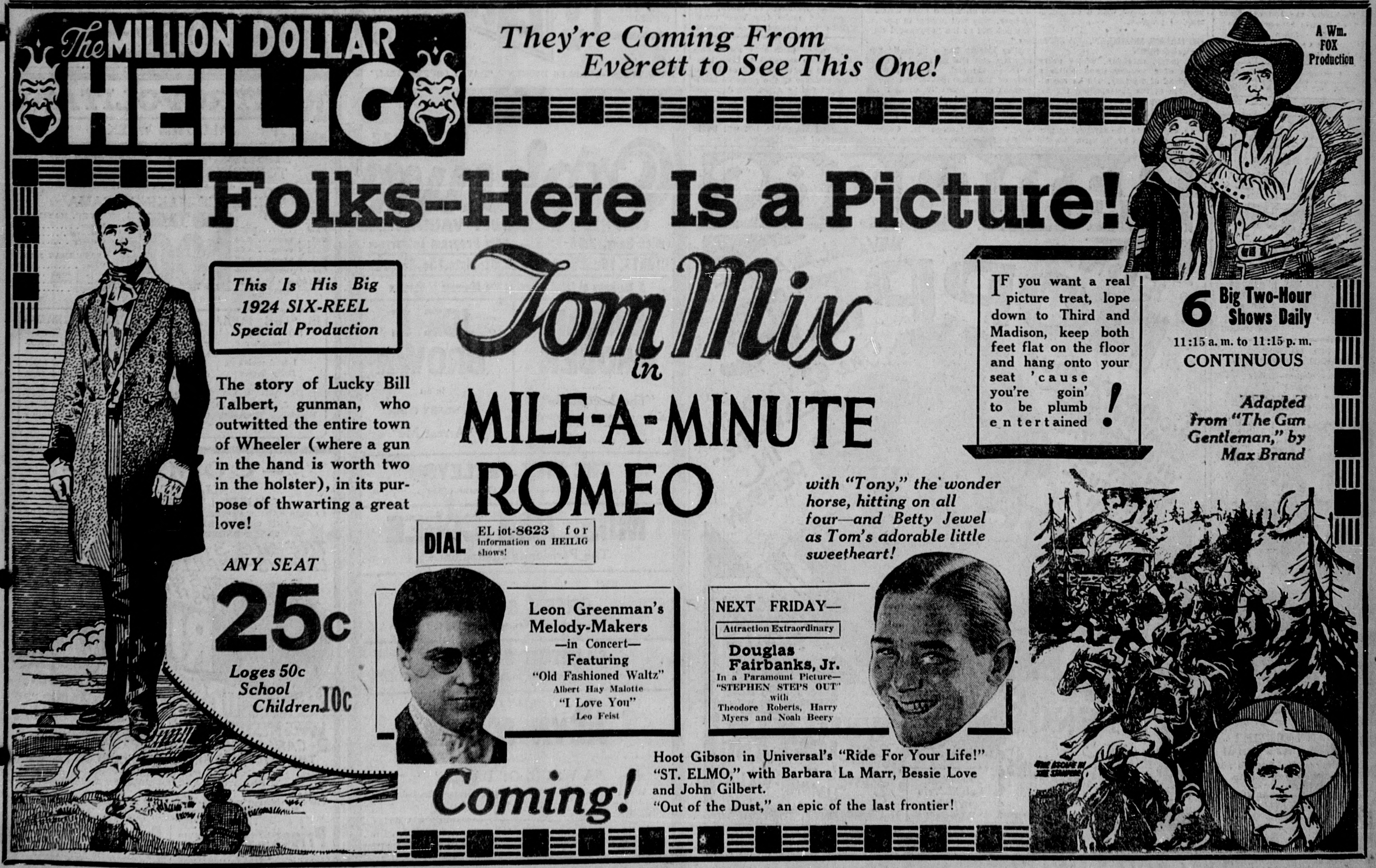
- Contemporary advertisement
- Directed by: Lambert Hillyer
- Screenplay by: Robert N. Lee
- Based on: Gun Gentlemen by Max Brand
- Starring: Tom Mix; Betty Jewel; J. Gordon Russell; James Mason; Duke R. Lee; James Quinn
- Production company: Fox Film Corporation
- Distributed by: Fox Film Corporation
- Release date: November 18, 1923
- Running time: 60 minutes
- Country: United States
- Languages: Silent; English intertitles

Mile-a-Minute Romeo is a 1923 American silent Western film directed by Lambert Hillyer and written by Robert N. Lee. It is based on the 1922 novel Gun Gentlemen by Max Brand. The film stars Tom Mix, Betty Jewel, J. Gordon Russell, James Mason, Duke R. Lee and James Quinn. The film was released on November 18, 1923, by Fox Film Corporation.

== Cast ==
- Tom Mix as Lucky Bill
- Betty Jewel as Molly
- J. Gordon Russell as Landry
- James Mason as Morgan
- Duke R. Lee as Sheriff
- James Quinn as Coroner
- Charles K. French as Sheriff
- Tony the Horse as Tony the Horse

== Preservation ==
With no prints of Mile-a-Minute Romeo located in any film archives, it is considered a lost film.
