= Myron Coureval Fagan =

American dramatist

- Born: October 31, 1887; United States
- Died: May 12, 1972 (aged 84); United States
- Occupations: Writer, producer, director

Myron Coureval Fagan (October 31, 1887 – May 12, 1972) was an American writer, producer and director for film and theatre and a Red Scare figure in the late 1940s and 1950s.

== Career ==
Fagan arrived on Broadway in 1907, where he quickly became one of the younger playwrights in American theater. Over the years, he worked in the theater with Alla Nazimova, Douglas Fairbanks, and John Barrymore. He also directed plays for the producers such as Charles Frohman, David Belasco. Fagan also became the dramatic editor of the Associated Newspapers. Many of the actors, including Humphrey Bogart, Brian Donlevy and Robert Ryan, whom Fagan directed or who appeared in his plays or screen adaptions, later became stars in Hollywood.

In 1916, Fagan took a break from the theater to serve as director of public relations for Republican presidential candidate Charles Evans Hughes. When a similar offer was made in 1928 to him by Herbert Hoover, he turned it down.

In 1929, the sound movie of his play The Great Power earned the dubious record of being the shortest run of any movie at the Capitol Theatre, New York. It was replaced with a silent comedy film after only one performance.

He moved to Hollywood in 1930, where he served as a writer and director with Pathe Pictures, Inc., then owned by Joseph P. Kennedy, at 20th Century Fox, and other Hollywood film studios.

== Anti-communism ==
In 1945, Fagan claimed he saw secret documents of the meetings in Yalta, shown to him by author John T. Flynn, that led him to write the plays Red Rainbow and Thieves Paradise. Written in 1945, Red Rainbow portrays Franklin Roosevelt, Joseph Stalin and others in Yalta plotting to deliver the Balkans, Eastern Europe and Berlin to Stalin. Left-wing groups in New York opposed the production of the play, and Fagan had difficulties getting financial backing to produce it. Fagan took the play to Hollywood where he encountered more protests against it than he had in New York.

In the late 1940s, Fagan launched a one-man crusade against what he claimed was a "Red Conspiracy in Hollywood". Out of this crusade came the Cinema Educational Guild.

In 1953, Red Rainbow was produced by Bruce Fagan and staged for 16 performances at the Royal Theatre between September 14 and 26.

Written two years later, Thieves Paradise portrays the same group plotting to create the United Nations as a Communist front for one world government.

Despite opposition, Thieves Paradise opened at the Las Palmas Theatre in Hollywood on December 26, 1947. It starred Howard Johnson, who was subject to a campaign of harassment so bitter and intense that it sent him to St. Vincent's Hospital with a nervous breakdown after six performances, and he never made another movie in Hollywood.Thieves Paradise was produced and staged at the El Patio theatre in Hollywood in April 1948. It opened on April 12, and despite protest against it, was able to complete its run.

=== Pamphleteer ===
From this period onward, Fagan did not produce any more work for stage or screen; instead he wrote anti-communist pamphlets, such as "Hollywood Reds Are on the Run", and bulletins for the remainder of his life.

The Eleventh Report of the Senate Fact-Finding Subcommittee on Un-American Activities of the California Legislature stated this of Fagan's anti-Communist lists,

But those who realized their mistake and left the front organizations in disgust and disillusionment are often still carried as subversives on the Fagan lists, and therein lies the danger from any unofficial organization that undertakes to publish lists of alleged subversive organizations and individuals. They do not have the facilities, nor the authority, nor the experience to handle these matters in an expert fashion and therefore they produce an enormous amount of harm by falsely accusing individuals who are not only loyal but who have profited greatly by their unfortunate experiences in having been lured into Communist-front groups.

=== Recordings ===
Between 1967 and 1968, Fagan recorded a set of three spoken-word LP records titled The Illuminati and the Council on Foreign Relations. Produced by Anthony Hilder, the records presented the Bavarian Illuminati, the Protocols of Zion, and internationalist politics as faces of a single grand "Luciferian" conspiracy directed by the Rothschild family. In 1968, he recorded another three LP spoken voice recordings, also produced by Anthony Hilder, titled Red Stars Over Hollywood. This recording has been transcribed and the text has been used to create a paper edition, published by Amazon Digital Services

== Death ==
Myron C. Fagan died on May 12, 1972, in Los Angeles, California.

== Credits ==
=== Plays ===
| 1923 | Thumbs Down |
| 1924 | Two Strangers from Nowhere |
| 1925 | Mismates |
| 1926 | The Little Spitfire |
| 1927 | Jimmie's Women |
| 1928 | A Great Power |
| 1929 | Indiscretion |
| 1930 | Nancy's Private Affair |
| 1930 | Peter Flies High |
| 1953 | A Red Rainbow |

Source: Internet Broadway Database

=== Motion pictures ===
| 1926: | Mismates (writer) |
| 1929: | The Great Power (writer, editor and cinematographer) |
| 1931: | Smart Woman (writer, adapted from his play Nancy's Private Affair) |
| 1931: | A Holy Terror (writer) |

Source: Internet Movie Database

=== Books and articles ===
| 1932 | Nancy's Private Affair, a comedy in three acts |
| 1932 | Peter Flies High, a comedy in three acts |
| 1934 | The Little Spitfire, a comedy-drama in three acts |
| 1948 | "Red Stars in Hollywood: Their Helpers, Fellow Travelers, and Co-Conspirators" |
| 1948 | Moscow over Hollywood (published by R.C. Cary, Los Angeles) |
| 1949 | "Moscow Marches on in Hollywood" (News-Bulletin/Cinema Educational Guild) |
| 1950 | "Reds in the Anti-Defamation League" (Cinema Educational Guild, News-Bulletin, May 1950) |
| 1950 | "Reds in 'Crusade for Freedom!'" (News-Bulletin) |
| 1950 | "Hollywood Reds Are on the Run!" |
| 1950 | "Documentation of the Red Stars in Hollywood" |
| 1950 | "Reds in the Anti-Defamation League" |
| 1951 | "What Is This Thing Called Anti-Semitism?" (News-Bulletin / Cinema Educational Guild) |
| 1951 | "Saga of Operation Survival" (News-Bulletin / Cinema Educational Guild) |
| 1953 | "Hollywood Backs U.N. Conspiracy" |
| 1954 | "Red Treason on Broadway" (Cinema Educational Guild) |
| 1954 | "How You Can Abolish United Nations" (No. 34) (Cinema Educational Guild) |
| 1956 | "United Nations 'on Trial' in Washington, D.C." (News-Bulletin) |
| 1962 | "Must We Have a Cuban Pearl Harbor?" (News-bulletin / Cinema Educational Guild) |
| 1964 | "How Hollywood Is Brainwashing the People" (News-bulletin / Cinema Educational Guild) |
| 1964 | "Civil Rights, Most Sinister Tool of the Great Conspiracy" (News-Bulletin) |
| 1965 | "How Greatest White Nations Were Mongrelized, Then Negroized: That Is the Fate Planned for the American People" (News-Bulletin) |
| 1966 | "The UN Already Secret Government of U.S.!: Our Recall Project Can Smash It!" (News-Bulletin) |
| 1966 | "The Complete Truth about the 'United Nations' conspiracy!" (News-Bulletin) |
| 1967 | "You Must Decide Fate of Our Nation!!!: The Negro (CFR) Plot Is Our Greatest Menace!" (News-Bulletin) |
| 1969 | "Proofs of the great conspiracy and how to smash it!!!" (News-bulletin / Cinema Educational Guild) |
