= Howard Higgin =

American filmmaker

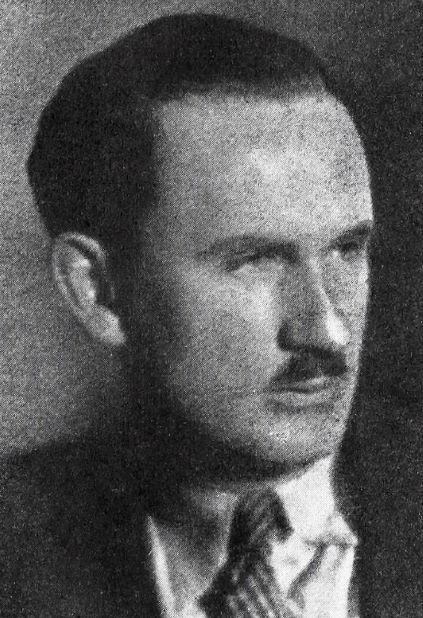
From a 1925 magazine

Howard Higgin (February 15, 1891 – December 16, 1938) was an American writer and director of motion pictures in the 1920s and 1930s.

== Biography ==
After graduating from the Pratt Institute, Higgin began working at the architectural firm McKim, Mead & White, but his interest in the theater resulted in his designing stages for John Cort and then at the First National Pictures film studio as a property boy. Higgin was production manager on Cecil De Mille's Forbidden Fruit (1921). Higgin's first directing job was a 1922 comedy for legendary Wallace Reid, Rent Free. His later films include High Voltage and Skyscraper, and he worked with Wallace Beery, Clark Gable (as writer/director of Gable's screen breakthrough role as the unshaven villain in The Painted Desert), Carole Lombard, Bette Davis (in Hell's House), Pat O'Brien, Alan Hale, Sr., Blanche Sweet, Basil Rathbone, Robert Armstrong and Mae Clarke, among many others.

Higgins' movie career spanned 18 years, having begun working on film crews in 1919. He died in Los Angeles at age 47.

== Partial filmography ==
- Rent Free (1922)
- Fashion Row (1923) (screenplay)
- Don't Doubt Your Husband (1924) (screenplay)
- Changing Husbands (1924) (screenplay)
- Broken Barriers (1924) (scenario)
- The Trouble with Wives (1925) (screenplay)
- The New Commandment (1925) (screenplay and direction)
- In the Name of Love (1925) (screenplay and direction)
- The Reckless Lady (1926) (direction)
- The Wilderness Woman (1926)
- The Great Deception (1926)
- The Perfect Sap (1927)
- Skyscraper (1928)
- Sal of Singapore (1928)
- Power (1928)
- The Leatherneck (1929)
- High Voltage (1929)
- The Racketeer (1929)
- Her Man (1930) (screenplay)
- The Painted Desert (1931) (screenplay and direction)
- Hell's House (1932)
- The Last Man (1932)
- The Final Edition (1932)
- Carnival Lady (1933)
- Marriage on Approval (1933) (screenplay and direction)
- The Line-Up (1934)
- I Conquer the Sea! (1936) (screenplay)
- The Invisible Ray (1936) (screenplay)
- Revolt of the Zombies (1936) (screenplay)
- Raw Timber (1937)
- Cafe Hostess (1940) (screenplay)
