= Arizona Bound (1927 film) =

1927 film

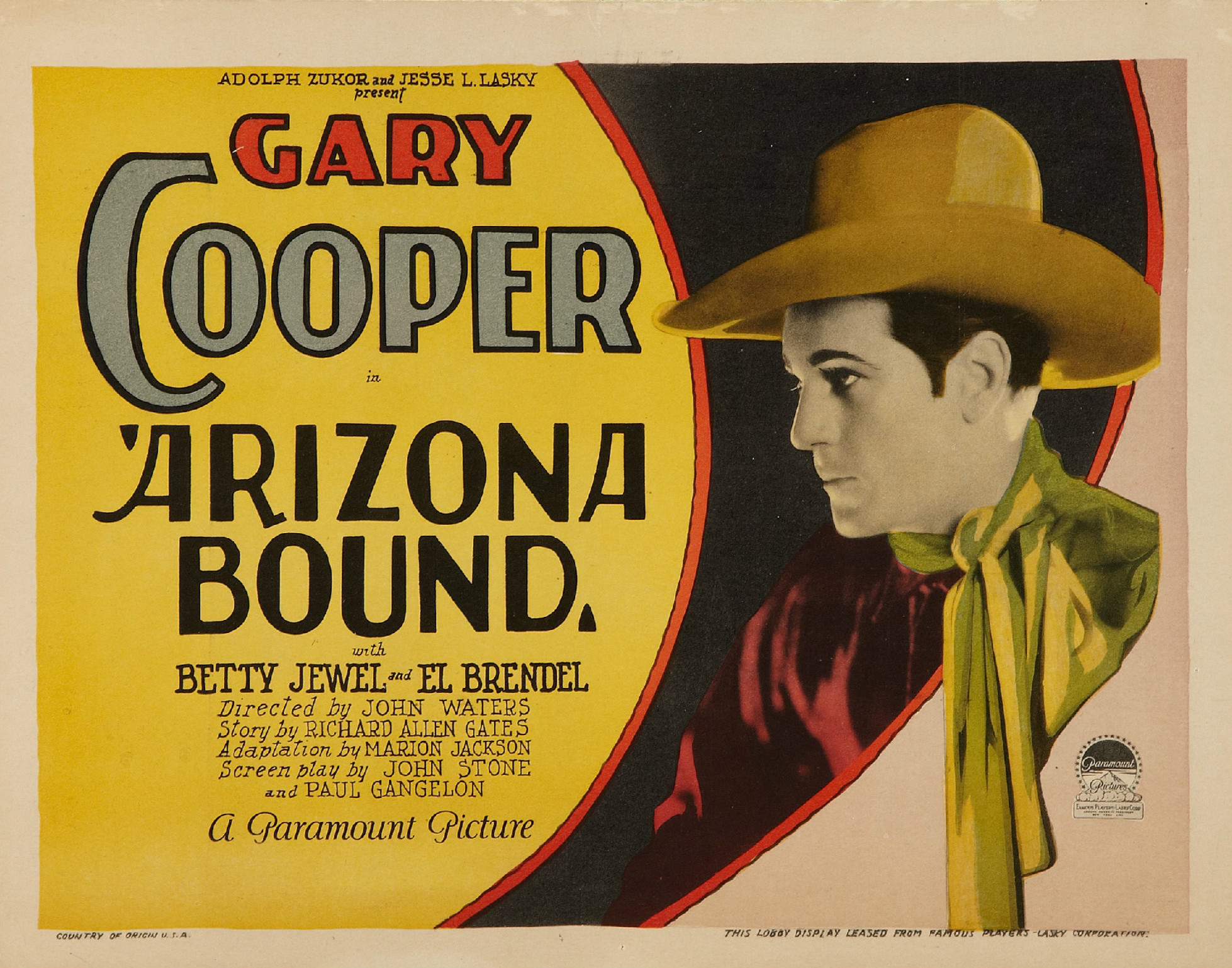
- Lobby card
- Directed by: John Waters
- Written by: Alfred Hustwick (titles); Marion Jackson; John Stone
- Story by: Richard Allen Gates
- Produced by: E. Lloyd Sheldon
- Starring: Gary Cooper; Betty Jewel; El Brendel
- Cinematography: Charles Edgar Schoenbaum
- Production company: Famous Players–Lasky
- Distributed by: Paramount Pictures
- Release date: April 9, 1927 (USA)
- Running time: 53 minutes 5 reels, 4,912 ft
- Country: United States
- Languages: Silent; English intertitles

Arizona Bound is a lost 1927 American silent Western film directed by John Waters and starring Gary Cooper, Betty Jewel, and El Brendel.

Written by Richard Allen Gates, Alfred Hustwick, Marion Jackson, and John Stone, the film is about an Arizona cowboy who spends most of his time caring for his white horse and pursuing a local girl, who is unimpressed with his irresponsible ways.

After he takes a job as a stagecoach guard to protect a shipment of gold, he is attacked by a Texas gang. After being accused of being one of the bandits, he narrowly escapes lynching, retrieves the gold, and establishes his innocence and wins the trust of the local girl. Arizona Bound was filmed on location in Bryce Canyon National Park in Utah.

Produced by E. Lloyd Sheldon for Famous Players–Lasky Corporation, the film was released on April 9, 1927, in the United States.

== Plot ==
In the small mining town of Mesquite, cowboy Dave Saulter, spends most of his time caring for his prized white horse, Flash, and romantically pursuing a local girl named Ann Winslow. Unimpressed with Dave's irresponsible behavior, Ann attends a dance with another cowboy, Buck Hanna. At the dance, Dave manages to intercept Buck just as he is about to have the first dance with Ann. Later, a resentful Buck plots to steal a gold shipment entrusted to his protection. Meanwhile, Dave ties up the man assigned to guard the shipment and takes his place.

As the coach makes its way along a desert road, a bandit named Texas Jack and his gang waylay the shipment and knock Dave unconscious. After Buck and his men accuse Dave of being involved in the heist, the Swede Oley Smoke Oleson accidentally locates the stolen gold. When Ann discovers that Buck is guilty of the heist, she confronts him, and he kidnaps her in a coach, with Dave in hot pursuit. When he catches up to the fleeing bandit, he overpowers Buck and wins the heart of Ann.

== Cast ==
- Gary Cooper as Dave Saulter
- Betty Jewel as Ann Winslow
- El Brendel as Oley Smoke Oleson
- Jack Dougherty as Buck Hanna
- Christian J. Frank as Texas Jack
- Charles Crockett as John Winslow
- Joe Butterworth as Tommy Winslow
- Guy Oliver as Sheriff
- Guinn "Big Boy" Williams in a bit part

== Production ==
Arizona Bound was filmed on location in Bryce Canyon National Park in Utah, as well as the Apache Trail and Papago Park in Arizona.
