= List of American films of 1922 =

American films released in 1922

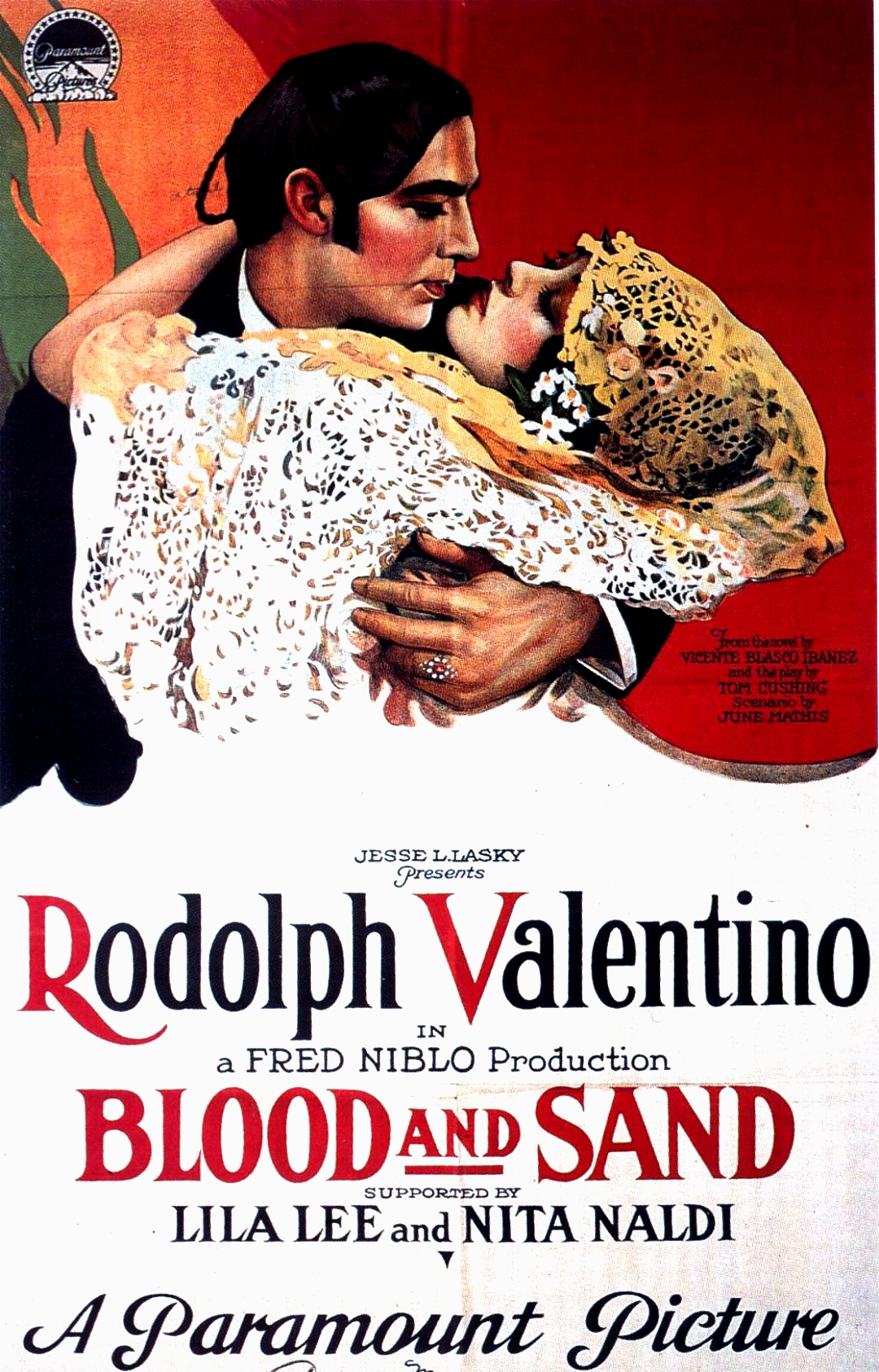
Blood and Sand starring Rudolph Valentino.

More than 815 feature films were released from America in 1922.

== A ==
Title	Director	Cast	Genre	Note
According to Hoyle	W. S. Van Dyke	David Butler, Helen Ferguson	Western	Independent
Across the Continent	Phil Rosen	Wallace Reid, Mary MacLaren	Sports	Paramount
Across the Deadline	Jack Conway	Frank Mayo, Russell Simpson	Drama	Universal
Affinities	Ward Lascelle	John Bowers, Colleen Moore	Comedy	Hodkinson
Afraid to Fight	William Worthington	Frank Mayo, Lillian Rich	Drama	Universal
Alias Julius Caesar	Charles Ray	Charles Ray, Barbara Bedford	Comedy	First National
The Altar Stairs	Lambert Hillyer	Frank Mayo, Louise Lorraine	Drama	Universal
Always the Woman	Arthur Rosson	Betty Compson, Emory Johnson	Romance	Goldwyn
The Angel of Crooked Street	David Smith	Alice Calhoun, William McCall	Crime	Vitagraph
Anna Ascends	Victor Fleming	Alice Brady, Robert Ellis	Romance	Paramount
Another Man's Boots	William James Craft	Francis Ford, Bob Kortman, Frank Lanning	Western	Independent
Another Man's Shoes	Jack Conway	Herbert Rawlinson, Barbara Bedford	Comedy	Universal
Any Night	Martin Beck	Tully Marshall, Robert Edeson, Lila Leslie	Crime	Independent
Any Wife	Herbert Brenon	Pearl White, Holmes Herbert	Drama	Fox Film
Apartment Wanted	Alfred J. Goulding	Lee Moran, Alberta Vaughn	Comedy	Universal
Arabian Love	Jerome Storm	John Gilbert, Barbara Bedford, Barbara La Marr	Drama	Fox Film
At the Sign of the Jack O'Lantern	Lloyd Ingraham	Betty Ross Clarke, Earl Schenck, Wade Boteler	Comedy	Hodkinson

== B ==
Title	Director	Cast	Genre	Note
The Bachelor Daddy	Alfred E. Green	Thomas Meighan, Leatrice Joy	Comedy	Paramount
Back Home and Broke	Alfred E. Green	Thomas Meighan, Lila Lee	Comedy	Paramount
Back Pay	Frank Borzage	Seena Owen, Matt Moore	Drama	Paramount
Back to Yellow Jacket	Ben F. Wilson	Roy Stewart, Kathleen Kirkham, Earl Metcalfe	Western	Arrow
Barb Wire	Francis J. Grandon	Jack Hoxie, Joseph McDermott	Western	Independent
The Barnstormer	Charles Ray	Wilfred Lucas, Florence Oberle	Comedy	First National
Barriers of Folly	Edward A. Kull	George Larkin, Eva Novak, Wilfred Lucas	Western	Independent
The Bearcat	Edward Sedgwick	Hoot Gibson, Lillian Rich	Western	Universal
The Beautiful and Damned	William A. Seiter	Marie Prevost, Kenneth Harlan	Drama	Warner Bros.
The Beauty Shop	Edward Dillon	Raymond Hitchcock, Louise Fazenda	Comedy	Paramount
Beauty's Worth	Robert G. Vignola	Marion Davies, Forrest Stanley	Comedy	Paramount
Belle of Alaska	Chester Bennett	J. Frank Glendon, Jane Novak, Noah Beery	Drama	Independent
Bells of San Juan	Scott R. Dunlap	Buck Jones, Fritzi Brunette	Western	Fox Film
Beyond the Rainbow	Christy Cabanne	Harry T. Morey, Billie Dove, Clara Bow	Drama	FBO
Beyond the Rocks	Sam Wood	Gloria Swanson, Rudolph Valentino	Drama	Paramount
Billy Jim	Frank Borzage	Fred Stone, Billy Bletcher	Comedy western	FBO
The Black Bag	Stuart Paton	Herbert Rawlinson, Virginia Valli	Mystery	Universal
Blaze Away	William Hughes Curran	Guinn 'Big Boy' Williams, Molly Malone, Hal Wilson	Western	Independent
Blazing Arrows	Henry McCarty	Lester Cuneo, Francelia Billington, Clark Comstock	Western	Independent
A Blind Bargain	Wallace Worsley	Lon Chaney, Raymond McKee	Horror	Goldwyn
The Blonde Vampire	Wray Physioc	De Sacia Mooers, Joseph W. Smiley, Miriam Battista	Drama	FBO
Blood and Sand	Fred Niblo	Rudolph Valentino, Nita Naldi, Lila Lee	Drama	Paramount
Bobbed Hair	Thomas N. Heffron	Wanda Hawley, William Boyd	Romance	Paramount
The Bond Boy	Henry King	Richard Barthelmess, Charles Hill Mailes	Drama	First National
The Bonded Woman	Phil Rosen	Betty Compson, John Bowers	Drama	Paramount
Boomerang Bill	Tom Terriss	Lionel Barrymore, Marguerite Marsh	Crime	Paramount
Boomerang Justice	Edward Sedgwick	George Larkin, Fritzi Ridgeway, Al Ferguson	Western	Independent
The Bootleggers	Roy Sheldon	Walter Miller, Paul Panzer	Drama	FBO
The Bootlegger's Daughter	Victor Schertzinger	Enid Bennett, Fred Niblo	Drama	Independent
Borderland	Paul Powell	Agnes Ayres, Milton Sills	Drama	Paramount
The Boss of Camp Four	W. S. Van Dyke	Buck Jones, Fritzi Brunette	Western	Fox Film
Bought and Paid For	William C. deMille	Agnes Ayres, Jack Holt	Drama	Paramount
Boy Crazy	William A. Seiter	Doris May, Fred Gamble	Romantic comedy	FBO
Brawn of the North	Laurence Trimble	Irene Rich, Lee Shumway	Adventure	First National
Breaking Home Ties	George K. Rolands	Lee Kohlmar, Rebecca Weintraub, Jane Thomas	Drama	Associated Exhibitors
The Bride's Play	George Terwilliger	Marion Davies, John B. O'Brien	Romance	Paramount
Broad Daylight	Irving Cummings	Lois Wilson, Jack Mulhall	Crime	Universal
The Broadway Madonna	Harry Revier	Dorothy Revier, Harry von Meter	Drama	FBO
The Broadway Peacock	Charles Brabin	Pearl White, Joseph Striker	Drama	Fox Film
Broadway Rose	Robert Z. Leonard	Mae Murray, Monte Blue	Drama	Metro
Broken Chains	Allen Holubar	Colleen Moore, Malcolm McGregor, Ernest Torrence	Drama	Goldwyn
The Broken Silence	Dell Henderson	Zena Keefe, Robert Elliott, J. Barney Sherry	Western	Independent
Brothers Under the Skin	E. Mason Hopper	Pat O'Malley, Helene Chadwick, Mae Busch	Comedy	Goldwyn
Bulldog Courage	Edward A. Kull	George Larkin, Bessie Love	Western	Russell Productions / State Rights
Burning Sands	George Melford	Wanda Hawley, Milton Sills, Jacqueline Logan	Drama	Paramount

== C ==
Title	Director	Cast	Genre	Note
A California Romance	Jerome Storm	John Gilbert, Estelle Taylor	Historical	Fox Film
The Call of Home	Louis J. Gasnier	Léon Bary, Irene Rich	Drama	FBO
Calvert's Valley	John Francis Dillon	John Gilbert, Sylvia Breamer	Drama	Fox Film
Captain Fly-by-Night	William K. Howard	Johnnie Walker, Francis McDonald	Adventure	FBO
Catch My Smoke	William Beaudine	Tom Mix, Lillian Rich, Claude Payton	Western	Fox Film
Caught Bluffing	Lambert Hillyer	Frank Mayo, Edna Murphy	Western	Universal
The Challenge	Tom Terriss	Rod La Rocque, Dolores Cassinelli, Warner Richmond	Drama	Independent
Channing of the Northwest	Ralph Ince	Eugene O'Brien, Norma Shearer	Drama	Selznick
Chasing the Moon	Edward Sedgwick	Tom Mix, Eva Novak	Drama	Fox Film
Clarence	William C. deMille	Wallace Reid, Agnes Ayres	Comedy drama	Paramount
Colleen of the Pines	Chester Bennett	Jane Novak, Edward Hearn	Drama	FBO
Come on Over	Alfred E. Green	Colleen Moore, Ralph Graves	Comedy	Goldwyn
Confidence	Harry A. Pollard	Herbert Rawlinson, Harriet Hammond	Comedy	Universal
Conquering the Woman	King Vidor	Florence Vidor, Mathilde Brundage	Drama	Independent
The Country Flapper	F. Richard Jones	Dorothy Gish, Glenn Hunter	Comedy	Independent
The Cowboy and the Lady	Charles Maigne	Mary Miles Minter, Tom Moore	Western	Paramount
The Cowboy King	Charles R. Seeling	Guinn 'Big Boy' Williams, Patricia Palmer	Western	Independent
The Cradle	Paul Powell	Ethel Clayton, Charles Meredith	Drama	Paramount
The Cradle Buster	Frank Tuttle	Glenn Hunter, Marguerite Courtot, Osgood Perkins	Comedy	Independent
The Crimson Challenge	Paul Powell	Dorothy Dalton, Jack Mower	Western	Paramount
The Crossroads of New York	F. Richard Jones	Noah Beery, Ethel Grey Terry	Comedy	First National
The Crow's Nest	Paul Hurst	Jack Hoxie, Evelyn Nelson	Western	Independent
The Crusader	Howard M. Mitchell	William Russell, Gertrude Claire, Helen Ferguson	Western	Fox Film
The Cub Reporter	John Francis Dillon	Richard Talmadge, Jean Calhoun, Edwin B. Tilton	Action	Independent
The Curse of Drink	Harry O. Hoyt	Harry T. Morey, Edmund Breese, Marguerite Clayton	Drama	Independent

== D ==
Title	Director	Cast	Genre	Note
The Danger Point	Lloyd Ingraham	Carmel Myers, William P. Carleton, Vernon Steele	Drama	Independent
A Dangerous Game	King Baggot	Gladys Walton, Spottiswoode Aitken	Drama	Universal
The Dangerous Little Demon	Clarence G. Badger	Marie Prevost, Jack Perrin	Comedy	Universal
Dangerous Pastime	James W. Horne	Lew Cody, Cleo Ridgely, Elinor Fair	Drama	Independent
Daring Danger	Clifford Smith	Pete Morrison, Esther Ralston, Lew Meehan	Western	Independent
The Darling of the Rich	John G. Adolfi	Betty Blythe, Montagu Love, Charles K. Gerrard	Drama	Independent
A Daughter of Luxury	Paul Powell	Agnes Ayres, Tom Gallery, Edith Yorke	Comedy	Paramount
Deserted at the Altar	William K. Howard	Bessie Love, Tully Marshall	Drama	Independent
Destiny's Isle	William P.S. Earle	Virginia Lee, Ward Crane, Florence Billings	Drama	Independent
Determination	Joseph Levering	Maurice Costello, Corene Uzzell	Drama	Independent
The Dictator	James Cruze	Wallace Reid, Theodore Kosloff, Lila Lee	Adventure	Paramount
Divorce Coupons	Webster Campbell	Corinne Griffith, Holmes Herbert	Drama	Vitagraph
Do and Dare	Edward Sedgwick	Tom Mix, Claire Adams	Western	Fox Film
A Doll's House	Charles Bryant	Alan Hale Sr., Alla Nazimova	Drama	United Artists
Domestic Relations	Chester Withey	Katherine MacDonald, William P. Carleton	Drama	First National
Don't Get Personal	Clarence G. Badger	Marie Prevost, George Nichols	Romantic comedy	Universal
Don't Shoot	Jack Conway	Herbert Rawlinson, Edna Murphy	Crime	Universal
Don't Write Letters	George D. Baker	Gareth Hughes, Bartine Burkett	Comedy	Metro
Down to the Sea in Ships	Elmer Clifton	Marguerite Courtot, Raymond McKee, Clara Bow	Drama	Independent
Dr. Jack	Fred C. Newmeyer	Harold Lloyd, Mildred Davis	Comedy	Pathé Distributors
The Deuce of Spades	Charles Ray	Charles Ray, Lincoln Plumer	Comedy	First National
Dusk to Dawn	King Vidor	Florence Vidor, Jack Mulhall	Drama	Independent
The Dust Flower	Rowland V. Lee	Helene Chadwick, James Rennie	Drama	Goldwyn

== E ==
Title	Director	Cast	Genre	Note
East Is West	Sidney Franklin	Constance Talmadge, Edmund Burns	Drama	First National
Ebb Tide	George Melford	Lila Lee, Raymond Hatton	Adventure	Paramount
Elope If You Must	C.R. Wallace	Eileen Percy, A. Edward Sutherland	Comedy	Fox Film
Enter Madame	Wallace Worsley	Clara Kimball Young, Louise Dresser	Romantic comedy	Metro
Environment	Irving Cummings	Milton Sills, Alice Lake, Gertrude Claire	Crime	Independent
The Eternal Flame	Frank Lloyd	Norma Talmadge, Adolphe Menjou, Conway Tearle	Adventure	First National
Evidence	George Archainbaud	Elaine Hammerstein, Niles Welch	Drama	Selznick
Extra! Extra!	William K. Howard	Edna Murphy, Johnnie Walker	Adventure	Fox Film

== F ==
Title	Director	Cast	Genre	Note
The Face Between	Bayard Veiller	Bert Lytell, Sylvia Breamer	Drama	Metro
The Face in the Fog	Alan Crosland	Lionel Barrymore, Seena Owen	Mystery	Paramount
Face to Face	Harry Grossman	Marguerite Marsh, Coit Albertson	Mystery	Independent
Fair Lady	Kenneth Webb	Betty Blythe, Thurston Hall	Drama	United Artists
False Fronts	Samuel R. Brodsky	Edward Earle, Madelyn Clare, Frank Losee	Drama	Independent
Fascination	Robert Z. Leonard	Mae Murray, Creighton Hale	Drama	Tiffany
The Fast Freight	James Cruze	Roscoe Arbuckle, Lila Lee	Comedy	Paramount
The Fast Mail	Bernard J. Durning	Buck Jones, Eileen Percy	Action	Fox Film
The Fighting Guide	William Duncan	William Duncan, Edith Johnson	Action	Vitagraph
The Fighting Streak	Arthur Rosson	Tom Mix, Patsy Ruth Miller	Western	Fox Film
Find the Woman	Tom Terriss	Alma Rubens, Harrison Ford	Mystery	Paramount
The Fire Bride	Arthur Rosson	Ruth Renick, Edward Hearn	Adventure	FBO
The First Woman	Glen Lyons	Mildred Harris, Percy Marmont	Drama	FBO
Five Days to Live	Norman Dawn	Sessue Hayakawa, Tsuru Aoki	Drama	FBO
The Five Dollar Baby	Harry Beaumont	Viola Dana, Ralph Lewis	Comedy	Metro
The Flaming Hour	Edward Sedgwick	Frank Mayo, Helen Ferguson	Drama	Universal
Flesh and Blood	Irving Cummings	Lon Chaney, Edith Roberts	Drama	Independent
Flesh and Spirit	Joseph Levering	Belle Bennett, Denton Vane	Drama	Independent
The Flirt	Hobart Henley	George Nichols, Eileen Percy	Comedy	Universal
A Fool There Was	Emmett J. Flynn	Estelle Taylor, Lewis Stone, Irene Rich	Drama	Fox Film
Foolish Wives	Erich von Stroheim	Erich von Stroheim, Mae Busch	Drama	Universal. Most expensive film made to this year.
Fools First	Marshall Neilan	Richard Dix, Claire Windsor	Drama	First National
Fools of Fortune	Louis Chaudet	Russell Simpson, Marguerite De La Motte, Tully Marshall	Comedy	Independent
For Big Stakes	Lynn Reynolds	Tom Mix, Patsy Ruth Miller	Western	Fox Film
For the Defense	Paul Powell	Ethel Clayton, Vernon Steele	Mystery	Paramount
Forget Me Not	W. S. Van Dyke	Irene Hunt, Bessie Love, Gareth Hughes	Drama	Metro
The Forgotten Law	James W. Horne	Milton Sills, Jack Mulhall	Drama	Metro
Forsaking All Others	Emile Chautard	Colleen Moore, Cullen Landis	Drama	Universal
Fortune's Mask	Robert Ensminger	Earle Williams, Patsy Ruth Miller	Drama	Vitagraph
The Fourteenth Lover	Harry Beaumont	Viola Dana, Jack Mulhall, Theodore von Eltz	Comedy	Metro
Free Air	Edward H. Griffith	Henry G. Sell, Dorothy Allen	Comedy	Hodkinson
French Heels	Edwin L. Hollywood	Irene Castle, Ward Crane, Charles K. Gerrard	Romantic comedy	Independent
The Freshie	William Hughes Curran	Guinn 'Big Boy' Williams, Molly Malone, Lincoln Stedman	Western	Independent
A Front Page Story	Jess Robbins	Edward Everett Horton, Lloyd Ingraham, Edith Roberts	Comedy	Vitagraph

== G ==
Title	Director	Cast	Genre	Note
The Galloping Kid	Nat Ross	Hoot Gibson, Edna Murphy	Western	Universal
A Game Chicken	Chester Franklin	Bebe Daniels, Pat O'Malley	Romantic comedy	Paramount
Gas, Oil and Water	Charles Ray	Charles Ray, Otto Hoffman	Comedy	First National
Gay and Devilish	William A. Seiter	Doris May, Cullen Landis	Romantic comedy	FBO
The Ghost Breaker	Alfred E. Green	Wallace Reid, Lila Lee	Comedy	Paramount
The Girl from Rocky Point	Fred Becker	Milton Ross, Ora Carew, Gloria Joy	Drama	Independent
The Girl in His Room	Edward José	Alice Calhoun, Warner Baxter	Drama	Vitagraph
The Girl Who Ran Wild	Rupert Julian	Gladys Walton, Vernon Steele	Action	Universal
A Girl's Desire	David Smith	Alice Calhoun, Warner Baxter	Comedy	Vitagraph
Glass Houses	Harry Beaumont	Viola Dana, Gaston Glass	Romance	Metro
Gleam o'Dawn	John Francis Dillon	John Gilbert, Barbara Bedford	Drama	Fox Film
The Glorious Fool	E. Mason Hopper	Helene Chadwick, Richard Dix	Comedy drama	Goldwyn
The Glory of Clementina	Emile Chautard	Pauline Frederick, Edward Martindel	Drama	FBO
Golden Dreams	Benjamin B. Hampton	Rose Dione, Claire Adams	Adventure	Goldwyn
The Golden Gallows	Paul Scardon	Miss DuPont, Edwin Stevens, Eve Southern	Drama	Universal
The Golden Gift	Maxwell Karger	Alice Lake, John Bowers	Drama	Metro
Good Men and True	Val Paul	Harry Carey, Vola Vale	Western	FBO
The Good Provider	Frank Borzage	Vera Gordon, Miriam Battista	Drama	Paramount
Grand Larceny	Wallace Worsley	Elliott Dexter, Claire Windsor	Romance	Goldwyn
Grandma's Boy	Fred C. Newmeyer	Harold Lloyd, Mildred Davis	Comedy	Independent
The Gray Dawn	Jean Hersholt, Benjamin B. Hampton	Claire Adams, Robert McKim, George Hackathorne	Drama	Hodkinson
The Great Alone	Jacques Jaccard	Monroe Salisbury, Walter Law, George Waggner	Drama	Independent
The Great Night	Howard M. Mitchell	William Russell, Eva Novak	Comedy	Fox Film
The Green Temptation	William Desmond Taylor	Betty Compson, Theodore Kosloff	Drama	Paramount
The Guttersnipe	Dallas M. Fitzgerald	Gladys Walton, Jack Perrin	Romance	Universal

== H ==
Title	Director	Cast	Genre	Note
The Half Breed	Charles A. Taylor	Wheeler Oakman, Ann May	Western	First National
The Hands of Nara	Harry Garson	Clara Kimball Young, Elliott Dexter	Drama	Metro
Hate	Maxwell Karger	Alice Lake, Conrad Nagel	Crime	Metro
Head over Heels	Victor Schertzinger	Mabel Normand, Raymond Hatton, Adolphe Menjou	Comedy	Goldwyn
Headin' West	William James Craft	Hoot Gibson, Gertrude Short	Western	Universal
The Headless Horseman	Edward D. Venturini	Will Rogers, Lois Meredith	Comedy horror	Independent
Heart's Haven	Benjamin B. Hampton	Robert McKim, Claire Adams, Claire McDowell	Drama	Hodkinson
The Heart Specialist	Frank Urson	Mary Miles Minter, Allan Forrest	Drama	Paramount
Her Gilded Cage	Sam Wood	Gloria Swanson, David Powell	Drama	Paramount
Her Husband's Trademark	Sam Wood	Gloria Swanson, Stuart Holmes	Drama	Paramount
Her Majesty	George Irving	Mollie King, Creighton Hale	Comedy	Associated Exhibitors
Her Own Money	Joseph Henabery	Warner Baxter, Ethel Clayton	Comedy	Paramount
Heroes and Husbands	Chester Withey	Katherine MacDonald, Nigel Barrie, Charles K. Gerrard	Drama	First National
Heroes of the Street	William Beaudine	Wesley Barry, Marie Prevost, Jack Mulhall	Crime comedy	Warner Bros.
Hills of Missing Men	J.P. McGowan	J.P. McGowan, Florence Gilbert, Helen Holmes	Western	Associated Exhibitors
His Back Against the Wall	Rowland V. Lee	Raymond Hatton, Virginia Valli	Comedy	Goldwyn
His Wife's Husband	Kenneth S. Webb	Betty Blythe, Huntley Gordon	Drama	Independent
A Homespun Vamp	Frank O'Connor	May McAvoy, Lincoln Stedman	Drama	Paramount
Honor First	Jerome Storm	John Gilbert, Renée Adorée	Drama	Fox Film
The Hottentot	Del Andrews	Raymond Hatton, Madge Bellamy	Comedy	First National
How Women Love	Kenneth S. Webb	Betty Blythe, Gladys Hulette	Drama	Independent
Human Hearts	King Baggot	House Peters, George Hackathorne	Drama	Universal
Hungry Hearts	E. Mason Hopper	Helen Ferguson, Bryant Washburn	Drama	Goldwyn
Hurricane's Gal	Allen Holubar	Dorothy Phillips, Wallace Beery, Gertrude Astor	Adventure	First National

== I ==
Title	Director	Cast	Genre	Note
I Am the Law	Edwin Carewe	Alice Lake, Kenneth Harlan, Rosemary Theby	Drama	Independent
I Can Explain	George D. Baker	Bartine Burkett, Grace Darmond	Comedy	Metro
If I Were Queen	Wesley Ruggles	Ethel Clayton, Warner Baxter	Romance	FBO
If You Believe It, It's So	Tom Forman	Thomas Meighan, Pauline Starke	Drama	Paramount
The Impossible Mrs. Bellew	Sam Wood	Gloria Swanson, Conrad Nagel	Drama	Paramount
In the Name of the Law	Emory Johnson	Ralph Lewis, Claire McDowell	Crime drama	FBO
The Infidel	James Young	Katherine MacDonald, Robert Ellis	Drama	First National
The Inner Man	Hamilton Smith	Wyndham Standing, Dorothy Mackaill, Gustav von Seyffertitz	Comedy	Independent
Iron to Gold	Bernard J. Durning	Dustin Farnum, Marguerite Marsh	Western	Fox Film
Is Matrimony a Failure?	James Cruze	T. Roy Barnes, Lila Lee	Comedy	Paramount
Island Wives	Webster Campbell	Corinne Griffith, Charles Trowbridge	Drama	Vitagraph
Isle of Doubt	Hamilton Smith	Wyndham Standing, Dorothy Mackaill, Warner Richmond	Drama	Independent

== J ==
Title	Director	Cast	Genre	Note
Jan of the Big Snows	Charles M. Seay	Warner Richmond, Louise Prussing, Richard Neill	Drama	Independent
The Jilt	Irving Cummings	Marguerite De La Motte, Ralph Graves, Matt Moore	Drama	Universal
John Smith	Victor Heerman	Eugene O'Brien, Mary Astor, George Fawcett	Comedy	Selznick
June Madness	Harry Beaumont	Viola Dana, Bryant Washburn, Gerald Pring	Comedy	Metro
Just Tony	Lynn Reynolds	Tom Mix, Claire Adams	Western	Fox Film

== K ==
Title	Director	Cast	Genre	Note
The Kentucky Derby	King Baggot	Reginald Denny, Lillian Rich	Adventure	Universal
The Kickback	Val Paul	Harry Carey, Henry B. Walthall	Western	FBO
Kick In	George Fitzmaurice	Betty Compson, Gareth Hughes, May McAvoy	Crime	Paramount
Kindred of the Dust	Raoul Walsh	Miriam Cooper, Ralph Graves	Romance	First National
The Kingdom Within	Victor Schertzinger	Russell Simpson, Gaston Glass, Pauline Starke	Drama	Hodkinson
Kissed	King Baggot	Marie Prevost, Lloyd Whitlock	Romantic comedy	Universal
Kisses	Maxwell Karger	Alice Lake, Harry Myers	Romantic comedy	Metro

== L ==
Title	Director	Cast	Genre	Note
The Ladder Jinx	Jess Robbins	Edward Everett Horton, Margaret Landis	Comedy	Vitagraph
The Lane That Had No Turning	Victor Fleming	Agnes Ayres, Theodore Kosloff, Mahlon Hamilton	Drama	Paramount
The Lavender Bath Lady	King Baggot	Gladys Walton, Edmund Burns	Comedy	Universal
The Law and the Woman	Penrhyn Stanlaws	Betty Compson, William P. Carleton	Drama	Paramount
The Light in the Dark	Clarence Brown	Lon Chaney, Hope Hampton	Drama	First National
The Lights of New York	Charles Brabin	Estelle Taylor, Charles K. Gerrard	Drama	Fox Film
Lights of the Desert	Harry Beaumont	Shirley Mason, Allan Forrest	Western	Fox Film
Little Eva Ascends	George D. Baker	Gareth Hughes, May Collins	Comedy	Metro
The Little Minister	David Smith	Alice Calhoun, James Morrison	Drama	Vitagraph
Little Miss Smiles	John Ford	Shirley Mason, Gaston Glass	Drama	Fox Film
Little Wildcat	David Smith	Alice Calhoun, Oliver Hardy	Comedy	Vitagraph
The Loaded Door	Harry A. Pollard	Hoot Gibson, Gertrude Olmstead	Western	Universal
The Lone Hand	B. Reeves Eason	Hoot Gibson, Marjorie Daw	Western	Universal
Lonesome Corners	Edgar Jones	Edgar Jones, Lillian Lorraine	Western	Pathe Exchange
The Long Chance	Jack Conway	Henry B. Walthall, Marjorie Daw	Western	Universal
Lorna Doone	Maurice Tourneur	Madge Bellamy, John Bowers	Period drama	First National
The Love Gambler	Joseph Franz	John Gilbert, Carmel Myers	Western	Fox Film
Love in the Dark	Harry Beaumont	Viola Dana, Cullen Landis	Drama	Metro
Love Is an Awful Thing	Victor Heerman	Owen Moore, Marjorie Daw, Tom Guise	Comedy	Selznick
Love's Masquerade	William P. S. Earle	Conway Tearle, Winifred Westover	Drama	Selznick
Lucky Dan	William K. Howard	Richard Talmadge, George A. Williams, Dorothy Wood	Action	Independent
The Lying Truth	Marion Fairfax	Noah Beery, Marjorie Daw	Drama	Independent

== M ==
Title	Director	Cast	Genre	Note
The Madness of Love	Wray Physioc	Charles Craig, Bernard Siegel	Drama	Independent
Making a Man	Joseph Henabery	Jack Holt, Eva Novak	Drama	Paramount
The Man from Beyond	Burton L. King	Harry Houdini, Arthur Maude	Mystery	Independent
The Man from Downing Street	Edward José	Earle Williams, Boris Karloff, Betty Ross Clarke	Adventure	Vitagraph
The Man from Glengarry	Henry MacRae	Anders Randolf, Warner Richmond, Harlan Knight	Drama	Hodkinson
The Man She Brought Back	Charles Miller	Earle Foxe, Frank Losee	Drama	Independent
The Man Unconquerable	Joseph Henabery	Jack Holt, Sylvia Breamer	Adventure	Paramount
Man to Man	Stuart Paton	Harry Carey, Lillian Rich	Western	Universal
The Man Who Married His Own Wife	Stuart Paton	Frank Mayo, Sylvia Breamer	Drama	Universal
The Man Who Paid	Oscar Apfel	Wilfred Lytell, Norma Shearer	Drama	Independent
The Man Who Played God	F. Harmon Weight	George Arliss, Ann Forrest	Drama	United Artists
The Man Who Saw Tomorrow	Alfred E. Green	Thomas Meighan, Theodore Roberts, Leatrice Joy	Drama	Warner Bros.
The Man Who Waited	Edward Ludwig	Jay Morley, Milla Davenport	Western	Independent
Man Under Cover	Tod Browning	Herbert Rawlinson, George Hernandez	Crime	Universal
Man with Two Mothers	Paul Bern	Cullen Landis, Sylvia Breamer	Comedy	Goldwyn
Man's Law and God's	Finis Fox	Jack Livingston, Ethel Shannon, Rose Melville	Drama	Independent
Manslaughter	Cecil B. DeMille	Leatrice Joy, Thomas Meighan	Drama	Paramount
The Marriage Chance	Hampton Del Ruth	Alta Allen, Milton Sills, Irene Rich	Comedy	Independent
The Married Flapper	Stuart Paton	Marie Prevost, Kenneth Harlan	Comedy	Universal
Married People	Hugo Ballin	Mabel Ballin, Percy Marmont, Ernest Hilliard	Drama	Hodkinson
The Masquerader	James Young	Guy Bates Post, Edward Kimball	Drama	First National
The Men of Zanzibar	Rowland V. Lee	William Russell, Ruth Renick	Mystery	Fox Film
Midnight	Maurice S. Campbell	Constance Binney, Sidney Bracey	Drama	Paramount
Minnie	Marshall Neilan	Leatrice Joy, Matt Moore	Comedy	First National
Missing Millions	Joseph Henabery	Alice Brady, David Powell	Drama	Paramount
Mixed Faces	Rowland V. Lee	William Russell, Renee Adoree, DeWitt Jennings	Comedy	Fox Film
Money to Burn	Rowland V. Lee	William Russell, Sylvia Breamer	Comedy	Fox Film
Monte Cristo	Emmett J. Flynn	John Gilbert, Estelle Taylor	Historical	Fox Film
Moonshine Valley	Herbert Brenon	William Farnum, Anne Shirley	Western	Fox Film
Moran of the Lady Letty	George Melford	Dorothy Dalton, Charles Brinley	Adventure	Paramount
More to Be Pitied Than Scorned	Edward LeSaint	Rosemary Theby, Philo McCullough, Gordon Griffith	Drama	Columbia
Mr. Barnes of New York	Victor Schertzinger	Tom Moore, Anna Lehr	Drama	Goldwyn
Mr. Potter of Texas	Leopold Wharton	Macklyn Arbuckle, Robert Frazer, Corene Uzzell	Comedy	Independent
My American Wife	Sam Wood	Gloria Swanson, Antonio Moreno	Drama	Paramount
My Dad	Clifford Smith	Johnnie Walker, Ruth Clifford	Drama	FBO
My Friend, the Devil	Harry F. Millarde	Charles Richman, Barbara Castleton	Drama	Fox Film
My Wild Irish Rose	David Smith	Pat O'Malley, Pauline Starke	Drama	Vitagraph

== N ==
Title	Director	Cast	Genre	Note
Nancy from Nowhere	Chester Franklin	Bebe Daniels, Eddie Sutherland	Romantic comedy	Paramount
Nanook of the North	Robert J. Flaherty	Allakariallak, Nyla Cunayou	Documentary	Pathé Exchange, Insight into the Inuit
Nero	J. Gordon Edwards	Jacques Grétillat, Sandro Salvini	Historical	Fox Film. Co-production with Italy
The New Teacher	Joseph Franz	Shirley Mason, Allan Forrest	Romance	Fox Film
Nice People	William C. deMille	Wallace Reid, Bebe Daniels	Drama	Paramount
Night Life in Hollywood	Fred Caldwell	J. Frank Glendon, Josephine Hill, Gale Henry	Comedy	Independent
The Ninety and Nine	David Smith	Warner Baxter, Colleen Moore	Drama	Vitagraph
No Trespassing	Edwin L. Hollywood	Irene Castle, Ward Crane	Drama	Independent
North of the Rio Grande	Rollin S. Sturgeon	Bebe Daniels, Jack Holt	Western	Paramount
Notoriety	William Nigh	Mary Alden, Rod La Rocque	Drama	Independent

== O ==
Title	Director	Cast	Genre	Note
Oath-Bound	Bernard J. Durning	Dustin Farnum, Ethel Grey Terry, Fred Thomson	Drama	Fox Film
The Old Homestead	James Cruze	Theodore Roberts, George Fawcett, Fritzi Ridgeway	Drama	Paramount
Oliver Twist	Frank Lloyd	Jackie Coogan, Lon Chaney, Gladys Brockwell	Drama	First National
Omar the Tentmaker	James Young	Guy Bates Post, Virginia Browne Faire	Drama	First National
On the High Seas	Irvin Willat	Dorothy Dalton, Jack Holt	Adventure	Paramount
One Clear Call	John M. Stahl	Milton Sills, Claire Windsor, Irene Rich	Drama	First National
One Eighth Apache	Ben F. Wilson	Roy Stewart, Kathleen Kirkham, Wilbur McGaugh	Western	Arrow
One Exciting Night	D. W. Griffith	Carol Dempster, Henry Hull	Mystery	Universal
One Glorious Day	James Cruze	Will Rogers, Lila Lee	Comedy	Paramount
One Week of Love	George Archainbaud	Elaine Hammerstein, Conway Tearle	Drama	Selznick
One Wonderful Night	Stuart Paton	Herbert Rawlinson, Lillian Rich	Mystery	Universal
Only a Shop Girl	Edward LeSaint	Estelle Taylor, Mae Busch, Wallace Beery	Drama	Columbia
The Ordeal	Paul Powell	Agnes Ayres, Conrad Nagel, Edna Murphy	Drama	Paramount
Other Women's Clothes	Hugo Ballin	Mabel Ballin, Raymond Bloomer, Crauford Kent	Drama	Hodkinson
Our Leading Citizen	Alfred E. Green	Thomas Meighan, Lois Wilson	Comedy	Paramount
Out of the Silent North	William Worthington	Frank Mayo, Barbara Bedford	Drama	Universal
Outcast	Chester Withey	Elsie Ferguson, William Powell	Drama	Paramount
Over the Border	Penryn Stanlaws	Betty Compson, Tom Moore	Romance	Paramount

== P ==
Title	Director	Cast	Genre	Note
Paid Back	Irving Cummings	Gladys Brockwell, Mahlon Hamilton, Stuart Holmes	Drama	Universal
Pardon My Nerve!	B. Reeves Eason	Buck Jones, Mae Busch	Western	Fox Film
A Pasteboard Crown	Travers Vale	Evelyn Greeley, Robert Elliott, Jane Jennings	Drama	Independent
Pawn Ticket 210	Scott R. Dunlap	Shirley Mason, Robert Agnew	Drama	Fox Film
Pawned	Irvin Willat	Tom Moore, Edith Roberts	Drama	Selznick
Peacock Alley	Robert Z. Leonard	Mae Murray, Monte Blue, Edmund Lowe	Drama	Tiffany
Peg o' My Heart	King Vidor	Laurette Taylor, Mahlon Hamilton	Drama	Metro
Penrod	Marshall Neilan	Wesley Barry, Tully Marshall	Comedy drama	First National
Perils of the Yukon	Jay Marchant. J. P. McGowan, Perry N. Vekroff	William Desmond, Laura La Plante	Adventure	Universal
Pink Gods	Penrhyn Stanlaws	Bebe Daniels, Adolphe Menjou, Anna Q. Nilsson	Drama	Paramount
Polly of the Follies	John Emerson	Constance Talmadge, Thomas Carr	Comedy	First National
The Pride of Palomar	Frank Borzage	Forrest Stanley, Marjorie Daw	Drama	Paramount
The Primitive Lover	Sidney Franklin	Constance Talmadge, Harrison Ford	Drama	First National
The Prisoner of Zenda	Rex Ingram	Lewis Stone, Alice Terry	Swashbuckler	Metro
The Prodigal Judge	Edward José	Jean Paige, Earle Foxe	Drama	Vitagraph
The Prophet's Paradise	Alan Crosland	Eugene O'Brien, Sigrid Holmquist	Drama	Selznick

== Q–R ==
Title	Director	Cast	Genre	Note
Queen of the Moulin Rouge	Ray C. Smallwood	Martha Mansfield, Joseph Striker, Jane Thomas	Drama	Independent
A Question of Honor	Edwin Carewe	Anita Stewart, Edward Hearn	Romance	First National
Quincy Adams Sawyer	Clarence G. Badger	John Bowers, Blanche Sweet, Lon Chaney	Comedy drama	Metro
The Ragged Heiress	Harry Beaumont	Shirley Mason, John Harron	Drama	Fox Film
Rags to Riches	Wallace Worsley	Wesley Barry, Niles Welch	Comedy	Warner Bros.
The Rapids	David Hartford	Mary Astor, Harry T. Morey, Walter Miller	Drama	Hodkinson
Real Adventure	King Vidor	Florence Vidor, Clyde Fillmore	Drama	Associated Exhibitors
Received Payment	Charles Maigne	Corinne Griffith, Kenneth Harlan, David Torrence	Drama	Vitagraph
Reckless Youth	Ralph Ince	Elaine Hammerstein, Niles Welch	Drama	Selznick
Red Hot Romance	Victor Fleming	Basil Sydney, May Collins	Comedy	First National
The Referee	Ralph Ince	Conway Tearle, Anders Randolf, Gladys Hulette	Drama	Selznick
Remembrance	Rupert Hughes	Cullen Landis, Claude Gillingwater, Patsy Ruth Miller	Drama	Goldwyn
Rent Free	Howard Higgin	Wallace Reid, Lila Lee	Comedy	Paramount
Reported Missing	Henry Lehrman	Owen Moore, Pauline Garon	Comedy	Selznick
Restless Souls	Robert Ensminger	Earle Williams, Francelia Billington	Drama	Vitagraph
Rich Men's Wives	Louis J. Gasnier	House Peters, Claire Windsor	Drama	Independent
Riders of the Law	Robert N. Bradbury	Jack Hoxie, Marin Sais	Western	Independent
Ridin' Wild	Nat Ross	Hoot Gibson, Edna Murphy	Western	Universal
The Right That Failed	Bayard Veiller	Bert Lytell, Virginia Valli	Drama	Metro
Robin Hood	Allan Dwan	Douglas Fairbanks, Wallace Beery, Enid Bennett	Swashbuckler	United Artists
The Rosary	Jerome Storm	Lewis Stone, Jane Novak, Wallace Beery	Drama	First National
Rose o' the Sea	Fred Niblo	Anita Stewart, Thomas Holding	Drama	First National
Roughshod	B. Reeves Eason	Buck Jones, Helen Ferguson	Western	Fox Film
The Ruling Passion	F. Harmon Weight	George Arliss, Doris Kenyon	Comedy	United Artists

== S ==
Title	Director	Cast	Genre	Note
The Sagebrush Trail	Robert Thornby	Roy Stewart, Marjorie Daw, Wallace Beery	Western	Independent
Saturday Night	Cecil B. DeMille	Leatrice Joy, Conrad Nagel	Romantic comedy	Paramount
The Scrapper	Hobart Henley	Herbert Rawlinson, Gertrude Olmstead	Drama	Universal
Second Hand Rose	Lloyd Ingraham	Gladys Walton, George B. Williams	Romance	Universal
Secrets of Paris	Kenneth S. Webb	Lew Cody, Gladys Hulette	Drama	Independent
Seeing's Believing	Harry Beaumont	Viola Dana, Allan Forrest, Gertrude Astor	Romantic comedy	Metro
The Seventh Day	Henry King	Richard Barthelmess, Frank Losee	Drama	First National
A Self-Made Man	Rowland V. Lee	William Russell, Renee Adoree	Comedy drama	Fox Film
Shackles of Gold	Herbert Brenon	William Farnum, Marie Shotwell	Drama	Fox Film
Shadows	Tom Forman	Lon Chaney, Marguerite De La Motte	Melodrama	Preferred
Shadows of the Sea	Alan Crosland	Conway Tearle, Crauford Kent, Doris Kenyon	Action	Selznick
Shattered Dreams	Paul Scardon	Miss DuPont, Bertram Grassby	Drama	Universal
Shattered Idols	Edward Sloman	Marguerite De La Motte, James Morrison	Drama	First National
Sherlock Brown	Bayard Veiller	Bert Lytell, Sylvia Breamer, Theodore von Eltz	Comedy drama	Metro
Sherlock Holmes	Albert Parker	John Barrymore, Roland Young	Mystery	Goldwyn
Shifting Sands	Fred LeRoy Granville	Peggy Hyland, Louis Willoughby	Drama	Hodkinson
Shirley of the Circus	Rowland V. Lee	Shirley Mason, George O'Hara	Drama	Fox Film
The Sign of the Rose	Harry Garson	George Beban, Jeanne Carpenter, Stanhope Wheatcroft	Drama	Independent
Silas Marner	Frank P. Donovan	Marguerite Courtot, Crauford Kent	Drama	Associated Exhibitors
The Silent Vow	William Duncan	Edith Johnson, Dorothy Dwan	Action	Vitagraph
Silver Spurs	Henry McCarty	Lester Cuneo, Bert Sprotte, Zalla Zarana	Western	Independent
Silver Wings	Edwin Carewe, John Ford	Mary Carr, Percy Helton	Drama	Fox Film
The Sin Flood	Frank Lloyd	Richard Dix, Helene Chadwick	Drama	Goldwyn
Singed Wings	Penrhyn Stanlaws	Bebe Daniels, Conrad Nagel, Adolphe Menjou	Romance	Paramount
The Siren Call	Irvin Willat	Dorothy Dalton, David Powell	Drama	Paramount
Sisters	Albert Capellani	Seena Owen, Gladys Leslie, Matt Moore	Drama	Independent
Skin Deep	Lambert Hillyer	Milton Sills, Florence Vidor	Crime	First National
Sky High	Lynn Reynolds	Tom Mix, Eva Novak	Western	Fox Film
The Sleepwalker	Edward LeSaint	Constance Binney, Jack Mulhall	Drama	Paramount
Slim Shoulders	Alan Crosland	Irene Castle, Rod La Rocque	Drama	Independent
Smiles Are Trumps	George Marshall	Maurice "Lefty" Flynn, Ora Carew	Action	Fox Film
Smilin' Through	Sidney Franklin	Norma Talmadge, Wyndham Standing, Harrison Ford	Romantic Drama	First National
Smudge	Charles Ray	Charles Ray, Ora Carew	Comedy	First National
The Snitching Hour	Alan Crosland	Arthur Housman, Gladys Leslie, Nita Naldi	Comedy	Independent
The Snowshoe Trail	Chester Bennett	Jane Novak, Lloyd Whitlock	Action	FBO
Solomon in Society	Lawrence C. Windom	Charles Delaney, Lillian Herlein	Drama	Independent
The Son of the Wolf	Norman Dawn	Wheeler Oakman, Edith Roberts	Drama	FBO
The Song of Life	John M. Stahl	Gaston Glass, Grace Darmond	Drama	First National
Sonny	Henry King	Richard Barthelmess, Margaret Seddon	Drama	First National
South of Suva	Frank Urson	Mary Miles Minter, Winifred Bryson	Drama	Paramount
A Stage Romance	Herbert Brenon	William Farnum, Peggy Shaw	Historical	Fox Film
Step on It!	Jack Conway	Hoot Gibson, Edith Yorke	Western	Universal
The Storm	Reginald Barker	Matt Moore, Virginia Valli	Drama	Universal
Strange Idols	Bernard J. Durning	Dustin Farnum, Doris Pawn	Drama	Fox Film
The Strangers' Banquet	Marshall Neilan	Hobart Bosworth, Claire Windsor	Drama	Goldwyn
The Strength of the Pines	Edgar Lewis	William Russell, Irene Rich	Drama	Fox Film
Sunshine Harbor	Edward L. Hemmer	Howard Hall, Ralf Harolde	Drama	Associated Exhibitors
The Super-Sex	Lambert Hillyer	Robert Gordon, Charlotte Pierce, Tully Marshall	Comedy	Independent

== T ==
Title	Director	Cast	Genre	Note
A Tailor-Made Man	Joe De Grasse	Charles Ray, Tom Ricketts	Comedy	United Artists
Tess of the Storm Country	John S. Robertson	Mary Pickford, Lloyd Hughes, Gloria Hope	Drama	United Artists
That Woman	Harry O. Hoyt	Catherine Calvert, William Black, William Ricciardi	Drama	Independent
Thelma	Chester Bennett	Jane Novak, Barbara Tennant, Vernon Steele	Drama	FBO
They Like 'Em Rough	Harry Beaumont	Viola Dana, Hardee Kirkland	Comedy	Metro
The Third Alarm	Emory Johnson	Johnnie Walker, Ella Hall	Drama	FBO
Thirty Days	James Cruze	Wallace Reid, Wanda Hawley	Comedy	Paramount
Thorns and Orange Blossoms	Louis J. Gasnier	Estelle Taylor, Kenneth Harlan	Romance	Preferred
The Three Buckaroos	Fred J. Balshofer	Fred Humes, Peggy O'Day, Monte Montague	Western	Independent
The Three Must-Get-Theres	Max Linder	Max Linder, Jobyna Ralston	Comedy	United Artists
Through a Glass Window	Maurice S. Campbell	May McAvoy, Fanny Midgley, Raymond McKee	Drama	Paramount
Thundering Hoofs	Francis Ford	Peggy O'Day, Francis Ford, James T. Kelley	Drama	Independent
Till We Meet Again	Christy Cabanne	Julia Swayne Gordon, Mae Marsh	Drama	Independent
Tillie	Frank Urson	Mary Miles Minter, Noah Beery	Drama	Paramount
To Have and to Hold	George Fitzmaurice	Bert Lytell, Betty Compson	Drama	Paramount
The Toll of the Sea	Chester M. Franklin	Anna May Wong, Kenneth Harlan	Drama	Metro
Tom Mix in Arabia	Lynn Reynolds	Tom Mix, Barbara Bedford	Action	Fox Film
Top o' the Morning	Edward Laemmle	Gladys Walton, Harry Myers	Romance	Universal
The Top of New York	William Desmond Taylor	May McAvoy, Walter McGrail	Drama	Paramount
The Town That Forgot God	Harry F. Millarde	Warren William, Jane Thomas	Drama	Fox Film
Tracks	Joseph Franz	Bill Patton, George Berrell	Western	Independent
Tracked to Earth	William Worthington	Frank Mayo, Virginia Valli	Western	Universal
Trail of the Axe	Ernest C. Warde	Dustin Farnum, Winifred Kingston, Joseph J. Dowling	Drama	Independent
The Trap	Robert Thornby	Lon Chaney, Alan Hale, Irene Rich	Drama	Universal
Travelin' On	Lambert Hillyer	William S. Hart, Ethel Grey Terry	Western	Paramount
Trifling Women	Rex Ingram	Barbara La Marr, Ramon Novarro	Drama	Metro
Trimmed	Harry A. Pollard	Hoot Gibson, Patsy Ruth Miller	Western	Universal
Trooper O'Neill	Scott R. Dunlap	Buck Jones, Beatrice Burnham	Western	Fox Film
Trouble	Albert Austin	Jackie Coogan, Wallace Beery, Gloria Hope	Comedy	First National
The Trouper	Harry B. Harris	Gladys Walton, Jack Perrin	Comedy drama	Universal
The Truthful Liar	Thomas N. Heffron	Wanda Hawley, Guy Edward Hearn	Mystery	Paramount
Turn to the Right	Rex Ingram	Alice Terry, Jack Mulhall	Comedy drama	Metro
Too Much Business	Jess Robbins	Edward Everett Horton, Ethel Grey Terry	Comedy	Vitagraph
Too Much Wife	Thomas N. Heffron	Wanda Hawley, T. Roy Barnes	Comedy	Paramount
Two Kinds of Women	Colin Campbell	Pauline Frederick, Tom Santschi	Western	FBO

== U ==
Title	Director	Cast	Genre	Note
Unconquered Woman	Marcel Perez	Rubye De Remer, Walter Miller	Drama	Independent
Under Oath	George Archainbaud	Elaine Hammerstein, Niles Welch	Drama	Selznick
Under Two Flags	Tod Browning	Priscilla Dean, James Kirkwood	Drama	Universal
The Understudy	William A. Seiter	Doris May, Wallace MacDonald	Comedy	FBO
Up and at 'Em	William A. Seiter	Doris May, Hallam Cooley	Romantic comedy	FBO
Up and Going	Lynn Reynolds	Cecil Van Auker, Carol Holloway	Action	Fox Film

== V ==
Title	Director	Cast	Genre	Note
The Valley of Silent Men	Frank Borzage	Alma Rubens, Lew Cody	Drama	Paramount
The Veiled Woman	Lloyd Ingraham	Marguerite Snow, Edward Coxen, Lottie Williams	Drama	Hodkinson
The Vermilion Pencil	Norman Dawn	Sessue Hayakawa, Ann May	Drama	FBO
Very Truly Yours	Harry Beaumont	Shirley Mason, Allan Forrest	Romance	Fox Film
The Village Blacksmith	John Ford	Will Walling, Virginia True Boardman	Drama	Fox Film
A Virgin's Sacrifice	Webster Campbell	Corinne Griffith, David Torrence	Drama	Vitagraph

== W ==
Title	Director	Cast	Genre	Note
The Wall Flower	Rupert Hughes	Colleen Moore, Richard Dix, Gertrude Astor	Romance	Goldwyn
Watch Him Step	Jack Nelson	Richard Talmadge, Ethel Shannon, Colin Kenny	Comedy	Independent
Watch Your Step	William Beaudine	Cullen Landis, Patsy Ruth Miller, Bert Woodruff, George C. Pearce	Comedy	Goldwyn
West of Chicago	Scott R. Dunlap	Buck Jones, Renée Adorée	Western	Fox Film
Western Speed	Scott R. Dunlap	Buck Jones, Eileen Percy	Western	Fox Film
What Fools Men Are	George Terwilliger	Faire Binney, Lucy Fox, Huntley Gordon	Drama	Independent
What's Wrong with the Women?	Roy William Neill	Wilton Lackaye, Constance Bennett	Drama	Independent
When Danger Smiles	William Duncan	Edith Johnson, James Farley	Western	Vitagraph
When Husbands Deceive	Wallace Worsley	Leah Baird, William Conklin, Eulalie Jensen	Drama	Associated Exhibitors
When Knighthood Was in Flower	Robert G. Vignola	Marion Davies, Forrest Stanley	Romance Drama	Paramount
When Love Comes	William A. Seiter	Helen Jerome Eddy, Harrison Ford	Drama	FBO
When Romance Rides	Jean Hersholt	Claire Adams, Carl Gantvoort	Western	Goldwyn
When the Desert Calls	Ray C. Smallwood	Violet Heming, Robert Frazer, Huntley Gordon	Drama	Independent
When the Devil Drives	Paul Scardon	Leah Baird, Arline Pretty, Richard Tucker	Drama	Associated Exhibitors
While Justice Waits	Bernard J. Durning	Dustin Farnum, Irene Rich	Western	Fox Film
While Satan Sleeps	Joseph Henabery	Jack Holt, Wade Boteler	Western	Paramount
White Hands	Lambert Hillyer	Hobart Bosworth, Elinor Fair	Drama	Metro
White Shoulders	Tom Forman	Katherine MacDonald, Lillian Lawrence	Drama	First National
Who Are My Parents?	J. Searle Dawley	Niles Welch, Ernest Hilliard	Drama	Fox Film
Why Announce Your Marriage?	Alan Crosland	Elaine Hammerstein, Niles Welch	Comedy	Selznick
A Wide Open Town	Ralph Ince	Conway Tearle, Faire Binney	Drama	Selznick
Wild Honey	Wesley Ruggles	Priscilla Dean, Noah Beery Sr.	Adventure	Universal
Wildcat Jordan	Alfred Santell	Richard Talmadge, Eugenia Gilbert, Harry von Meter	Action	Independent
Winning with Wits	Howard M. Mitchell	Barbara Bedford, Harry Northrup	Drama	Fox Film
The Wise Kid	Tod Browning	Gladys Walton, David Butler	Comedy	Universal
What Fools Men Are	George Terwilliger	Faire Binney, Lucy Fox	Drama	Independent
Wildness of Youth	Ivan Abramson	Virginia Pearson, Harry T. Morey	Drama	Independent
The Wise Kid	Tod Browning	Gladys Walton, David Butler	Comedy	Universal
Without Compromise	Emmett J. Flynn	William Farnum, Lois Wilson	Western	Fox Film
Without Fear	Kenneth S. Webb	Pearl White, Robert Elliott	Drama	Fox Film
Wolf Law	Stuart Paton	Frank Mayo, Sylvia Breamer	Drama	Universal
The Woman Conquers	Tom Forman	Katherine MacDonald, Bryant Washburn	Drama	First National
The Woman He Loved	Edward Sloman	William V. Mong, Marcia Manon, Mary Wynn	Drama	Independent
The Woman He Married	Fred Niblo	Anita Stewart, Donald MacDonald, Shannon Day	Drama	First National
The Woman Who Fooled Herself	Charles A. Logue	May Allison, Robert Ellis, Frank Currier	Drama	Associated Exhibitors
The Woman Who Walked Alone	George Melford	Dorothy Dalton, Milton Sills, Wanda Hawley	Drama	Paramount
A Woman's Woman	Charles Giblyn	Mary Alden, Dorothy Mackaill, Holmes Herbert	Drama	Independent
The Woman's Side	J. A. Barry	Katherine MacDonald, Edmund Burns	Drama	First National
Women Men Marry	Edward Dillon	Hedda Hopper, Cyril Chadwick, E.K. Lincoln	Drama	Independent
A Wonderful Wife	Paul Scardon	Miss DuPont, Vernon Steele	Drama	Universal
The World's a Stage	Colin Campbell	Dorothy Phillips, Bruce McRae, Kenneth Harlan	Drama	Independent
The World's Champion	Phil Rosen	Wallace Reid, Lois Wilson	Sports drama	Paramount

== Y–Z ==
Title	Director	Cast	Genre	Note
Yellow Men and Gold	Irvin Willat	Richard Dix, Helene Chadwick	Adventure	Goldwyn
The Yellow Stain	John Francis Dillon	John Gilbert, Claire Anderson	Drama	Fox Film
The Yosemite Trail	Bernard J. Durning	Dustin Farnum, Irene Rich	Western	Fox Film
You Never Know	Robert Ensminger	Earle Williams, Gertrude Astor	Drama	Vitagraph
The Young Diana	Albert Capellani, Robert G. Vignola	Marion Davies, Forrest Stanley	Drama	Paramount
The Young Rajah	Phil Rosen	Rudolph Valentino, Wanda Hawley	Adventure	Paramount
Your Best Friend	William Nigh	Vera Gordon, Harry Benham	Drama	Warner Bros.
Youth Must Have Love	Joseph Franz	Shirley Mason, Wallace MacDonald	Drama	Fox Film
Youth to Youth	Emile Chautard	Billie Dove, Edythe Chapman, Hardee Kirkland	Drama	Metro

== Serials ==
Title	Director	Cast	Genre	Note
The Adventures of Robinson Crusoe	Robert F. Hill	Harry Myers, Noble Johnson	Adventure	Universal. Film serial now lost
The Timber Queen	Fred Jackman	Ruth Roland, Bruce Gordon	Action	Pathé Exchange, Film serial
White Eagle	Fred Jackman	Ruth Roland, Otto Lederer	Western	Pathé Exchange, Film serial

== Shorts ==
Title	Director	Cast	Genre	Note
The Blacksmith	Buster Keaton	Buster Keaton, Virginia Fox	Comedy	First National, Short
Cops	Edward F. Cline, Buster Keaton	Buster Keaton, Virginia Fox	Comedy	First National, Short
Daydreams	Buster Keaton	Buster Keaton, Renée Adorée	Comedy	First National, Short
The Electric House	Buster Keaton	Buster Keaton, Virginia Fox	Comedy	First National, Short
The Frozen North	Buster Keaton	Buster Keaton, Sybil Seely	Comedy	First National, Short
Mud and Sand	Gilbert Pratt	Stan Laurel, Leona Anderson	Comedy	Metro, Short
My Wife's Relations	Buster Keaton	Buster Keaton, Monte Collins	Comedy	First National, Short
The Paleface	Edward F. Cline, Buster Keaton	Buster Keaton, Virginia Fox	Comedy	First National, Short
Pay Day	Charlie Chaplin	Charlie Chaplin, Phyllis Allen, Mack Swain	Comedy	First National, Short

== See also ==
- 1922 in the United States
