= The Veiled Woman =

The Veiled Woman may refer to:

- The Veiled Woman (1917 film), a British film directed by Leedham Bantock
- The Veiled Woman (1922 film), an American film
- The Veiled Woman (1929 film), an American film
