= Fortune's Mask =

1922 American silent film by Robert Ensminger

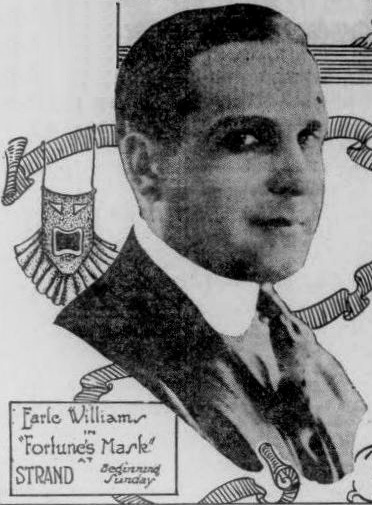
- Newspaper advertisement
- Directed by: Robert Ensminger
- Written by: C. Graham Baker; O. Henry
- Produced by: Albert E. Smith
- Starring: Earle Williams
- Cinematography: W. Steve Smith Jr.
- Distributed by: Vitagraph Company of America
- Release date: October 22, 1922
- Running time: 50 minutes
- Country: United States
- Language: Silent (English intertitles)

Fortune's Mask is a 1922 American drama film starring Earle Williams and featuring Oliver Hardy. It is unknown whether any print of the film survives; it may be a lost film.

== Cast ==
- Earle Williams as Ramón Olivarra (aka Dicky Maloney)
- Patsy Ruth Miller as Pasa Ortiz
- Henry Hebert as Losada
- Milton Ross as General Pilar
- Eugenie Forde as Madame Ortiz
- Arthur Tavares as Vicenti
- Frank Whitson as Espiración
- Oliver Hardy as Chief of Police
- William McCall as Captain Cronin

== See also ==
- List of American films of 1922
- Oliver Hardy filmography
