= Her Country First =

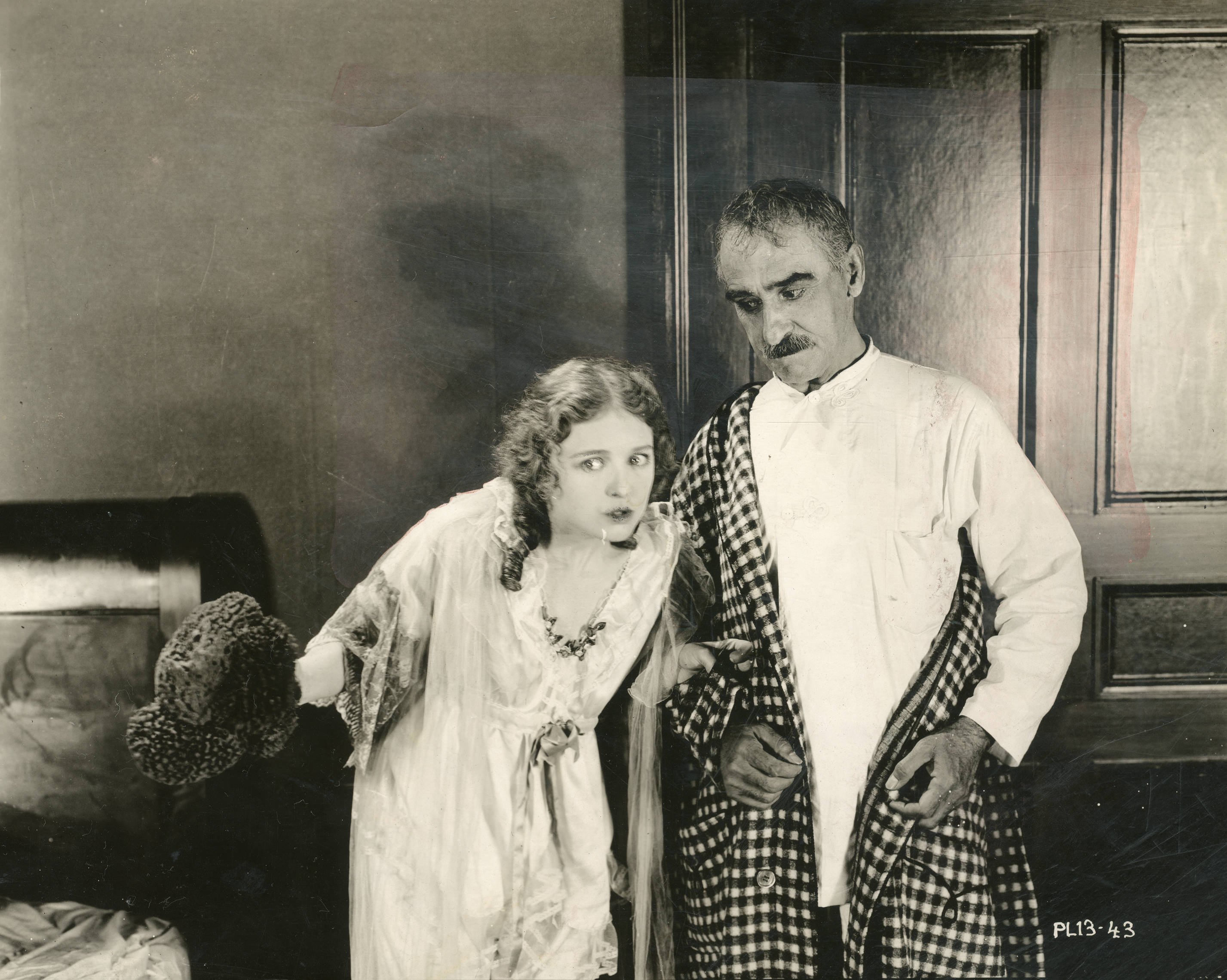
- Film still
- Directed by: James Young
- Screenplay by: Edith Kennedy; Mary Roberts Rinehart
- Produced by: Jesse L. Lasky
- Starring: Vivian Martin; John Cossar; Florence Oberle; J. Parks Jones; Larry Steers; Bernadine Zuber
- Cinematography: Frank E. Garbutt
- Production company: Famous Players–Lasky Corporation
- Distributed by: Paramount Pictures
- Release date: September 22, 1918
- Running time: 50 minutes
- Country: United States
- Language: Silent (English intertitles)

Her Country First is a 1918 American comedy silent film directed by James Young and written by Edith Kennedy and Mary Roberts Rinehart. The film stars Vivian Martin, John Cossar, Florence Oberle, J. Parks Jones, Larry Steers, and Bernadine Zuber. The film was released on September 22, 1918, by Paramount Pictures.

There are no listings for this film in the Library of Congress's database which suggest that it is a lost film.

== Plot ==
Dorothy Grant returns from boarding school so fired up with patriotism that she organizes her friends into a military company they call the Girls' Aviation Corps with help from a woman farmer who served in the military. Dorothy then discovers that German spies have come to town to get access to her father's munitions plant.

== Cast ==
- Vivian Martin as Dorothy Grant
- John Cossar as Franklin Grant
- Florence Oberle as Mrs. Grant
- J. Parks Jones as Craig Allison
- Larry Steers as Dr. Barnes
- Bernadine Zuber as Isabelle Grant
- Louis Willoughby as The Butler, William
- Jim Farley as Henry The Chauffeur
- Lillian Leighton as The Cook, Lena
- Jack McDonald as Farmer
- Audrey Chapman as Jane
- Marcella Daly as Lucie
