= Florence Oberle =

American actress

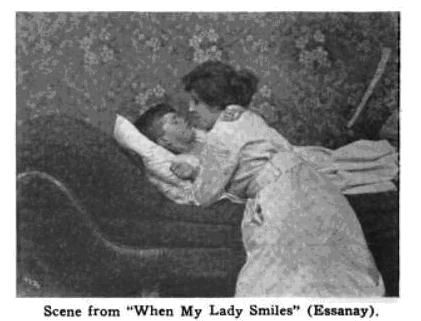
- Born: 1867 or 1868; Tarrytown, New York, U.S.
- Died: July 10, 1943 (aged 73); Glendale, California, U.S.
- Occupation: Actress
- Spouse: Thomas Oberle
- Children: 1

Florence Oberle (1867 or 1868 – July 10, 1943) was a stage and film actress from Tarrytown, New York.

== Early life and career ==
Born Florence Gertrude Kelly, in about 1869, to Michael J. Kelly, a newspaper man from New York City, and his wife Frances H. Kelly.

She married Thomas Oberle, an actor, on February 25, 1895 in Tarrytown, New York. Their a son, Jack, was born in 1898. They moved to Los Angeles, California in 1902. That year, Jack, then aged 4, was to appear in a child role in a play alongside his father, but Florence was the one able to manage him, and so she was also cast in the role of a nurse; this was the beginning of her acting career. Thomas died in 1906.

Oberle appeared in Morosco Theatre and David Belasco productions. She was once billed as "the most beautiful woman on the American stage." In California Oberle played opposite theatrical stars like Edward Everett Horton and Trixie Friganza. Her last appearance on stage came in 1931, performing with Jane Cowl in Camille.

In 1915 Oberle signed with Essanay Studios, a pioneer film studio of the silent movie era. She also performed with Charles Ray and other Hollywood actors at Keystone Studios, Triangle Studios, and Famous Players. Among her films are The White Sister (1915), When My Lady Smiles (1915), The Prince of Graustark (1916), Skinner's Dress Suit (1917), Her Country First (1918), Haunting Shadows (1919), The Barnstormer (1922), Smudge (1922), and Three Hollywood Girls (1931).

== Later life and death ==
Oberle lived in Chicago, Illinois, for three years. When she retired she came to reside in Los Angeles, California, in 1931. Her home was at 1237 West 96th Street.

Oberle died at the Little Romano Sanitarium in North Glendale, California, on July 11, 1943. She was 73 years old.
