= West of Mojave =

1925 film

- Directed by: Harry L. Fraser
- Written by: Charles Edwards
- Produced by: Harry L. Fraser
- Starring: Gordon Clifford; Charlotte Pierce; Frank Lackteen
- Production company: Bear Productions
- Distributed by: Aywon Film Corporation
- Release date: November 11, 1925
- Running time: 50 minutes
- Country: United States
- Languages: Silent; English intertitles

West of Mojave is a 1925 American silent Western film directed by Harry L. Fraser and starring Gordon Clifford, Charlotte Pierce and Frank Lackteen.

== Cast ==
- Gordon Clifford
- Charlotte Pierce
- Frank Lackteen
- James McElhern
- Dorothea Wolbert

== Bibliography ==
- Langman, Larry. A Guide to Silent Westerns. Greenwood Publishing Group, 1992.
