= Mary Wynn =

American actress

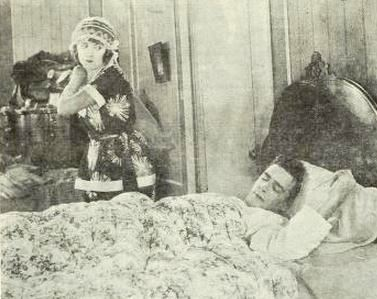
- Wynn with Harry Edwards in the comedy short Rest in Peace (1921)
- Born: Phoebe Isabelle Bassor Watson; 13 March 1902; San Francisco, California
- Died: 22 December 2001 (aged 99); Calabasas, California
- Burial place: Oakwood Memorial Park Cemetery

Phoebe Isabelle Bassor Watson Rosenfeld (13 March 1902 – 22 December 2001), known professionally as Mary Wynn, was an American film actress of the silent film era.

== Biography ==
Born Phoebe Isabelle Bassor in San Francisco, California, she began her acting career with a 1914 role in False Pride, starring Jennie Lee and Charles Gorman. Her biggest film, in which she had a minor role, was in the 1915 classic film The Birth of a Nation, starring Lillian Gish, Mae Marsh, and directed by D. W. Griffith. In 1920 she would star opposite James Harrison in Hot Stuff.

From 1920 to 1923 she appeared in nineteen films. Some sources have her possibly credited with a role in the 1929 film Crashing Through, but as to whether or not she is in that film has never been confirmed beyond a doubt. Not including that film, she is officially credited with having appeared in twenty-one films during her short career. She was residing in Calabasas, California at the time of her death on December 22, 2001. And at the age of 99, she was the last living cast member of The Birth of a Nation.

== Filmography ==
Year	Title	Role	Notes
1915	The Birth of a Nation	Minor Role	Uncredited
1921	The Man Who Smiled		
1922	Shattered Idols	Ethel Hathaway	
1922	The Woman He Loved	Helen Comstock	
1923	The Power Divine	Sally Slocum	
1923	Danger	Phyllis Baxter	
1923	The Range Patrol		
1928	Crashing Through		(final film role)
