= The Woman He Loved (1922 film) =

1922 film

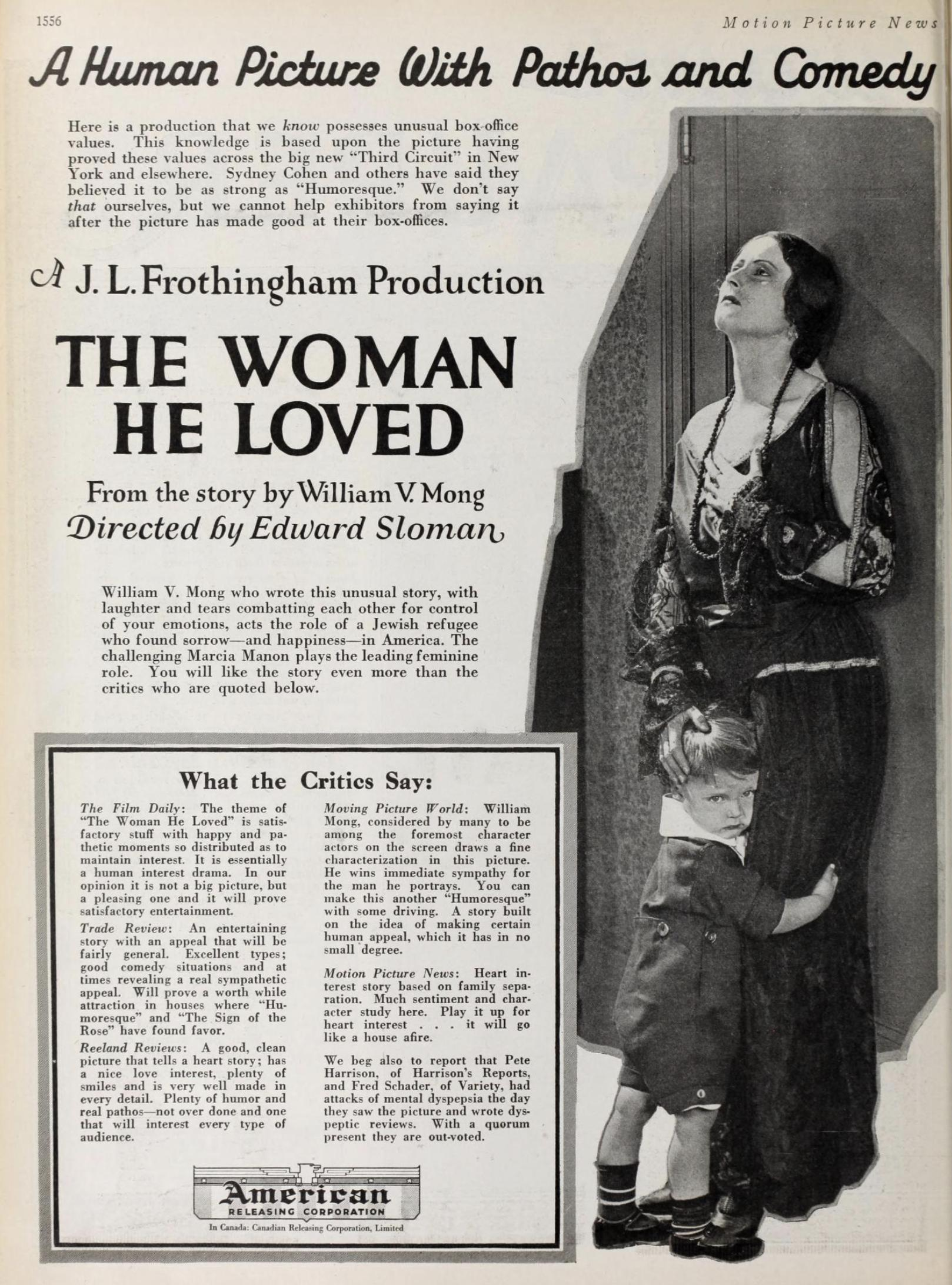
- Directed by: Edward Sloman
- Written by: William V. Mong
- Starring: William V. Mong; Marcia Manon; Mary Wynn
- Cinematography: Tony Gaudio
- Production company: J.L. Frothingham Productions
- Distributed by: American Releasing Corporation
- Release date: October 1, 1922
- Running time: 50 minutes
- Country: United States
- Languages: Silent; English intertitles

The Woman He Loved is a 1922 American silent drama film directed by Edward Sloman and starring William V. Mong, Marcia Manon and Mary Wynn.

== Cast ==
- William V. Mong as Nathan Levinsky
- Marcia Manon as Esther Levinsky
- A. Edward Sutherland as Jimmy Danvers
- Mary Wynn as Helen Comstock
- Charles K. French as John Comstock
- Fred Malatesta as Max Levy
- Harvey Clark as John Danvers
- Bruce Guerin as David Levinsky, as a child
- Lucille Ward as Rosie Romansky

== Bibliography ==
- Bell, Geoffrey. The Golden Gate and the Silver Screen. Associated University Presse, 1984 .
- Connelly, Robert B. The Silents: Silent Feature Films, 1910-36, Volume 40, Issue 2. December Press, 1998.
- Munden, Kenneth White. The American Film Institute Catalog of Motion Pictures Produced in the United States, Part 1. University of California Press, 1997.
