= Charlotte Pierce =

American actress

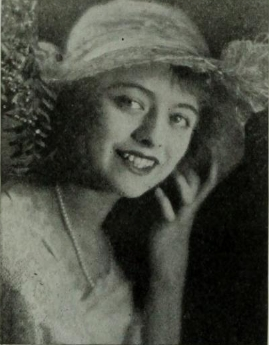
- Publicity photo (probably for Peaceful Valley) from the April 23, 1921, issue of the publication Camera!
- Born: October 22, 1904; Girard, Illinois, U.S.
- Died: November 23, 1996 (aged 92); Los Angeles, California, U.S.
- Occupation: actress
- Known for: silent films

Charlotte Pierce (October 22, 1904 – November 23, 1996) was an American actress in silent films.

== Early life ==
Charlotte Elaine Pierce was born in Girard, Illinois, and raised in Salina, Kansas, the daughter of Schuyler Rensselaer Pierce and Faye Ransom Pierce. Her father was an engineer involved in construction.

== Career ==
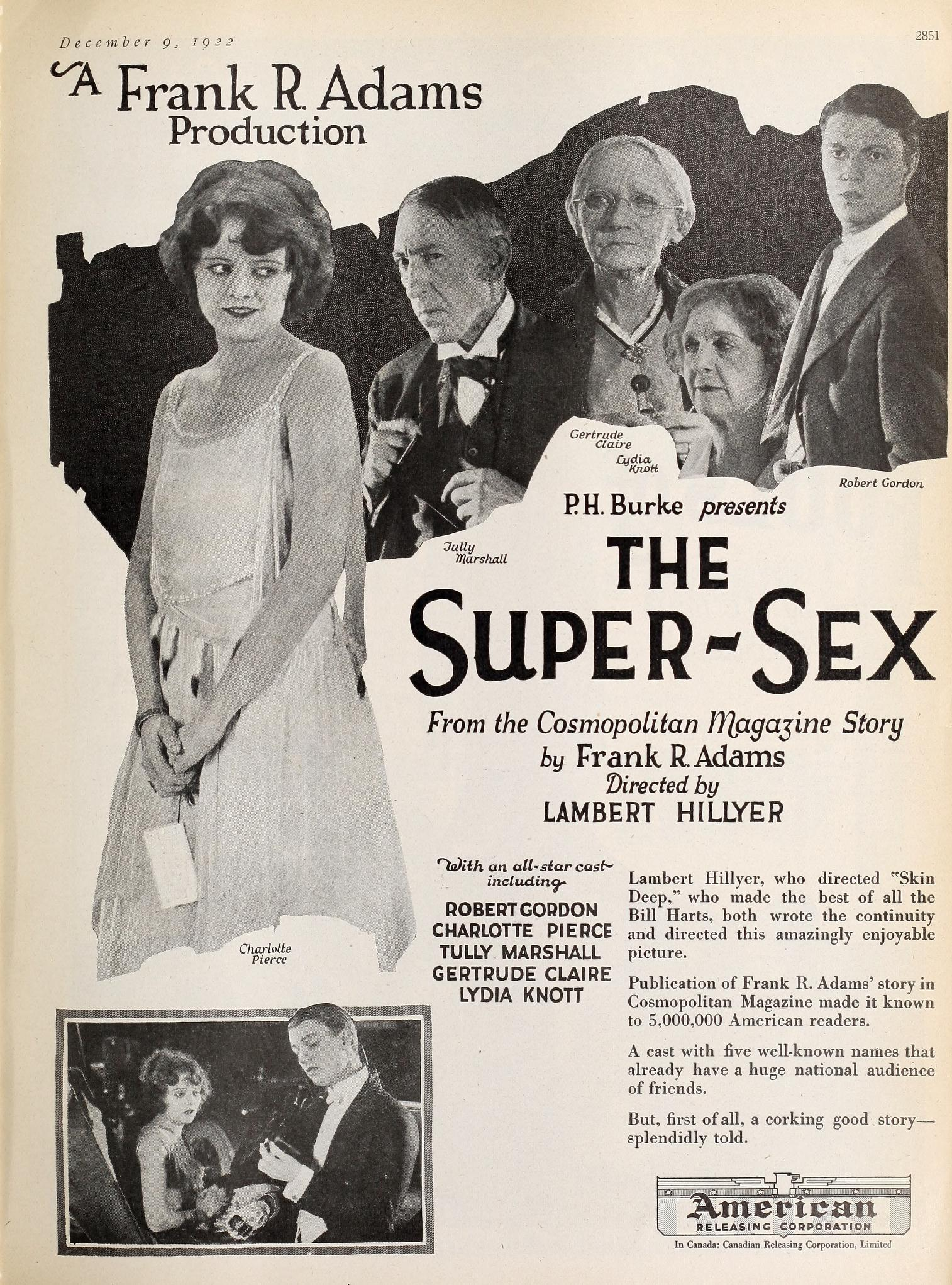
Advertisement for The Super-Sex (1922), starring Charlotte Pierce.

Pierce was a dancer and dance teacher as a young woman. She was helped into movies by actress Cathrine Curtis and by screenwriter Elinor Glyn.

Pierce appeared in silent films beginning in her teen years, as "an ingenue of the Pickford type".

== Personal life ==
Charlotte Pierce married actor and musician William Virgil Mays in 1922. They divorced in 1923. In 1926, she married a second time, to Salvino J. "Solly" Baiano, a talent scout, casting director, violinist, and tennis champion. They had a daughter, Lonnie, and a son, Michael. Both of their children acted in films. Michael Baiano married singer Jaye P. Morgan in 1954. Charlotte Pierce Baiano was widowed when Solly Baiano died in 1992, and she died in Los Angeles, November 23, 1996, aged 92 years. Her grave is with her husband's, in Holy Cross Cemetery in Culver City, California.

== Selected filmography ==
- Peaceful Valley (1921)
- The Man of the Forest (1921)
- The Veiled Woman (1922)
- The Woman He Married (1922)
- The Barnstormer (1922)
- Gas, Oil and Water (1922)
- The Woman He Married (1922)
- The Super-Sex (1922)
- Colleen of the Pines (1922)
- A Tailor-Made Man (1922)
- The Veiled Woman (1922)
- The Lavender Bath Lady (1922)
- The Super-Sex (1922)
- Thru the Flames (1923)
- The Courtship of Miles Standish (1923)
- Sky's the Limit (1925)
- The Wildcat (1925)
- Queen of Spades (1925)
- West of Mojave (1925)
- The Sheep Trail (1926)
- The Fighting Gob (1926).
