= The Barnstormer (film) =

1922 film by Charles Ray

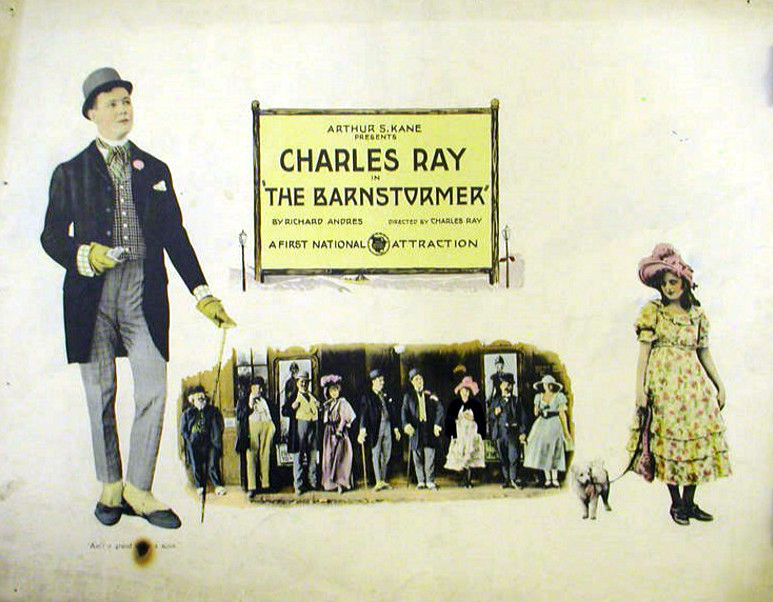
- Lobby card
- Directed by: Charles Ray
- Written by: Edward Withers (titles)
- Story by: Richard Andres
- Produced by: Arthur S. Kane
- Starring: Charles Ray; Wilfred Lucas; Florence Oberle; Lionel Belmore
- Cinematography: George Rizard
- Edited by: Harry L. Decker
- Production company: Charles Ray Productions
- Distributed by: Associated First National
- Release date: January 1922
- Running time: 6 reels
- Country: United States
- Language: Silent (English intertitles)

The Barnstormer is a 1922 American silent comedy film directed by Charles Ray and written by Richard Andres and Edward Withers. The film stars Charles Ray, Wilfred Lucas, Florence Oberle, Lionel Belmore, Phil Dunham, Gus Leonard, Lincoln Plumer, Charlotte Pierce, George Nichols, and Blanche Rose. The film was released in January 1922 by Associated First National.

== Plot ==
As described in a film magazine, Joel Matthews, a farmer's son, aspires to become an actor. A visiting acting troupe gives him his opportunity, and he becomes a porter, call boy, piano player, stage hand, and finally an actor with two lines. His model in all things is the Leading Man, whose every move he imitates.

In a small town he meets and falls in love with the Emily, daughter of the druggist. The play is in town for a week. While playing to a full house, the Leading Man, disguised as a burglar, holds up the audience and hides in his dressing room.

Joel discovers him and the loot, and, when he forces the Leading Man to return the money, he wins both the plaudits of the townspeople and the hand of Emily.

== Cast ==
- Charles Ray as Joel
- Wilfred Lucas as Leading Man
- Florence Oberle as Leading Lady
- Lionel Belmore as Manager
- Phil Dunham as Stage Carpenter
- Gus Leonard as Theater Owner
- Lincoln Plumer as Druggist
- Charlotte Pierce as Emily
- George Nichols as Joel's father
- Blanche Rose as Joel's mother
- Bert Offord as the Nut

== Preservation ==
The film is now considered lost.

== Gallery ==
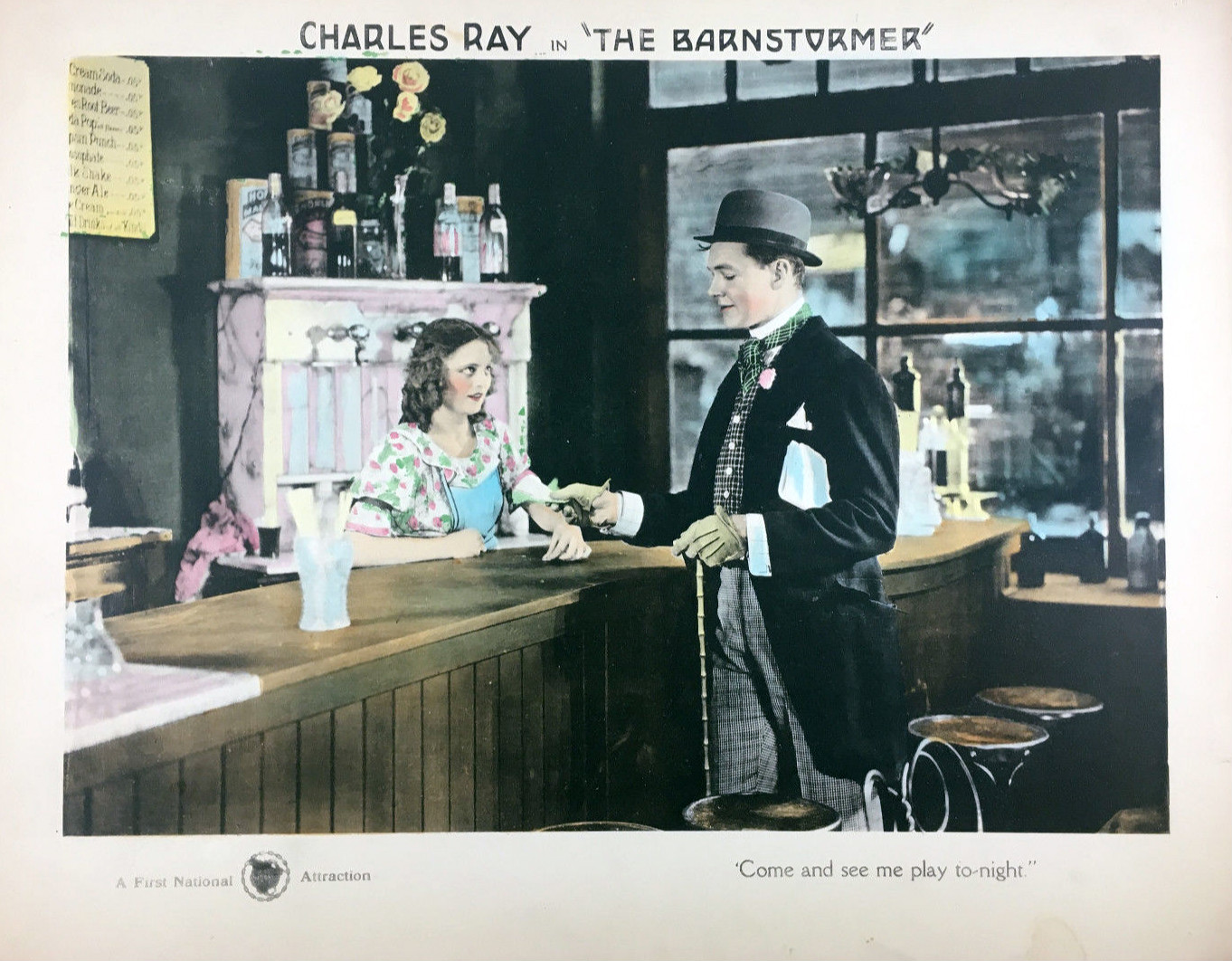
Lobby card (2/3)

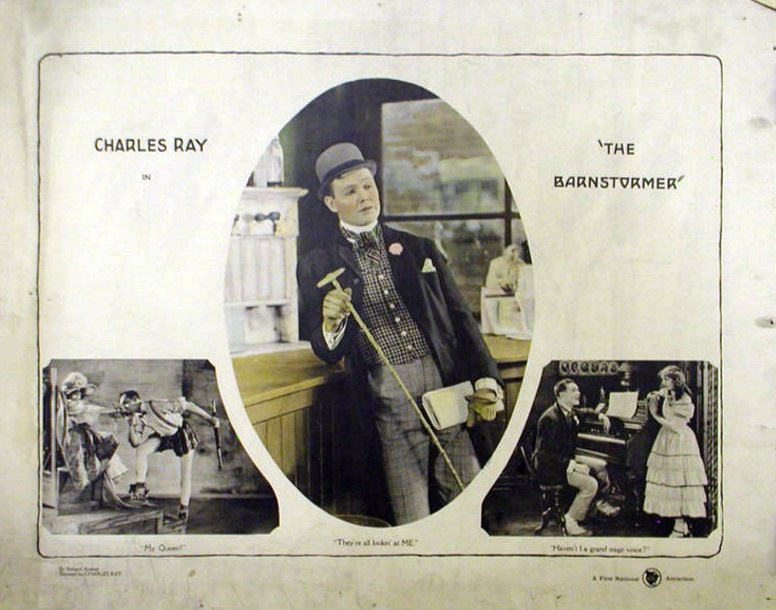
Lobby card (3/3)
