= The Lavender Bath Lady =

1922 film

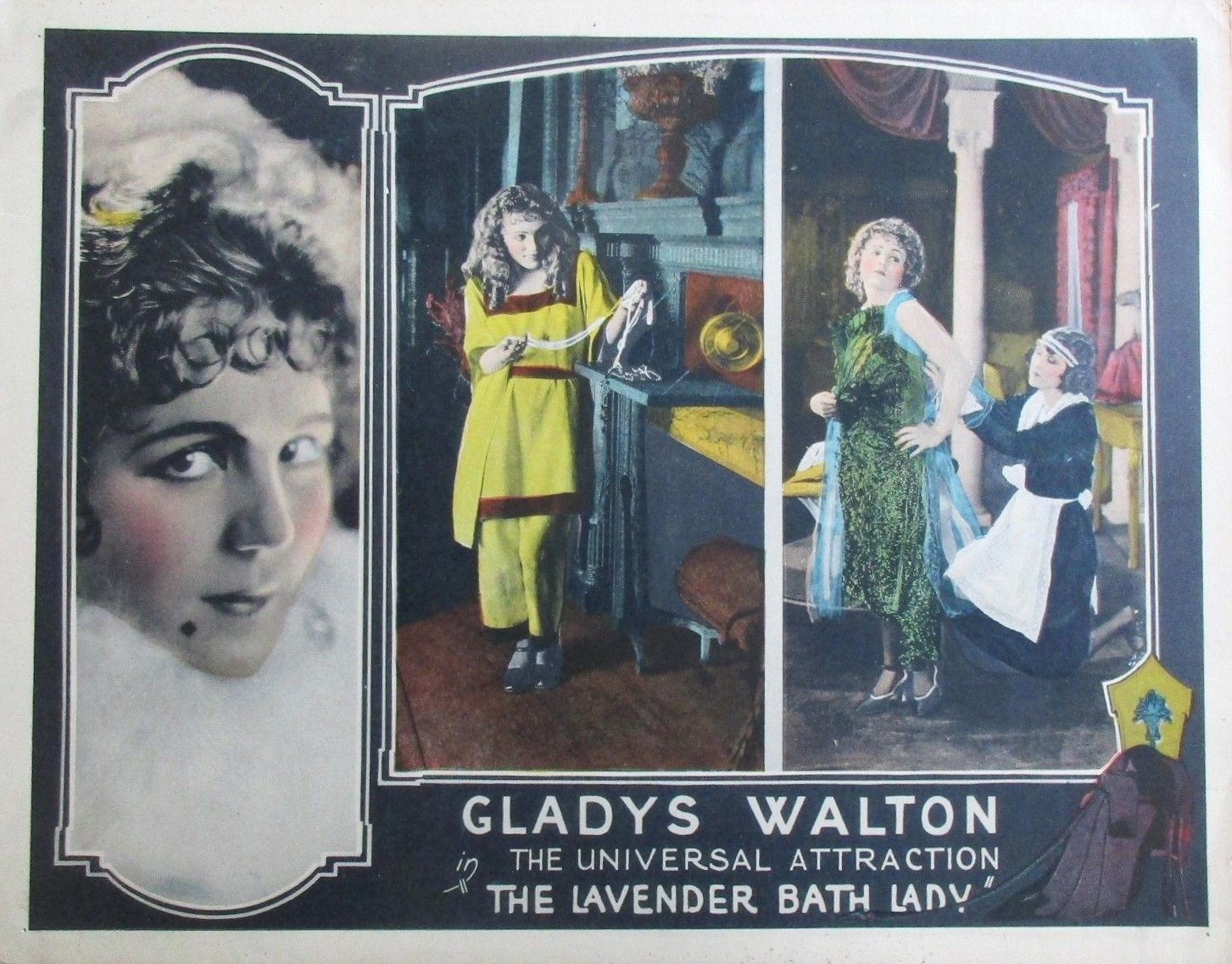
- Lobby card
- Directed by: King Baggot
- Screenplay by: George Randolph Chester; Doris Schroeder
- Story by: Shannon Fife
- Starring: Gladys Walton; Charlotte Pierce; Edmund Burns; Tom Ricketts; Lydia Yeamans Titus; Mary Winston
- Cinematography: Victor Milner
- Production company: Universal Film Manufacturing Company
- Distributed by: Universal Film Manufacturing Company
- Release date: November 13, 1922
- Running time: 50 minutes
- Country: United States
- Language: Silent (English intertitles)

The Lavender Bath Lady is a 1922 American silent comedy film directed by King Baggot and written by George Randolph Chester and Doris Schroeder. The film stars Gladys Walton, Charlotte Pierce, Edmund Burns, Tom Ricketts, Lydia Yeamans Titus, and Mary Winston. The film was released on November 13, 1922, by Universal Film Manufacturing Company.

== Cast ==
- Gladys Walton as Mamie Conroy
- Charlotte Pierce as Jeanette Gregory
- Edmund Burns as David Bruce
- Tom Ricketts as Simon Gregory
- Lydia Yeamans Titus as Maggie
- Mary Winston as Susanne
- Albert MacQuarrie as Dorgan
- Harry Lorraine as Drake
- Earl Crain as Hallet

== Preservation ==
As no copies of The Lavender Bath Lady are listed by any film archive, it is a lost film.
