= The Madness of Love (film) =

1922 film by Wray Physioc

- Directed by: Wray Physioc
- Written by: Wray Physioc
- Produced by: Wray Physioc
- Starring: Jean Scott; Charles Craig; Bernard Siegel
- Production company: Wray Physioc Co.
- Distributed by: Wid Gunning
- Release date: April 1922 (US)
- Running time: 5 reels
- Country: United States
- Language: English

The Madness of Love is a lost 1922 American silent drama film written and directed by Wray Physioc. The film stars Jean Scott, Charles Craig, and Bernard Siegel.

== Cast list ==
- Jean Scott as Mary Anne Strong
- Charles Craig as Capt. James Strong
- Bernard Siegel as Sim Calloway
- Willard Cooley as David Calloway
- Ivan Christy as Ben Tompkins
- Richard Lee as Dr. Abel Hanks

== Preservation ==
With no holdings located in archives, The Madness of Love is considered a lost film.
