= The Super-Sex =

1922 film

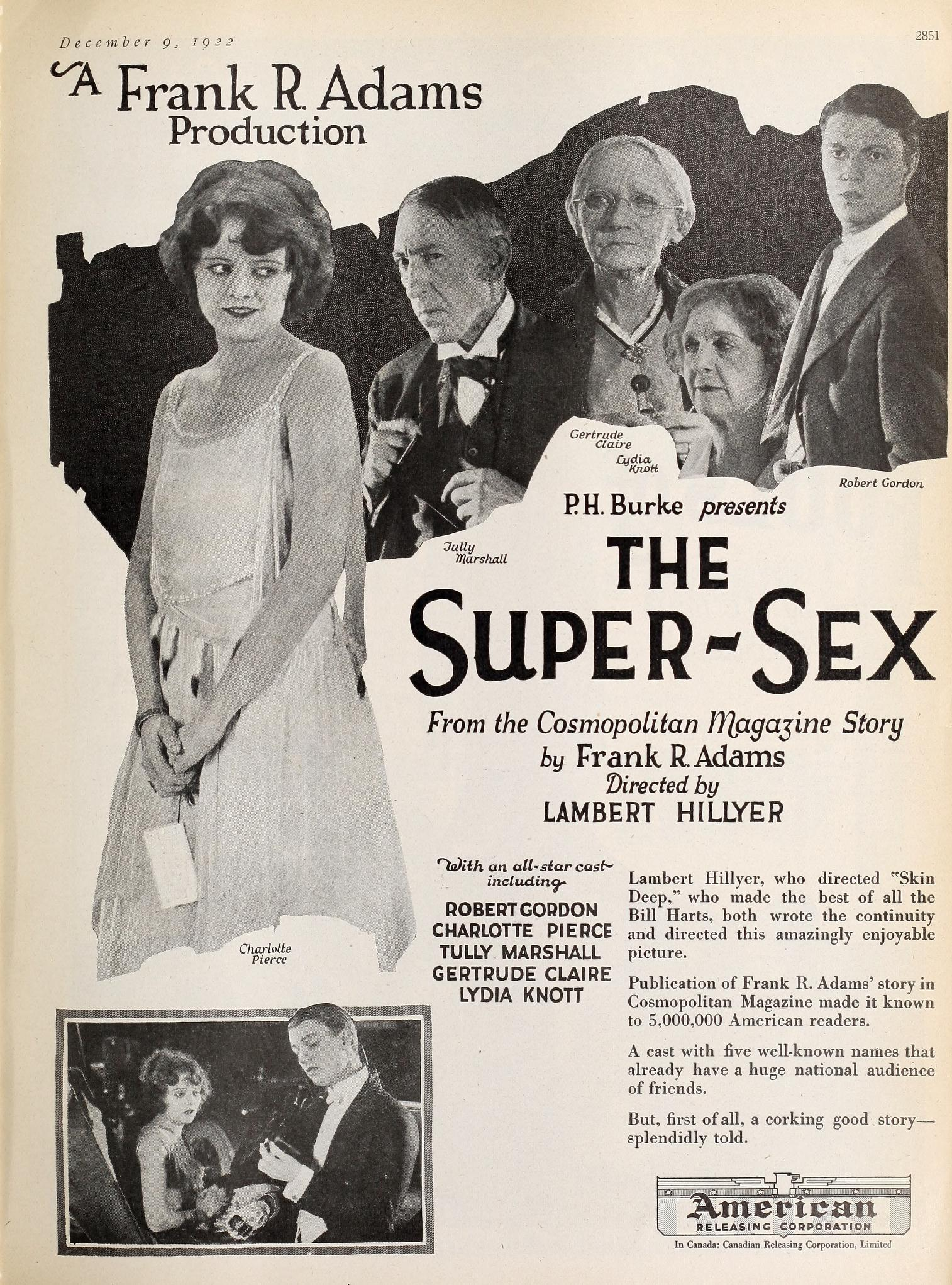
- Directed by: Lambert Hillyer
- Written by: Frank R. Adams; Lambert Hillyer
- Based on: Miles Brewster and the Super Sex by Frank R. Adams
- Produced by: P.H. Burke
- Starring: Robert Gordon; Charlotte Pierce; Tully Marshall
- Cinematography: John Stumar
- Production company: Frank R. Adams Productions
- Distributed by: American Releasing Corporation
- Release date: November 19, 1922
- Running time: 60 minutes
- Country: United States
- Languages: Silent; English intertitles

The Super-Sex is a 1922 American silent comedy film directed by Lambert Hillyer and starring Robert Gordon, Charlotte Pierce and Tully Marshall.

== Cast ==
- Robert Gordon as Miles Brewster Higgins
- Charlotte Pierce as Irene Hayes
- Tully Marshall as Mr. Higgins
- Lydia Knott as Mrs. Higgins
- Gertrude Claire as Grandma Brewster
- Albert MacQuarrie as Cousin Roy
- Louis Natheaux as J. Gordon Davis
- George Bunny as Mr. Hayes
- Evelyn Burns as Mrs. Hayes

== Production ==
The Super-Sex is based on a story written by Frank R. Adams, Miles Brewster and the Super Sex, for Cosmopolitan magazine. Filming began on September 22, 1922, with Robert Gordon, Charlotte Pierce, and Tully Marshall starring. John Stumar served as the cinematographer.

== Reception ==
Upon release the film received favorable reviews from outlets such as Variety and The Shreveport Journal. A reviewer for The Shreveport Times praised the story, stating that they found the characters realistic.

== Bibliography ==
- Connelly, Robert B. The Silents: Silent Feature Films, 1910-36, Volume 40, Issue 2. December Press, 1998.
- Munden, Kenneth White. The American Film Institute Catalog of Motion Pictures Produced in the United States, Part 1. University of California Press, 1997.
