= The Woman He Married =

1922 film

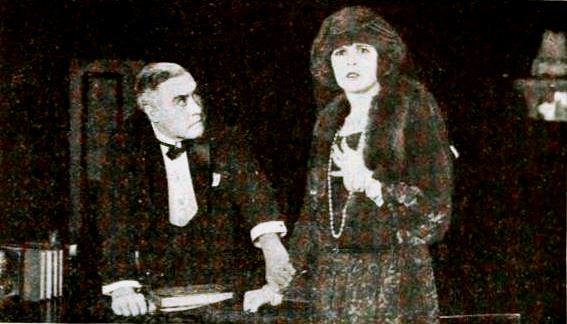
- Film still with Anita Stewart
- Directed by: Fred Niblo
- Written by: Herbert Bashford; Bess Meredyth
- Produced by: Louis B. Mayer; Anita Stewart
- Starring: Anita Stewart; Darrell Foss
- Cinematography: Dal Clawson
- Distributed by: Associated First National (*later First National)
- Release date: April 9, 1922
- Running time: 50 minutes
- Country: United States
- Language: Silent (English intertitles)

The Woman He Married is a 1922 American silent drama film directed by Fred Niblo. The film is considered to be lost.

== Plot ==
As reviewed in a film magazine, a rich man's son marries an artist's model, and is then disinherited by his father. Despite their circumstances, both the son and his model wife do well.

== Cast ==
- Anita Stewart as Natalie Lane
- Darrell Foss as Roderick Warren
- Donald MacDonald as Byrne Travers
- William Conklin as Andrew Warren
- Shannon Day as Mimi
- Charlotte Pierce as Muriel Warren
- Charles Belcher as Richard Steel
- Frank Tokunaga as Yosi (as Frank Tokawaja)
