= Colleen of the Pines =

1922 film

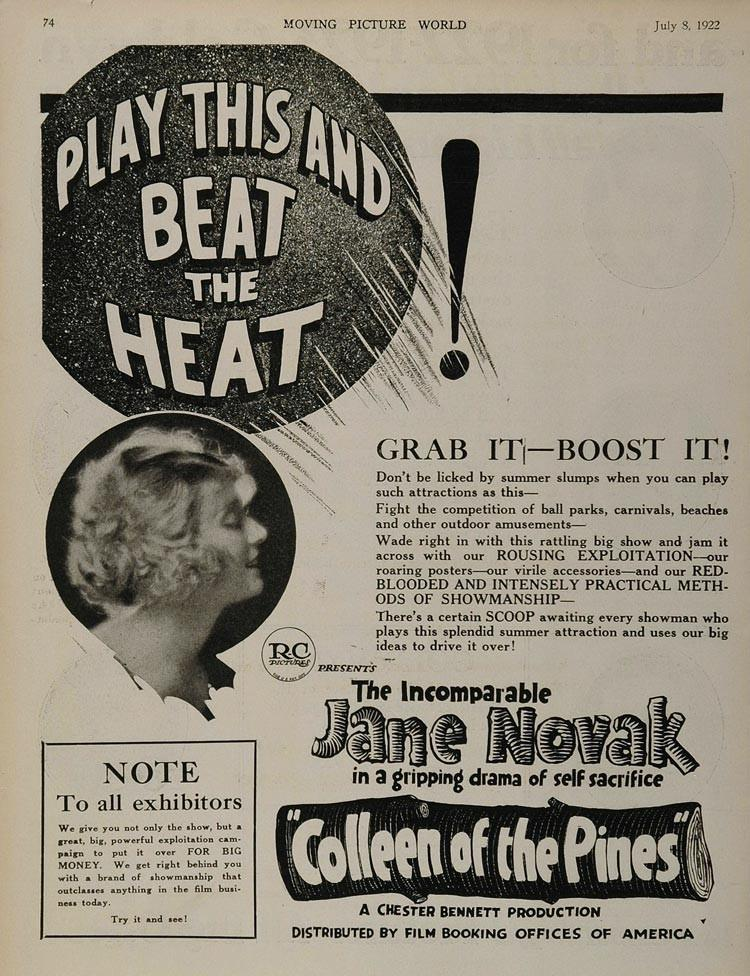
- Directed by: Chester Bennett
- Written by: J. Grubb Alexander
- Produced by: Chester Bennett
- Starring: Jane Novak; Edward Hearn; Alfred Allen
- Cinematography: Jack MacKenzie
- Production company: Chester Bennett Productions
- Distributed by: Film Booking Offices of America
- Release date: July 9, 1922
- Running time: 50 minutes
- Country: United States
- Languages: Silent; English intertitles

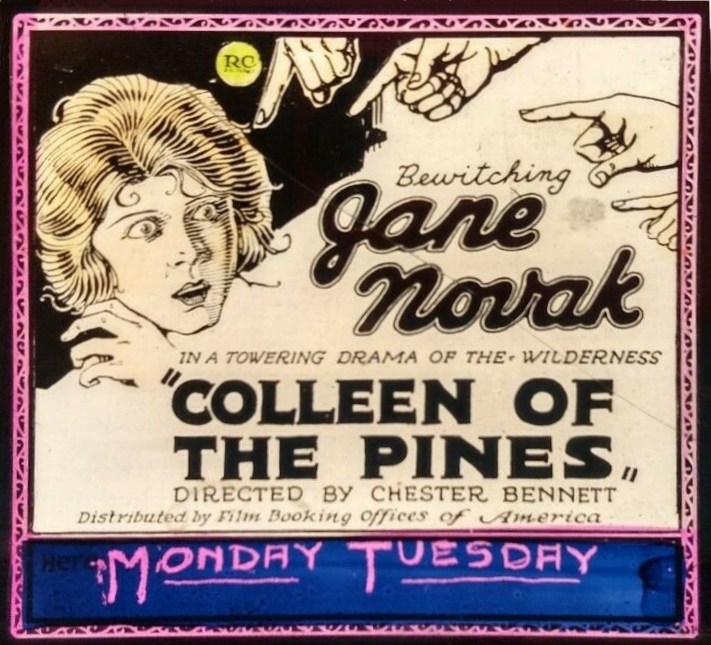
Colleen of the Pines (1922) lantern slide

Colleen of the Pines is a 1922 American silent Western film directed by Chester Bennett and starring Jane Novak, Edward Hearn and Alfred Allen.

== Cast ==
- Jane Novak as Joan Cameron
- Edward Hearn as Barry O'Neil
- Alfred Allen as Duncan Cameron
- J. Gordon Russell as Paul Bisson
- Charlotte Pierce as Esther Cameron
- Ernest Shields as Jules Perrault
- Bowditch M. Turner as Jerry-Jo

== Preservation ==
With no holdings located in archives, Colleen of the Pines is considered a lost film.
