= Wray Physioc =

American silent-film director (1890–1933)

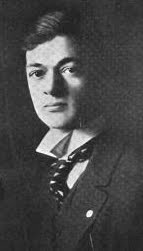
- from the Exhibitors' Times (1913)
- Born: Wray Bartlett Physioc; November 23, 1890; Columbia, South Carolina, US
- Died: May 8, 1933 (aged 42); Manhattan, New York, US
- Occupation: Film director

Wray Bartlett Physioc (November 23, 1890 – May 8, 1933) was an American film director, producer and artist. His film The Gulf Between (1917) was the first Technicolor film ever produced.

== Early years ==
Wray Physioc was born on November 23, 1890, in Columbia, South Carolina, to Joseph Physioc and Martha Johnson. His older brother was cinematographer Lewis Physioc. He graduated from McDonogh School in Baltimore, MD, in 1906.

== Career ==
Wray Physioc first entered the film industry when he acted in the 1911 short film The Wrong Bottle and was a charge scenic artist for the French film equipment and production company Pathé-Frères.

In January 1913, Physioc organized the Directors Film Corporation and Ramo Films, which was the brand name for films produced by the Directors Film Corporation. Ramo Films would release two short films per week: a comedy directed by Epes Winthrop Sargent, and a drama directed by Physioc. In March 1913, it was claimed that Physioc was the youngest director in the film industry at just 22 years of age. In a surprise move in July 1913, Physioc resigned as Ramo Films' Director of Productions and the next month he was Manager of Productions at General Film Company.

In 1914, he directed Hearts of Oak for the Mohawk Film Co. However, during production Physioc was on a schooner preparing for a scene when a premature explosion occurred forcing him to leap overboard and causing burns to his face and neck. By July 1915, he would be a director for Biograph Company and spent two years there.

In 1917, Physioc directed The Gulf Between, which was a critical and commercial failure but notable in that it was one of the first color films ever produced and the first to use Technicolor.

In 1919, he was directing a series of weekly shorts entitled Facts and Follies which were produced by Bernarr Macfadden for the Pioneer Film Corporation. In 1921, Physioc formed his own production company in New York: Wray Physioc Productions. In February 1922, it was announced that Physioc and the distribution company Wid Gunning, Inc. had come to an agreement to distribute four Wray Physioc Productions, beginning with The Madness of Love (1922). However, a fourth film was never released.

In the mid-1920s, Physioc spent a couple years in the West Indies directing films before returning to New York in March 1928.

Physioc died on May 8, 1933, in Manhattan, New York.

== Personal life ==
Wray Physioc was married to actress Mary Alden. By the early 1920s, Wray Physioc lived and worked in New York City.

== Selected filmography ==
As director

- Hearts of Oak (1914)
- The Shadow of a Doubt (1916)
- The Gulf Between (1917)
- Human Clay (1918)
- The Madness of Love (1922)
- The Blonde Vampire (1922)
- The Love Nest (1922)
