= Charles Ray (actor) =

American actor, director, producer and screenwriter (1891–1943)

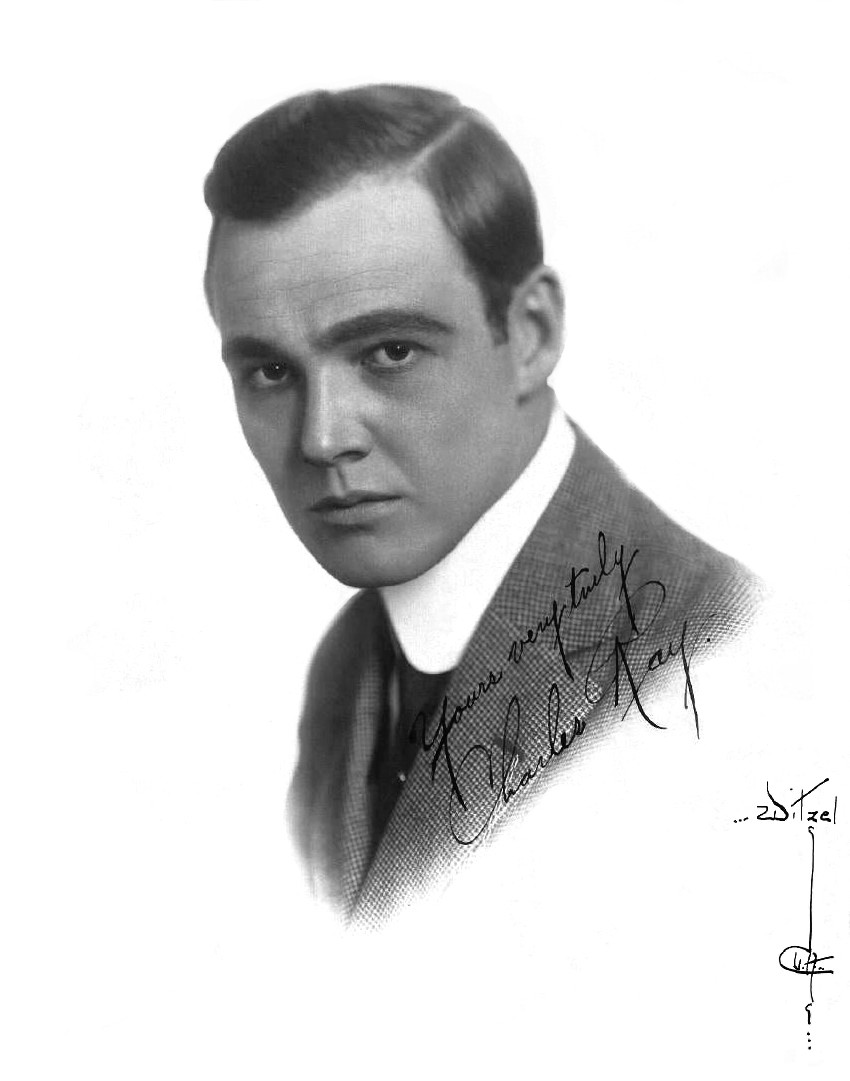
- Born: March 15, 1891; Jacksonville, Illinois, U.S.
- Died: November 23, 1943 (aged 52); Los Angeles, California, U.S.
- Resting place: Forest Lawn Memorial Park, Glendale
- Occupations: Actor; director; producer; screenwriter
- Years active: 1911–1943
- Spouses: Clara Grant (m. 1915; div. 1935) Yvonne Guerin (m. 1941; died 1942)

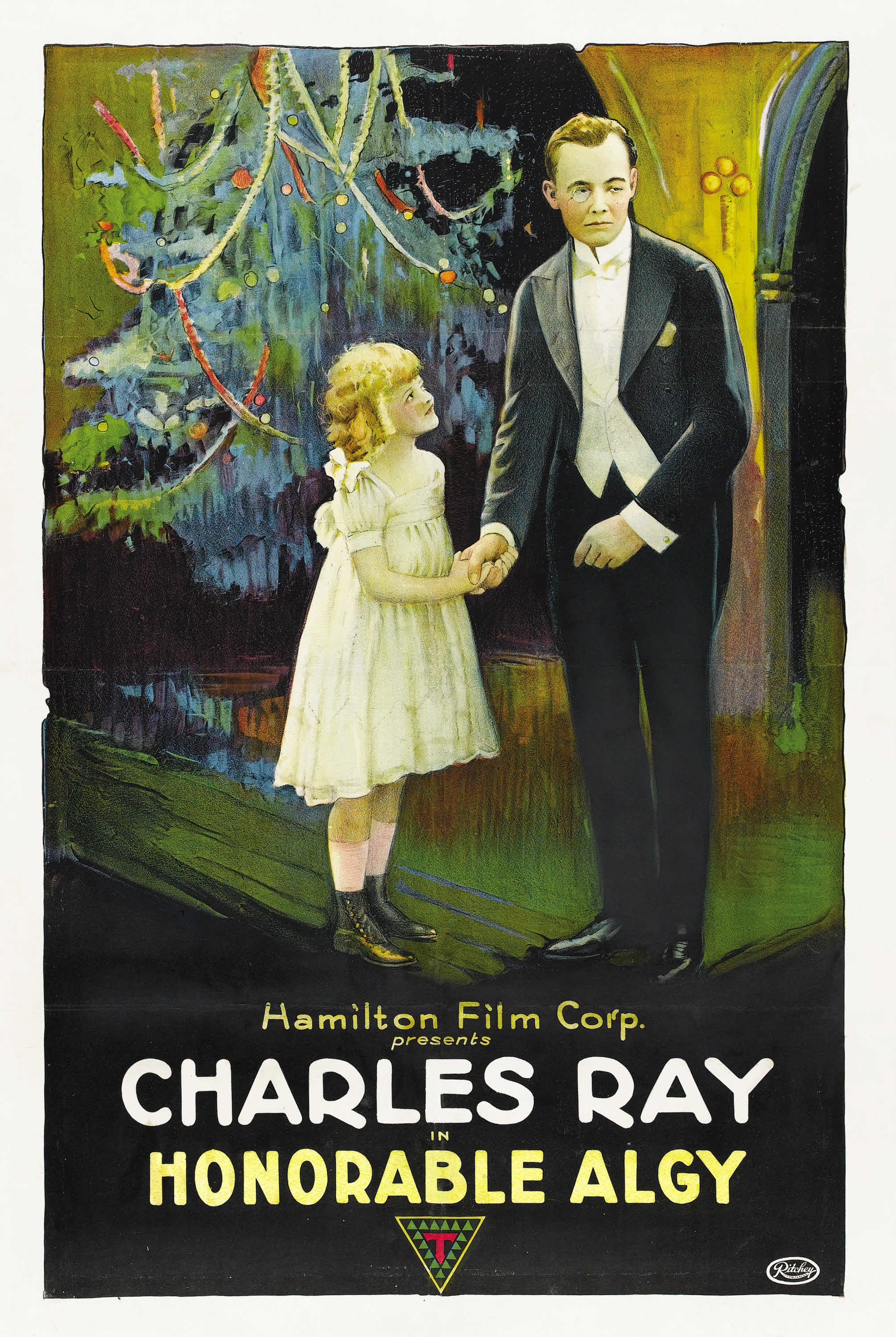
Movie poster for the now lost The Honorable Algy (1916)

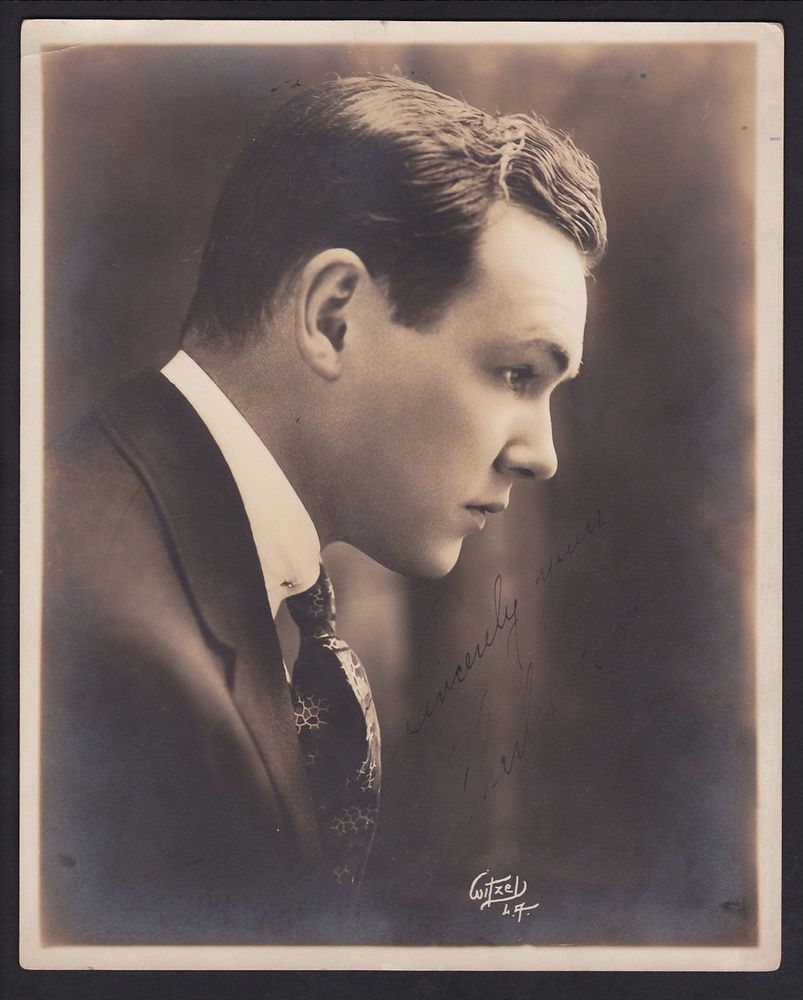
Ray, c.1918

Charles Edgar Ray (March 15, 1891 – November 23, 1943) was an American actor, director, producer, and screenwriter. Ray rose to fame during the mid-1910s portraying young, wholesome hicks in silent comedy films.

== Early life ==
Ray was born in Jacksonville, Illinois, and moved to Springfield as a child where he attended elementary school. He then moved to Needles, California, for a time before finally relocating to Los Angeles where he finished his education. He began his career on the stage before working for director Thomas H. Ince as a film extra in silent shorts in December 1912. He appeared in several bit parts before moving on to supporting roles. Ray's breakthrough role came in 1915 when he co-starred opposite Frank Keenan in one of his first full-length feature, the historical American Civil War drama The Coward. The film was a box office success and critics praised Ray's mannerisms and natural acting style.

== Career ==
Ray's popularity grew after appearing in a series of light silent comedy features which cast him in juvenile roles, primarily young, wholesome hicks or naive, unsophisticated "country bumpkins" that foiled the plans of thieves or con men and won the heart of his dream girl. In March 1917, he signed with Paramount Pictures and resumed working with director Thomas H. Ince. By 1920, Ray enjoyed critical and commercial success and was earning a reported $11,000 a week (approximately $177,000 today). As Ray's public popularity continued, he had gained a reputation in Hollywood for being difficult and egomaniacal. In 1920, he abruptly left Paramount after studio head Adolph Zukor refused to give him a substantial pay raise. Zukor later wrote in his autobiography, The Public Is Never Wrong, that Ray's ego and behavior had become problematic and that Ray "... was headed for trouble and [I] did not care to be with him when he found it." Ray soon formed his own production company, Charles Ray Productions, and used his fortune to purchase a studio on Sunset Boulevard in Los Angeles (now known as the KCET Studios) where he planned to produce and shoot his own films.

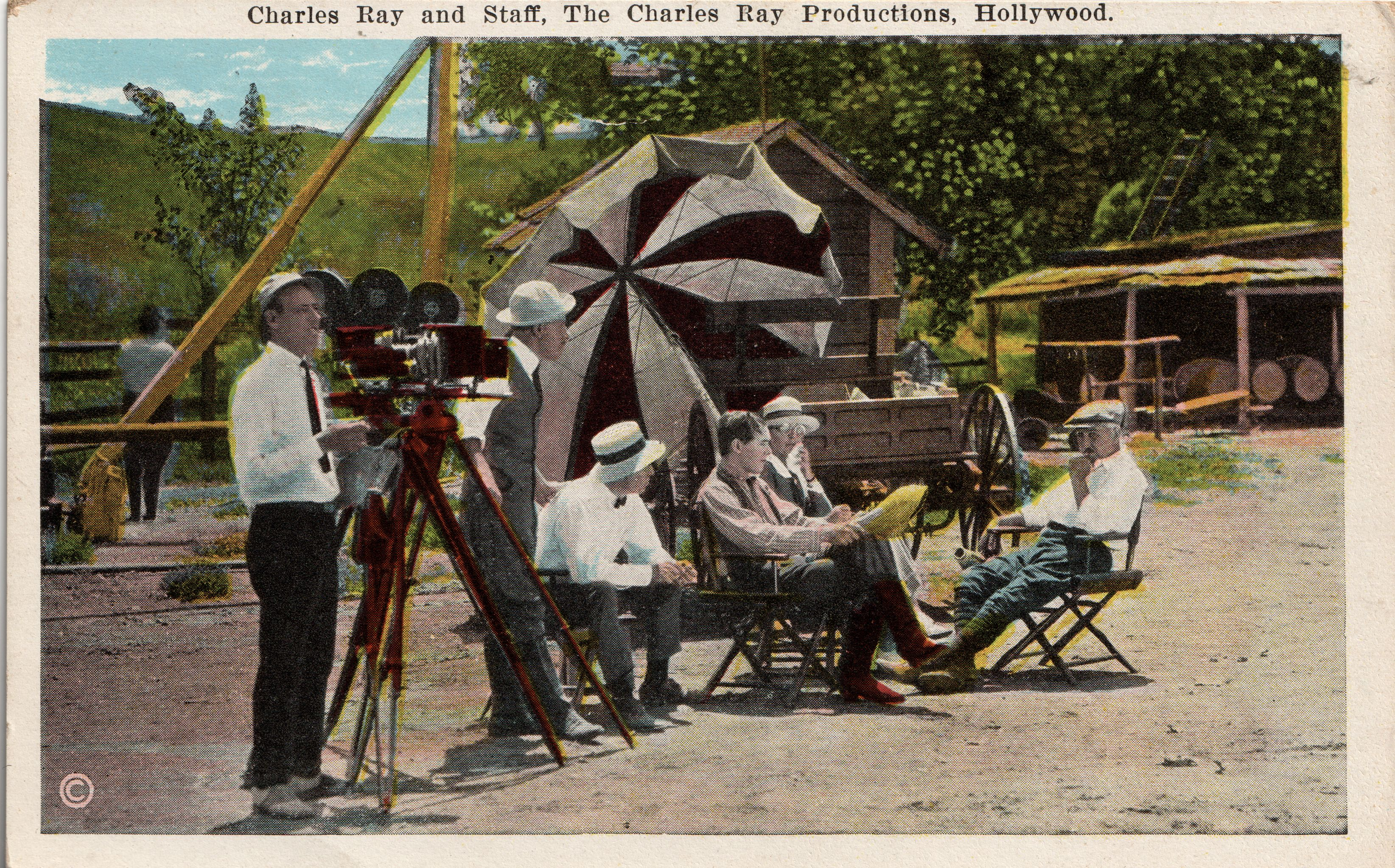
Charles Ray and staff making a film, circa 1920s

Ray's first independent production, 45 Minutes from Broadway, was released in August 1920 and was fairly successful but not as successful as his previous films. In February 1921, he produced and starred in The Old Swimmin' Hole, the first full-length, American silent film that did not have intertitles to further the plot. The film drew critical acclaim for going against convention and for featuring a simple plot that was easy to follow without intertitles. Critics also praised Ray's ability to act convincingly despite a lack of intertitles. Despite the critical acclaim, the film was only shown for a short time in theaters in larger cities (where more sophisticated, big city audiences were more likely to accept experimental films and concepts) because the film featured Ray in a country bumpkin role. In February 1922, he signed a long-term contract with United Artists.

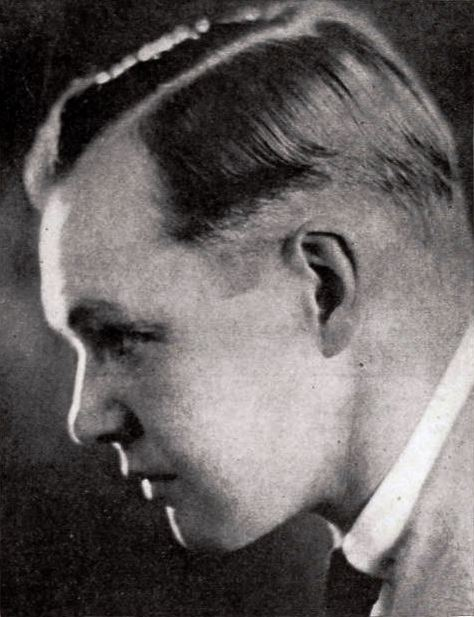
Charles Ray in 1922

By the time Ray signed with United Artists, he had grown tired of playing country bumpkin and juvenile characters in comedy films. In an effort to change his image to that of a romantic leading man, Ray chose to produce an epic historical drama film based on The Courtship of Miles Standish, an 1858 narrative poem by Henry Wadsworth Longfellow. The poem centers around a love triangle between early American settlers John Alden, Miles Standish, and Priscilla Mullens. In November 1922, Ray announced that he would portray the lead role of John Alden in the film. He stated, "There will be immense satisfaction to me in playing a real character, not the puppet of some author's invention."

In her book Off With Their Heads!: A Serio-Comic Tale Of Hollywood, screenwriter Frances Marion wrote that numerous people attempted to dissuade Ray from making the film because lengthy costume dramas were not box office draws at the time. Ray chose not to listen to the advice and, after failing to secure financial backing from a major studio, he put up $500,000 (approximately $9,448,000 today) of his own money to finance the film. Ray began filming The Courtship of Miles Standish in January 1923 at his namesake studio on Sunset Boulevard. Production costs quickly rose as Ray spent money with abandon. In addition to the $65,000 (approximately $1,228,000 today) 180-ton replica of the Mayflower that was set on a mechanism to simulate it being on rough seas, Ray also had full sized log cabins built solely for exterior shots. By the end of filming, Ray had invested all of his savings, nearly $2 million (approximately $37,793,000 today), and borrowed additional funds at a 30% interest rate to finish the film. The film's final budget was estimated at $3 million (approximately $56,689,000 today).

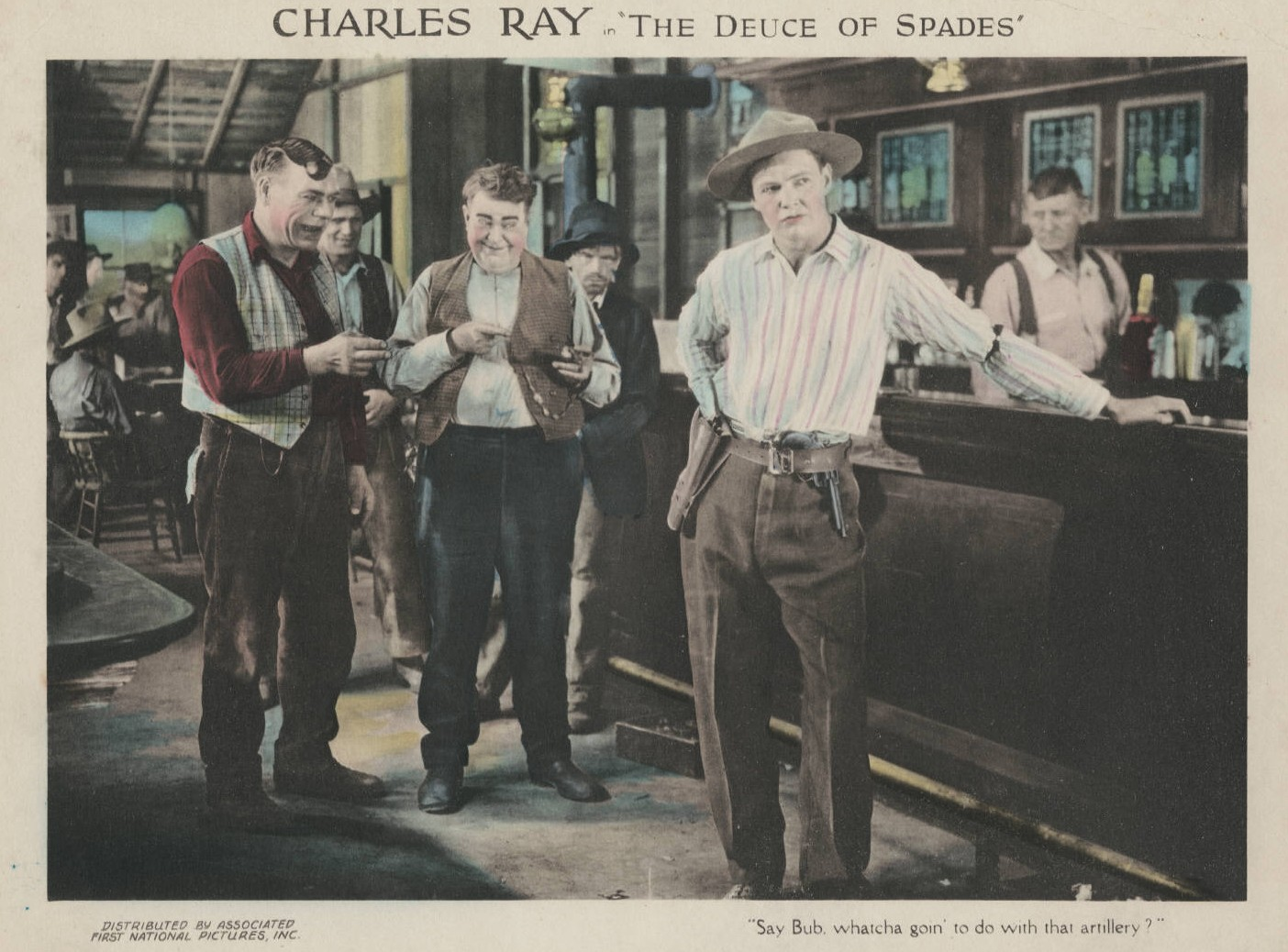
Charles Ray in The Deuce of Spades lobby card, 1922

Released to theaters on December 30, 1923, The Courtship of Miles Standish received some critical acclaim, mainly for its cinematography, but received generally lukewarm reviews and was a box office failure. Ray lost all of the money he invested in the film and, due to the film's box office failure, his popularity quickly declined. Thomas Ince, who had worked with Ray early in his career, attempted to help Ray by casting him in the drama Dynamite Smith (1924), directed by Ince's brother Ralph. The film did little to help boost Ray's popularity. While he continued working in films until the 1940s, Ray never regained the popularity he once attained. For the remainder of his career, he was relegated to small supporting and uncredited extra work.

=== Decline and later years ===
In December 1925, Ray was forced to file for bankruptcy after being sued by more than a dozen creditors for monies owed and back taxes. His production company also declared bankruptcy. Actress Jane Novak later recalled that Ray's wife Clara Grant (whom he married in November 1915) contributed to Ray's egomania and spendthrift ways. The couple lived in a lavish Beverly Hills home equipped with gold doorknobs, several lacquered pianos, black marble bathtubs with gold fixtures and a full sized tree made of semi-precious stones that sat in their bathroom. They employed a full staff of servants and owned a fleet of luxury cars. Grant bought expensive dresses that she refused to wear more than once and traveled in a Rolls-Royce with an ermine floor rug. The day before Ray was to file for bankruptcy, the couple held a dinner party with a personal butler for each of their guests at their home that reportedly cost $30,000. Film executive Pat Powers attended the party and asked Ray, "... how can you do this if you're going bankrupt tomorrow? Who will pay the bills? And he [Ray] said, 'we thought it was the thing to do.'"

In 1928, Ray appeared in his final silent film, The Count of Ten, in which he had a supporting role. From 1929 to 1931, he appeared in stage roles in off-Broadway productions but found little success. He returned to the screen in 1932's The Bride's Bereavement; or, The Snake in the Grass, a comedy short and his first sound film. In July 1934, Ray filed for bankruptcy for a second time. He and wife Clara Grant, from whom he had been separated since 1930, divorced in May 1935.

In an attempt to earn money and revive his career, Ray began writing. In 1935, he released a collection of short stories entitled Hollywood Shorts. In September 1936, he began publishing a magazine called Charles Ray's Hollywood Digest. The magazine featured a mixture of humorous stories and jokes, film reviews and industry news and editorials and articles written by actors and directors including Melvyn Douglas, Groucho Marx and Cecil B. DeMille. In the magazine's first issue, Ray wrote a story which poked fun at then popular and influential gossip columnist Walter Winchell entitled “Is Winchell a Heel?” (“Heel” being slang for a contemptible person). The magazine folded in 1937 after just two issues due to a lack of public interest.

Ray returned to film work again where he earned a reported $11 a day as a featured extra. On June 4, 1941, he married for a second time to French actress Yvonne Guerin. Guerin died the following year. During his final years, Ray struggled with poor health but continued to work in bit roles. He ended his career in uncredited bit roles in Slightly Dangerous (1943) and An American Romance, which was released a year after his death.

== Death ==
On November 23, 1943, Ray died at Cedars of Lebanon Hospital in Los Angeles of a systemic infection caused by an impacted wisdom tooth, for which he had been hospitalized six weeks prior. He is buried at Forest Lawn Memorial Park in an unmarked grave in Glendale, California.

For his contribution to the motion picture industry, Charles Ray received a star on the Hollywood Walk of Fame on February 8, 1960, located at 6355 Hollywood Boulevard.

== Filmography ==
Short subjects
Year	Title	Role	Notes
1911	The Fortunes of War	Letty Roberts	Lost film
1913	The Favorite Son	Jim King	Short
1913	The Sharpshooter	Jack Krone - a Young Blacksmith	Short
1913	The Barrier	Wade - the Young Lieutenant	Short
1913	The Witch of Salem	John Hastings	Short
1914	For Her Brother's Sake	John Frye - the Brother	Short
1914	Shorty's Sacrifice	Tom Simms	Short
1914	The Curse of Humanity	Roger	Short
1914	The Fortunes of War	Carlos Romez	Short
1915	In the Tennessee Hills	Jim Carson	Short
1915	The Wells of Paradise	Tom Dolan	Short
1915	The Conversion of Frosty Blake	Reverend Horace Brightray	Short
1915	The Ace of Hearts	Jean Desmond	Short, Credited as Charles E. Ray
1918	A Liberty Bond Plea	A farm boy	Short
1932	The Bride's Bereavement; or, The Snake in the Grass		Short
1934	Stolen by Gypsies or Beer and Bicycles	Elmer Updike	Short, Alternative title: Beer and Bicycles

Features
Year	Title	Role	Notes
1915	The Cup of Life	John Ward	
1915	The Coward	Frank Winslow	
1915	City of the Dead	Cecil Weatherby	Alternative title: The Forbidden Adventure
1915	The Painted Soul	Barnard	Alternative title: The Straight Road
1916	Peggy	Colin Cameron	
1916	The Deserter	Lieutenant Parker	
1916	The Honorable Algy	The Honorable Algy	Lost film
1917	The Millionaire Vagrant	Steven Du Peyster	
1917	The Pinch Hitter	Joel Parker	
1917	The Clodhopper	Everett Nelson	
1917	His Mother's Boy	Matthew Denton	
1918	The Claws of the Hun	John Stanton	
1918	The Law of the North	Alain de Montcalm	
1918	String Beans	Toby Watkins	
1919	The Busher	Ben Harding	
1919	Hay Foot, Straw Foot	Ulysses S. Grant Briggs	
1919	Bill Henry	Bill Henry Jenkins	
1919	Red Hot Dollars	Tod Burke	
1920	Alarm Clock Andy	Andrew Gray	
1920	The Village Sleuth	William Wells	
1920	45 Minutes from Broadway	Kid Burns	
1920	An Old Fashioned Boy	David Warrington	Director, producer
1921	The Old Swimmin' Hole	Ezra	Producer
1921	Scrap Iron	John Steel	Director, writer
1921	A Midnight Bell	Martin Tripp	Lost film
1921	Two Minutes to Go	Chester Burnett	Director, producer Lost film
1921	R.S.V.P.	Richard Morgan	Director
1922	The Barnstormer	Joel	Director; Lost film
1922	Gas, Oil and Water	George Oliver Watson	Director, producer
1922	Alias Julius Caesar	Billy Barnes	Director, producer
1922	Robin Hood	Extra	Uncredited
1923	The Girl I Loved	John Middleton	Producer
1923	Ponjola		
1923	The Courtship of Miles Standish	John Alden	Producer; Lost film
1924	Dynamite Smith	Dynamite Smith	
1925	Percy	Percival Rogeen	
1925	Some Pun'kins	Lem Blossom	
1925	Bright Lights	Tom Corbin	
1926	The Auction Block	Bob Wharton	
1926	Paris	Jerry	
1926	The Fire Brigade	Terry O'Neil	
1927	The American		Unreleased film
1927	Getting Gertie's Garter	Ken Walrick	
1927	Vanity	Lt. Lloyd Van Courtland	
1928	The Garden of Eden	Richard Dupont	
1928	The Count of Ten	Johnny McKinney	
1934	School for Girls	Duke	
1934	Ladies Should Listen	Henri, the porter	
1934	Ticket to a Crime	Courtney Mallory	
1935	Welcome Home	Andrew Carr	
1935	Just My Luck	Homer Crow	
1936	Hollywood Boulevard	Charlie Smith, Assistant Director	
1940	A Little Bit of Heaven	Uncle Wes	
1941	Wild Geese Calling	Undetermined Minor Role	Uncredited
1941	A Yank in the R.A.F.	American business executive	Uncredited
1941	Married Bachelor	Man in Lounge Room Getting Bagpipes	Uncredited
1941	Appointment for Love	Butler	Uncredited
1941	Harvard, Here I Come!	Reporter	Uncredited
1942	Rio Rita	Hotel Guest	Uncredited
1942	Mrs. Miniver	Man getting on Bus	Uncredited
1942	The Magnificent Dope		Uncredited
1942	Tennessee Johnson	Senator	Uncredited
1943	Slightly Dangerous	Opera Patron	Uncredited
1944	An American Romance	Extra	Uncredited; Released posthumously
