= The Veiled Woman (1922 film) =

1922 silent film

- Directed by: Lloyd Ingraham
- Written by: David Kirkland
- Produced by: H.J. Reynolds
- Starring: Marguerite Snow; Edward Coxen; Landers Stevens
- Cinematography: Ross Fisher
- Production company: Renco Film Company
- Distributed by: Hodkinson Pictures
- Release date: September 3, 1922
- Running time: 60 minutes
- Country: United States
- Languages: Silent; English intertitles

The Veiled Woman is a 1922 American silent drama film directed by Lloyd Ingraham and starring Marguerite Snow, Edward Coxen and Landers Stevens.

== Cast ==
- Marguerite Snow as Elvina Grey
- Edward Coxen as The Piper
- Landers Stevens as The Doctor
- Lottie Williams as Aunt Hitty
- Ralph McCullough as The Doctor's Son
- Charlotte Pierce as Araminta Lee

== Bibliography ==
- Munden, Kenneth White. The American Film Institute Catalog of Motion Pictures Produced in the United States, Part 1. University of California Press, 1997.
