= Daisey =

Family name

- Pronunciation: /ˈdeɪzi/
- Languages: English, French

Origin
- Meaning: d'Aisie (of Aisie)
- Region of origin: United States

Other names
- Variant forms: Dazey, Dasey, Daisy

Daisey is an American surname. The surname dates back to the 17th century to an area now known as the Baltimore Hundred. The anglicization of the surname occurred during the 19th century. The origin of the surname is most likely from the ancient barony of Aisie (d'Aisie) in the arrondissement of Pont Audemer in Normandy—now written Aizier.

Notable individuals with the name include:

- Mitchell Dazey, American politician and farmer
- Charles Dazey, American writer and playwright
- Frank Dazey, American screenwriter
- Nannita Daisey, American teacher and feminist
- George Daisey, American Major League Baseball player
- Delbert Daisey, American waterfowl woodcarver and decoy maker
- Mike Daisey, American monologist, author, and actor
