= Manhattan Madness =

Manhattan Madness may refer to:

- Manhattan Madness (1916 film), a silent American film directed by Allan Dwan
- Manhattan Madness (1925 film), a silent American film directed by John McDermott
