= Manhattan Madness (1925 film) =

1925 film

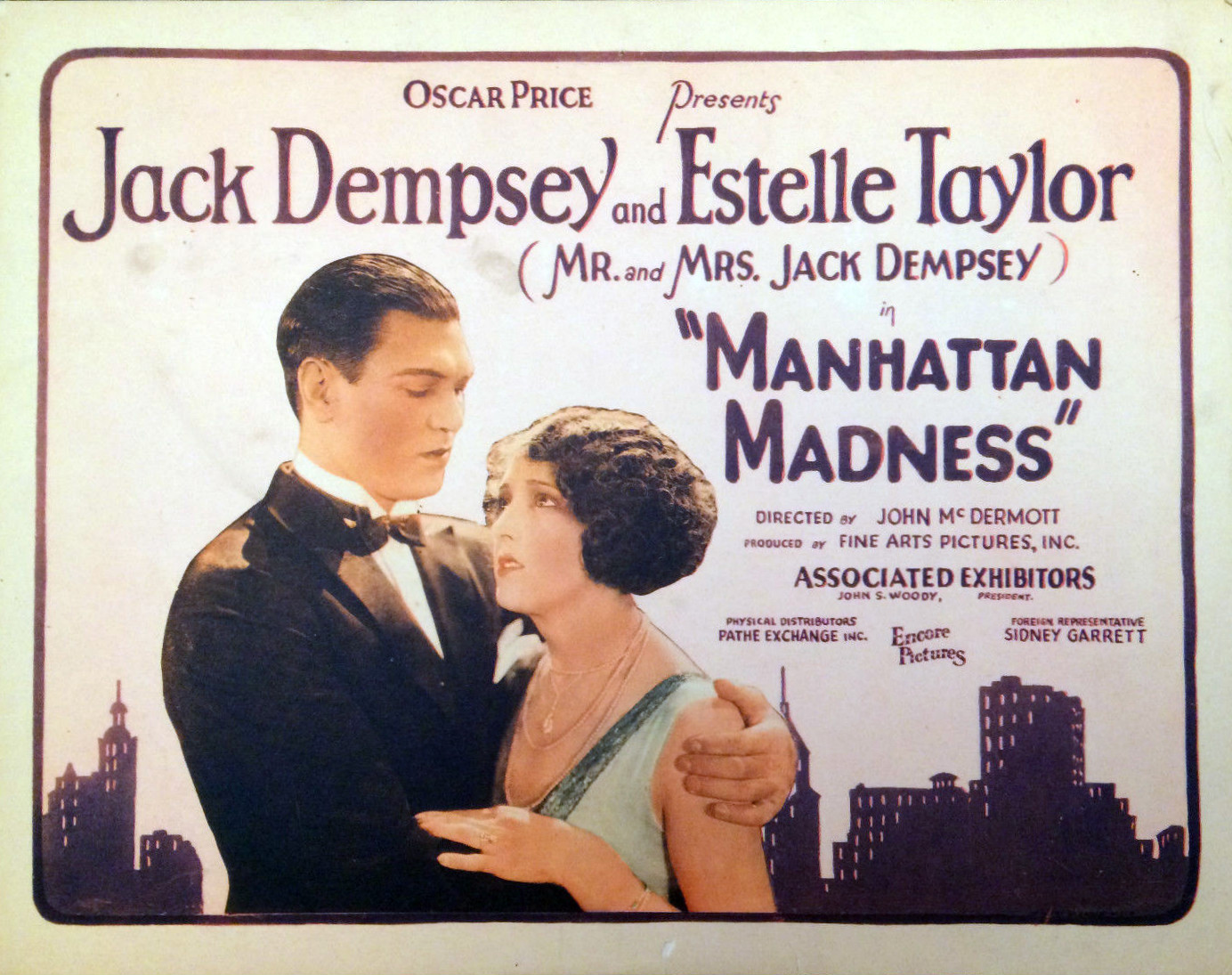
- Lobby card
- Directed by: John McDermott
- Written by: Frank Dazey; Charles T. Dazey
- Based on: story by E.V. Durling
- Produced by: Oscar Price
- Starring: Estelle Taylor; Jack Dempsey
- Cinematography: Jules Cronjager
- Production company: Fine Arts Pictures
- Distributed by: Associated Exhibitors
- Release date: September 20, 1925
- Running time: 6 reels
- Country: United States
- Language: Silent (English intertitles)

Manhattan Madness is a 1925 American silent drama film directed by John McDermott and starring Jack Dempsey and Estelle Taylor, a then real life husband and wife duo. It was produced by Fine Arts Pictures and distributed through Associated Exhibitors. This film is a remake of Douglas Fairbanks's 1916 film Manhattan Madness.

== Plot ==
As described in a film magazine reviews, young Westerner Steve O’Dare comes to New York City in search of thrills but finds it very dull. A host of his friends decide to whoop things up a bit. An attractive young woman (Taylor) to whom Steve has been introduced has been suddenly kidnapped and sends him an S.O.S. from a house on Long Island. In good faith, Steve rushes to the rescue. The Long Island place appears to be possessed or the habitat of an evil gang determined to exterminate him by any means possible. Mysterious happenings occur in the house such as sliding walls, trap doors, dungeons, and what not. Steve gets busy and tackles them one at a time or altogether, and finally rescues the fair damsel, only to find that it was all a joke. Steve’s ire is aroused and he kidnaps the young woman and makes her his wife.

== Cast ==
- Jack Dempsey as Steve O'Dare
- Estelle Taylor as The Girl
- George Siegmann as Dr. Harlan
- Frank Campeau as The Butler
- Bull Montana as The Chauffeur
- Nelson McDowell as Hank
- Billy Franey as Zeke
- Theodore Lorch as Count Von Eckmann
- Jane Starr as The Maid
- Robert Graves as Jack Russell
- Tom Wilson as Porter
- Christian J. Frank as 'Dutch' Herman
- Glen Cavender as 'Broken Nose' Murphy
- Harry Tenbrook as 'Lefty' Lewis

== Production ==
Oscar Price, of Associated Exhibitors, made plans to remake 1916's Manhattan Madness in early 1925 and served as its producer. Jack Dempsey was unable to participate in any boxing matches as stipulated by his contract for the film. It was initially claimed that the Dempseys were paid $250,000, but it was denied by Jack's manager Jack Kearns. Filming started on March 23, 1925, and ended in April.

== Reception ==
Roberta Nangle, writing in Chicago Daily Tribune, criticized the film as "old stuff" and "an incoherent jumble of fist fights, kidnapings, shootings, and similar rough stuff capped by a romantic but rather silly climax". Laurence Reid of Motion Picture News stated that "it is a hokum picture which is built entirely on the premise of surprise" and "It is well done allowing for some colorless comedy relief expressed by a pair of eccentric cowpuncher - and some repetitious incident leading up to the climax." Allene Talmey described it as "undoubtedly one of the worst films ever produced".

== Preservation ==
The film is preserved at the Library of Congress and George Eastman House Motion Picture Collection.

== Works cited ==
- Reid, Laurence (1925). "Manhattan Madness". Motion Picture News.
