= Love's Harvest =

1920 silent film

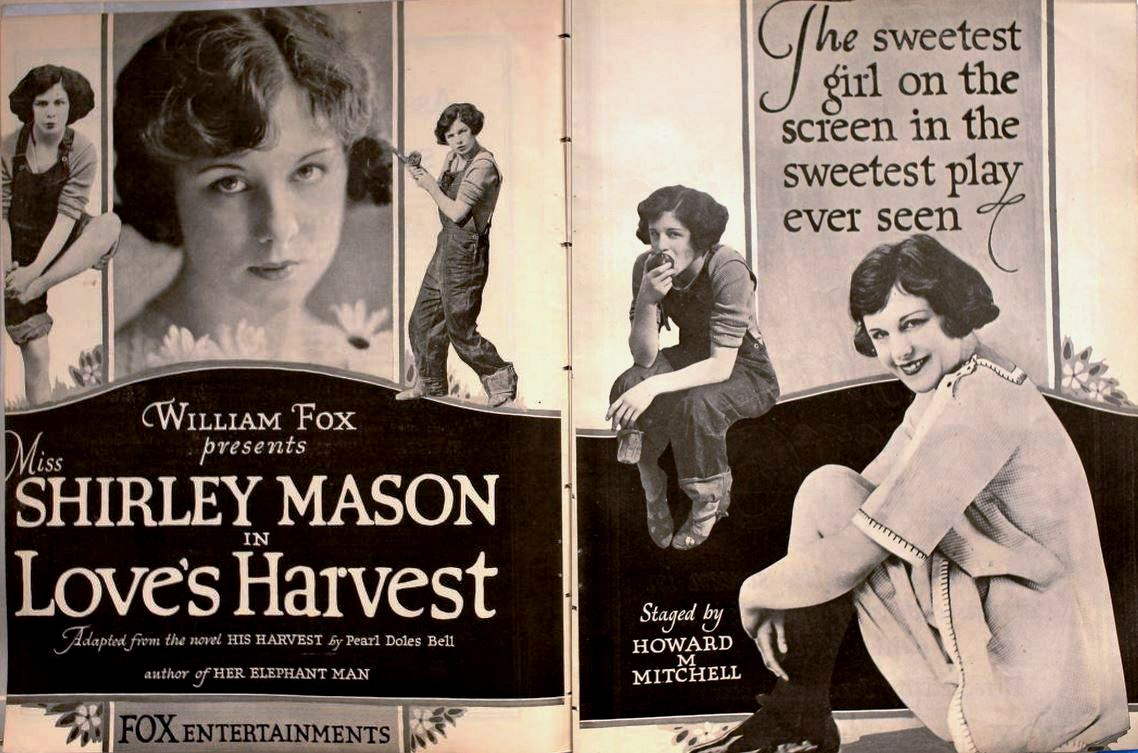
- Directed by: Howard M. Mitchell
- Written by: Pearl Doles Bell (novel); Isabel Johnston
- Produced by: William Fox
- Starring: Shirley Mason; Raymond McKee; Edwin B. Tilton
- Cinematography: George Schneiderman
- Production company: Fox Film
- Distributed by: Fox Film
- Release date: June 5, 1920
- Running time: 50 minutes
- Country: United States
- Languages: Silent; English intertitles

Love's Harvest is a 1920 American silent drama film directed by Howard M. Mitchell and starring Shirley Mason, Raymond McKee and Edwin B. Tilton.

== Cast ==
- Shirley Mason as Jane Day
- Raymond McKee as Jim Atherton
- Edwin B. Tilton as Allen Hamilton
- Lila Leslie as Eleanor Hamilton

== Bibliography ==
- Solomon, Aubrey. The Fox Film Corporation, 1915-1935: A History and Filmography. McFarland, 2011.
