= For Another Woman =

1924 film directed by David Kirkland

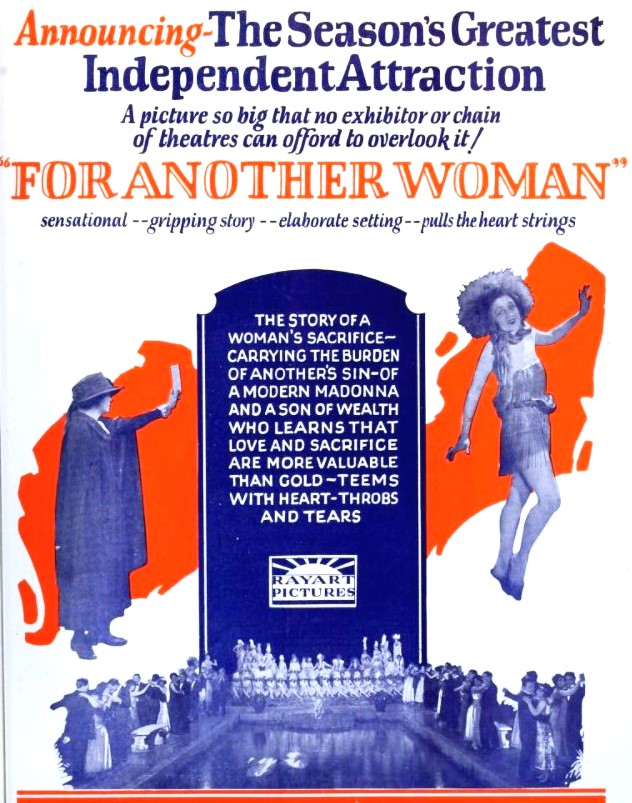
- Advertisement
- Directed by: David Kirkland
- Written by: Frank Mitchell Dazey; Agnes Christine Johnston
- Based on: "Just Mary" by Pearl Doles Bell
- Produced by: W. Ray Johnston
- Starring: Kenneth Harlan; Florence Billings; Tyrone Power Sr.
- Cinematography: Horace G. Plympton
- Production company: Rayart Pictures
- Distributed by: Rayart Pictures
- Release date: November 1, 1924
- Running time: 60 minutes
- Country: United States
- Language: Silent (English intertitles)

For Another Woman is a 1924 American silent drama film directed by David Kirkland and starring Kenneth Harlan, Florence Billings, and Tyrone Power Sr.

== Synopsis ==
A New York City wastrel inherits an estate in Canada.

== Cast ==
- Kenneth Harlan
- Florence Billings
- Henry Sedley
- Mary Thurman
- Kathryn Riddell
- Arnold Daly
- Alan Hale
- Tyrone Power Sr.

== Preservation ==
A copy of For Another Woman is located in the BFI National Archive.

== Bibliography ==
- Munden, Kenneth White. The American Film Institute Catalog of Motion Pictures Produced in the United States, Part 1. University of California Press, 1997.
