= The Butterfly Man =

1920 film

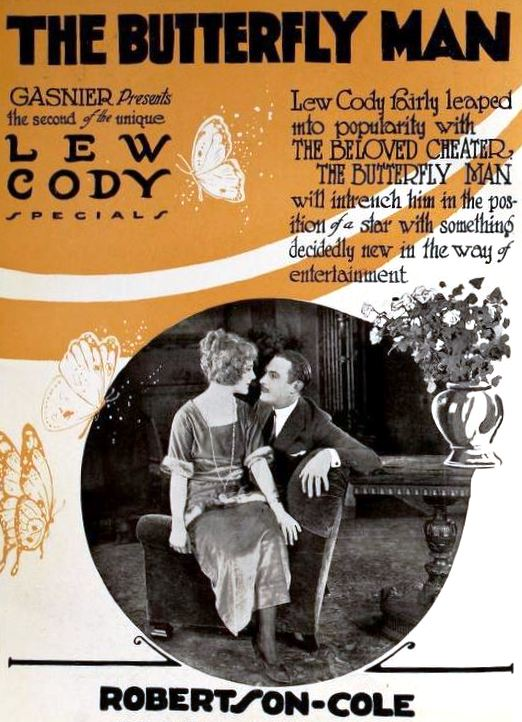
- Directed by: Ida May Park
- Written by: George Barr McCutcheon (novel); Ida May Park
- Produced by: Louis J. Gasnier
- Starring: Lew Cody; Louise Lovely; Lila Leslie
- Cinematography: Joseph A. Dubray
- Production company: Louis J. Gasnier Productions
- Distributed by: Robertson-Cole Distributing Corporation
- Release date: 18 April 1920
- Running time: 60 minutes
- Country: United States
- Languages: Silent; English intertitles

The Butterfly Man is a 1920 American silent drama film directed by Ida May Park, starring Lew Cody, Louise Lovely, and Lila Leslie, and produced by Louis J. Gasnier.

== Cast ==
- Lew Cody as Sedgewick Blynn
- Louise Lovely as Bessie Morgan
- Lila Leslie as Mrs. Trend
- Rosemary Theby as Mrs. Fielding
- Martha Mattox as Anna Blynn
- Mary Land as Martha Blynn
- Alberta Lee as Mrs. Blynn
- Augustus Phillips as Mr. Trend
- Alec B. Francis as James Bachelor
- Andrew Robson as John D. Morgan
- Esther Ralston

== Preservation ==
The film is lost.

== Bibliography ==
- Jeff Codori. Film History through Trade Journal Art, 1916–1920. Jeferson, NC: McFarland, 2020.
- Connelly, Robert B. The Silents: Silent Feature Films, 1910-36, Volume 40, Issue 2. December Press, 1998.
- Munden, Kenneth White. The American Film Institute Catalog of Motion Pictures Produced in the United States, Part 1. University of California Press, 1997.
