= Her Temporary Husband =

1923 film

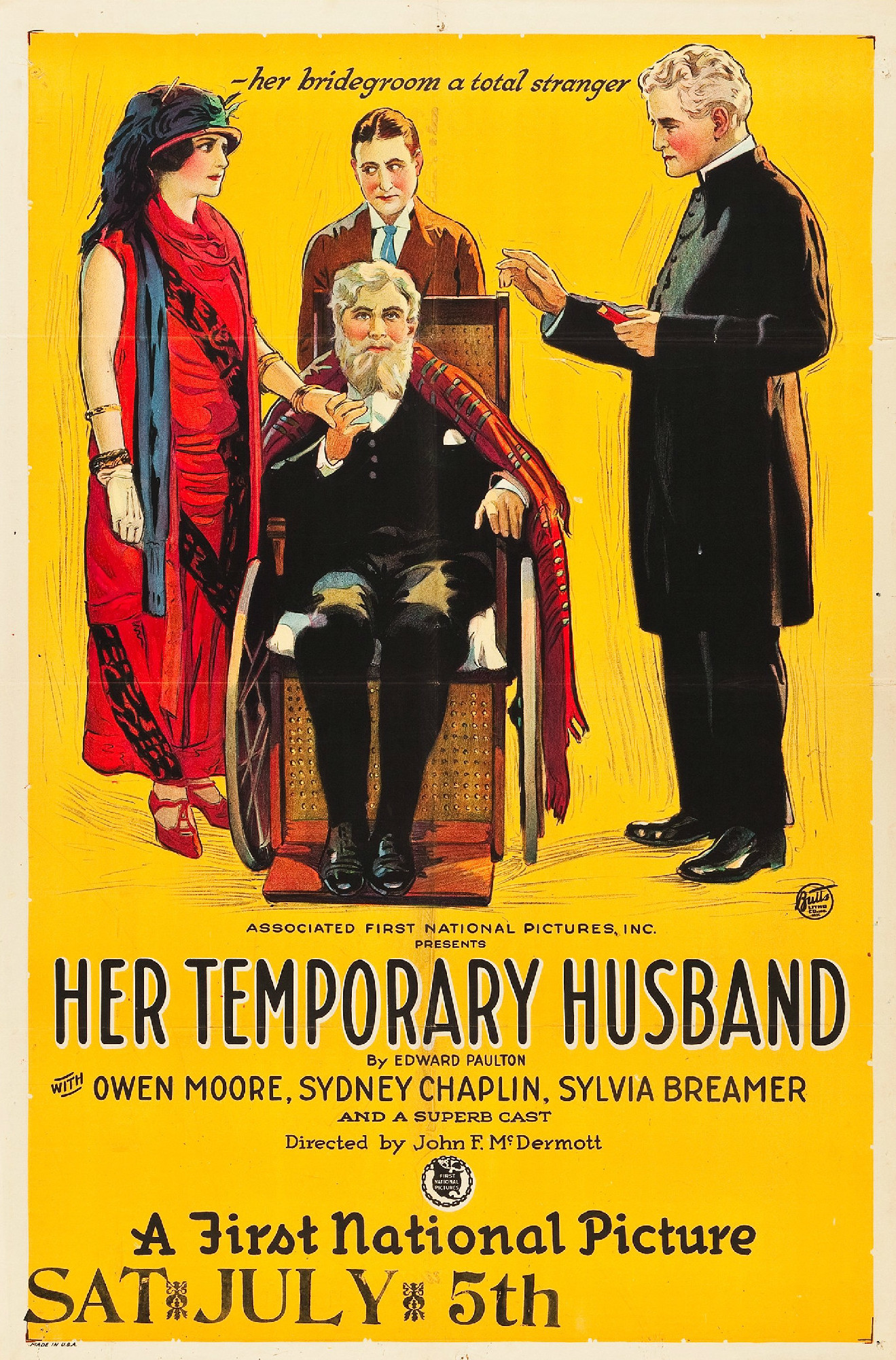
- Theatrical release poster
- Directed by: John McDermott
- Written by: F. McGrew Willis
- Based on: Her Temporary Husband by Edward A. Paulton
- Starring: Owen Moore; Syd Chaplin; Sylvia Breamer
- Cinematography: Sam Landers
- Distributed by: First National Pictures
- Release date: December 23, 1923
- Running time: 70 minutes
- Country: United States
- Language: Silent (English intertitles)

Her Temporary Husband is a 1923 American silent comedy film directed by John McDermott and starring Owen Moore. Based upon a play of the same name by Edward A. Paulton, it was produced and distributed by Associated First National (later First National Pictures).

== Plot ==
As described in a film magazine review, Blanche Ingram must marry within twenty four hours or she will lose a fortune. She arranges to marry John Ingram, an old man she believes will not live long. Wealthy Thomas Burton, who is in love with Blanche, disguises himself as the elderly invalid and goes through the marriage ceremony. The real old man's secretary, with the aid of underworld thugs, plans to kill Burton. Burton's valet Judd disguises himself as his master and sends out a radio call for help to the army, navy, police, Elks, and other organizations. They all respond and the gang is captured. Burton is accepted as a permanent rather than temporary husband by Blanche.

== Cast ==
- Owen Moore as Thomas Burton
- Syd Chaplin as Judd
- Sylvia Breamer as Blanche Ingram
- Tully Marshall as John Ingram
- Charles K. Gerrard as Clarence Topping
- George Cooper as Conrad Jasper
- Charles Reisner as Hector (credited as Chuck Reisner)
- John Patrick as Larry
- Craig Biddle Jr.

== Preservation ==
With no prints of Her Temporary Husband located in any film archives, it is a lost film.
