= Frank Mitchell Dazey =

American screenwriter

- Born: April 30, 1892; Quincy, Illinois
- Died: June 16, 1970 (aged 78)
- Occupation: Screenwriter
- Years active: 1914-1954
- Spouse: Agnes Christine Johnston

Frank Mitchell Dazey (April 30, 1892 – June 16, 1970) was an American screenwriter. He wrote for 50 films between 1914 and 1954. He was born in Quincy, Illinois. Son of Charles T. Dazey.

== Selected filmography ==
- Manhattan Madness (1916)
- The Prince of Avenue A (1920)
- Polly of the Storm Country (1920)
- Silk Hosiery (1920)
- Home Stuff (1921)
- Shadows of the Sea (1922)
- Rich Men's Wives (1922)
- Children of Dust (1923)
- Poor Men's Wives (1923)
- Mothers-in-Law (1923)
- The Gold Diggers (1923 - editor)
- For Another Woman (1924)
- Manhattan Madness (1925)
- Klondike Annie (1936)
