= Leonard Merrick =

English novelist (1864–1939)

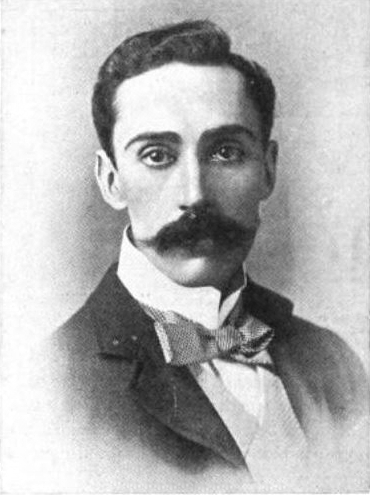
Leonard Merrick (1911)

Leonard Merrick (21 February 1864 – 7 August 1939) was an English novelist. Although less familiar in recent times, he was widely admired by his peers; J. M. Barrie called Merrick the "novelist's novelist."

== Life and work ==
He was born as Leonard Miller in Belsize Park, London, of Jewish parentage. After schooling at Brighton College, he studied to be a solicitor in Brighton and studied law at Heidelberg, but he was forced to travel to South Africa at the age of eighteen after his father suffered a serious financial loss. There he worked as an overseer in the Kimberley diamond mine and in a solicitor's office. After surviving a near-fatal case of "camp fever," he returned to London in the late 1880s and worked as an actor and actor-manager under the stage name of Leonard Merrick. He legally changed his name to Leonard Merrick in 1892. He later worked his experiences in South Africa and in the theatre into numerous works of fiction. Merrick's novels include Mr Bazalgette's Agent (1888), a detective story; Violet Moses (1891), about a Jewish financier and his troubled wife; The Worldlings (1900), a psychological investigation of a crime; Conrad in Quest of His Youth (1903), the tale of a disillusioned man who, at thirty-seven, sets out to pick up the romantic threads of his younger life, which is "judged his most successful work" according to John Sutherland; George Orwell thought that this is because it is one of the few of his books which is not set against a background of poverty.

Merrick was well regarded by other writers of his era. In 1918 fifteen writers, including famous authors such as H. G. Wells, J. M. Barrie, G. K. Chesterton and William Dean Howells, collaborated with publisher E. P. Dutton to issue The Works of Leonard Merrick in fifteen volumes, which were published between 1918 and 1922. Each volume in the series was selected and prefaced by one of the writers. In 2009, a biography was published titled Leonard Merrick: A Forgotten Novelist's Novelist by William Baker and Jeannettes Robert Shumaker, the first comprehensive treatment of Merrick. The title is taken in part from a quote by J. M. Barrie who called Merrick a "novelist's novelist." William Dean Howells wrote of Merrick "I can think of no recent fictionist of his nation who can quite match with Mr. Merrick in that excellence [of "shapeliness" or form in the novel]. This will seem great praise, possibly too great, to the few who have a sense of such excellence; but it will probably be without real meaning to most, though our public might well enjoy form if it could once be made to imagine it."

George Orwell, while describing Merrick as a "good bad writer", rather than a strictly good writer, admitted to a great admiration for his work; he particularly praised Cynthia (which was also a favourite of Chesterton's), the story of a struggling writer and his wife, and The Position of Peggy Harper, with its portrayal of the unromantic side of provincial theatre. In Orwell's view, nobody conveyed better than Merrick how dreary and dispiriting an actor's life can be. Graham Greene, another admirer, had recruited Orwell to write an introduction to any work by Merrick while Greene was publisher for Eyre & Spottiswoode in 1944. Orwell offered to write one for The Position of Peggy Harper, but nothing came of this.

At least eleven of Merrick's stories have been adapted to screen, most in the 1920s, including Conrad in Quest of His Youth (1920) directed by William C. deMille. Later adaptions include a 1931 film The Magnificent Lie based on the story "Laurels and the Lady", and a 1952 TV episode called "Masquerade" for Lux Video Theatre based on the story "The Doll in the Pink Silk Dress".

Merrick died on 7 August 1939 at the age of 75, twelve days before the start of World War II; he was at a London nursing home.

== Works ==
=== Novels ===
- Mr Bazalgette's Agent (1888)
- Violet Moses (1891)
- The Man Who Was Good (1892)
- Cynthia (1896)
- One Man's View (1897)
- The Actor-Manager (1898)
- The Worldlings (1900)
- When Love Flies out o' the Window (1902)
- Conrad in Quest of His Youth (1903)
- The Quaint Companions (1903)
- The House of Lynch (1907)
- The Position of Peggy Harper (1911)

=== Short story collections ===
- This Stage of Fools (1896)
- Whispers About Women (1906)
- The Man Who Understood Women (1908)
- While Paris Laughed (1918)
- A Chair on the Boulevard (1919)
- To Tell You the Truth (1922)
- The Call from the Past and Other Stories (1924)
- Four Stories (1927)
- The Little Dog Laughed (1930)

=== Plays ===
- The Free Pardon. Written with F. C. Philips
- When the Lamps are Lighted
- My Innocent Boy
- The Elixir of Youth
- A Woman in the Case. Written with George R. Sims

== Filmography ==
- The Impostor, directed by George Abbott and Dell Henderson (1918, based on the play The Imposter)
- The Worldlings, directed by Eric Harrison (UK, 1920, based on the novel The Worldlings)
- Conrad in Quest of His Youth, directed by William C. deMille (1920, based on the novel Conrad in Quest of His Youth)
- Fool's Paradise, directed by Cecil B. DeMille (1921, based on the story Laurels and the Lady)
- A Daughter of Luxury, directed by Paul Powell (1922, based on the play The Imposter)
- The Darling of the Rich, directed by John G. Adolfi (1922, based on the play The Imposter)
- A Thief in Paradise, directed by George Fitzmaurice (1925, based on the novel The Worldlings)
- School for Wives, directed by Victor Halperin (1925, based on the novel The House of Lynch)
- The Magnificent Lie, directed by Berthold Viertel (1931, based on the story Laurels and the Lady)
