= Molly and I =

1920 silent film

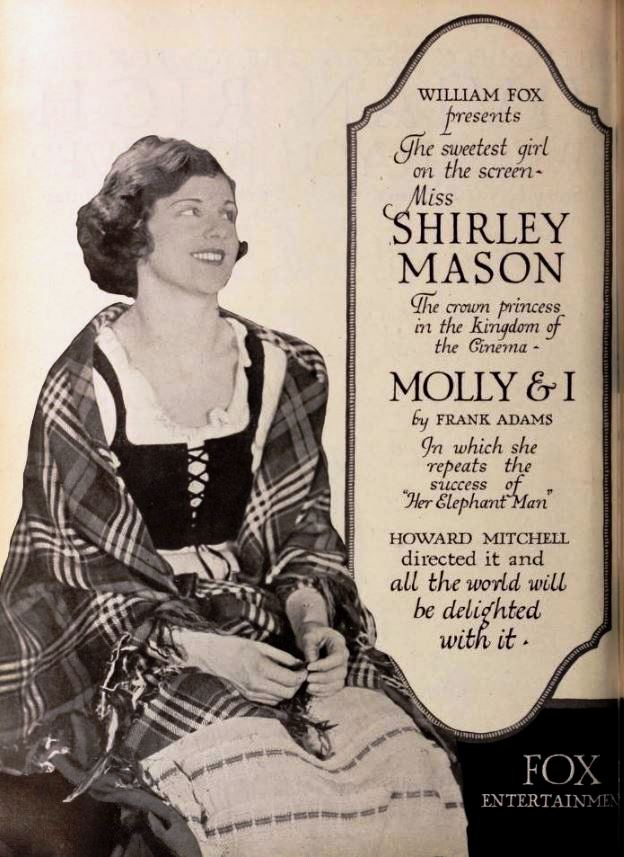
- Directed by: Howard M. Mitchell
- Written by: Frank R. Adams (novel); Isabel Johnston
- Produced by: William Fox
- Starring: Shirley Mason; Alan Roscoe; Harry Dunkinson
- Cinematography: George Schneiderman
- Edited by: Carl Himm
- Production company: Fox Film
- Distributed by: Fox Film
- Release date: April 1920
- Running time: 50 minutes
- Country: United States
- Languages: Silent; English intertitles

Molly and I is a lost 1920 American silent drama film directed by Howard M. Mitchell and starring Shirley Mason, Alan Roscoe and Harry Dunkinson.

== Plot ==
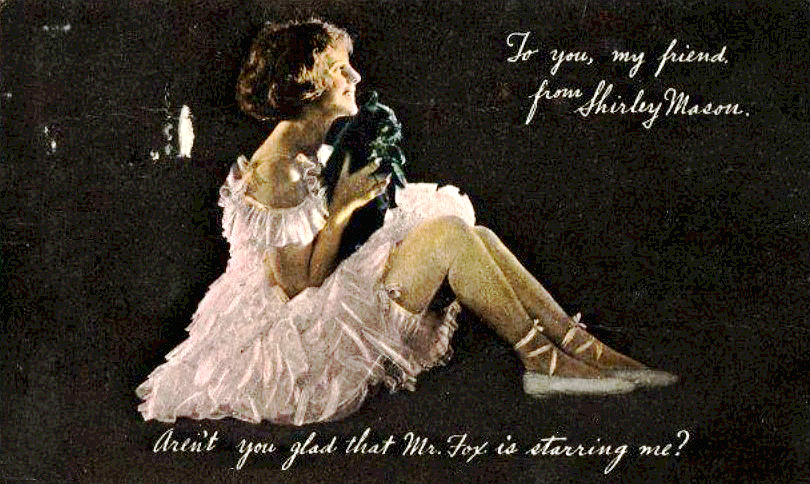
Promotional postcard mailed for Mason's 1920 film Molly and I

== Cast ==
- Shirley Mason as Molly / Shirley Brown
- Alan Roscoe as Philip Smith
- Harry Dunkinson as Jack Herrick
- Lila Leslie as Marion Sutherland

== Bibliography ==
- Solomon, Aubrey. The Fox Film Corporation, 1915-1935: A History and Filmography. McFarland, 2011.
