= Itching Palms =

1923 film

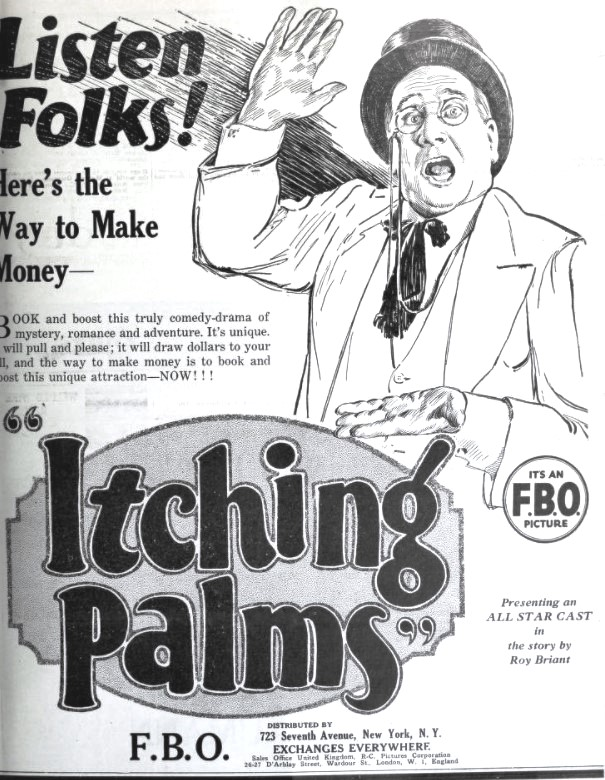
- Directed by: James W. Horne
- Written by: Roy Briant (play); Helmer Walton Bergman; Wyndham Gittens
- Starring: Tom Gallery; Herschel Mayall; Virginia Fox
- Cinematography: William Marshall
- Edited by: James Wilkinson
- Production company: Robertson-Cole Pictures Corporation
- Distributed by: Film Booking Offices of America
- Release date: July 22, 1923
- Running time: 60 minutes
- Country: United States
- Languages: Silent; English intertitles

Itching Palms is a 1923 American silent comedy horror film, directed by James W. Horne and starring Tom Gallery, Herschel Mayall and Virginia Fox.

== Cast ==
- Tom Gallery as Jerry
- Herschel Mayall as Jerry's Father
- Virginia Fox as Virgie
- Tom Wilson as Mac
- Joseph Harrington as Obadiah Simpkins
- Victor Potel as The Village Dumbbell
- Gertrude Claire as Grandma Gano
- Robert Walker as Dr. Peak
- Thomas G. Lingham as Judge Barrett
- Richard Cummings as Constable Coman

== Bibliography ==
- Connelly, Robert B. The Silents: Silent Feature Films, 1910-36, Volume 40, Issue 2. December Press, 1998.
- Munden, Kenneth White. The American Film Institute Catalog of Motion Pictures Produced in the United States, Part 1. University of California Press, 1997.
