= The Love Thief =

1926 film

- Directed by: John McDermott
- Written by: John McDermott
- Produced by: Carl Laemmle
- Starring: Norman Kerry; Greta Nissen; Marc McDermott
- Cinematography: John Stumar
- Production company: Universal Pictures
- Release date: June 13, 1926 (US)
- Running time: 7 reels
- Country: United States
- Language: English

The Love Thief is a 1926 silent black and white American romance film. Directed by John McDermott, it stars Norman Kerry, Greta Nissen, and Marc McDermott.

== Cast list ==
- Norman Kerry as Prince Boris Alexander Emanuel Augustus
- Greta Nissen as Princess Flavia Eugenia Marie
- Marc McDermott as Prince Karl
- Cissy Fitzgerald as Countess Leopold Marjenka
- Agostino Borgato as King
- Carrie Daumery as Queen
- Oscar Beregi as Prime minister
- Nigel Barrie as Captain Emanuel Menisurgo
- Vladimir Glutz as Napoleon Alexander Caesar
- Charles Puffy as Prince's guard
- Clarence Thompson as Prince Michael
- Alphonse Martel as Berzoff
- Anton Vaverka as Aide
- Lido Manetti as Captain
