= Isabel Johnston =

American screenwriter

- Born: July 16, 1898; Pittsburgh, Pennsylvania, USA
- Died: March 1981 (aged 82); Suffolk County, New York, USA
- Education: Vassar College
- Occupation: Screenwriter
- Parent: Isabel M. Johnston
- Relatives: Agnes Christine Johnston (sister)

Isabel Johnston (1898–1981) was an American screenwriter active during Hollywood's silent era. She also worked as a journalist and writer of short stories.

== Biography ==
Johnston was born in Pittsburgh, Pennsylvania, the daughter of Isabel McElheny and John Parry Johnson. Her work is often confused with that of her mother's, as her mother—a journalist—also wrote a few scenarios and was credited under her married name, Isabel M. Johnston. Her older sister, Agnes Christine, was a screenwriter in Hollywood.

As a teenager she began reading scripts for Vitagraph, and after graduating from Vassar in 1919, she returned to the film industry to write a string of films between 1920 and 1923. In 1921, she was added to the scenario staff at Goldwyn.

After working in Hollywood, she moved back to London for a few years to work with producers over there. She'd later follow in her mother's footsteps and become a journalist, working for papers in New York and Los Angeles, in addition to Liberty Magazine. She'd also write short stories for several decades.

Johnston, who never married, died in New York in 1981.

== Selected filmography ==
- Swords and the Woman (1923)
- Heroes of the Street (1922)
- Nineteen and Phyllis (1920)
- Peaceful Valley (1920)
- 45 Minutes from Broadway (1920)
- Love's Harvest (1920)
- Molly and I (1920)
- A Woman Who Understood (1920)
- Her Elephant Man (1920)
