= The Limited Mail =

1925 film

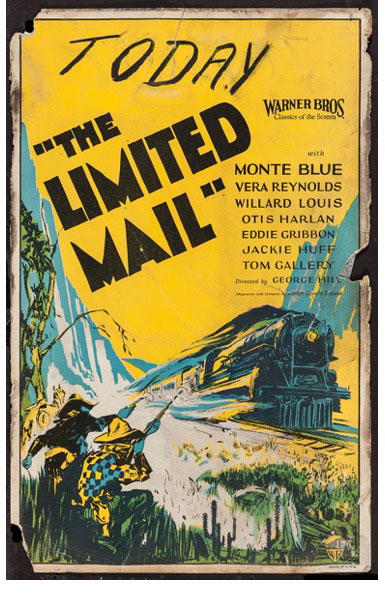
- Theatrical poster
- Directed by: George Hill
- Screenplay by: Charles Logue; Darryl F. Zanuck
- Starring: Monte Blue; Vera Reynolds; Willard Louis; Tom Gallery; Jack Huff; Eddie Gribbon
- Cinematography: Allen Q. Thompson; Charles Van Enger
- Production company: Warner Bros.
- Distributed by: Warner Bros.
- Release date: September 5, 1925
- Running time: 70 minutes
- Country: United States
- Language: Silent (English intertitles)

The Limited Mail is a 1925 American silent drama film directed by George Hill and written by Charles Logue and Darryl F. Zanuck. The film stars Monte Blue, Vera Reynolds, Willard Louis, Tom Gallery, Jack Huff, and Eddie Gribbon. The film was released by Warner Bros. on September 5, 1925.

== Plot ==
As described in a film magazine reviews, Bob Wilson becomes a tramp after his fiancée jilts him, but is influenced for good by Jim Fowler, a railway mail clerk. Bob gets employment with the railroad that employs Jim and works his way up to the post of engine driver. Both men fall in love with Caroline Dale, a waitress at the railroad hotel, but the young woman loves only Bob. Bob's former fiancée accidentally finds him and leaves her husband to be with him. Caroline misunderstands the situation and Bob nearly loses hope of winning her love. Bob is elevated to the engine cab of the Limited Mail train, and on his first run the train is wrecked. Jim, who is in the mail coach, is killed. Bob, fearing imprisonment for negligence, hides out with a tramp friend of his former days. One day he prevents the wrecking of another train and then returns to Caroline. He makes his explanation to the company and to Caroline, and he and the young woman are married.

== Cast ==
- Monte Blue as Bob Wilson/Bob Snobson
- Vera Reynolds as Caroline Dale
- Willard Louis as Joe Potts
- Tom Gallery as Jim Fowler
- Jack Huff as Bobby Fowler
- Eddie Gribbon as 'Spike' Nelson
- Otis Harlan as Mr. Joffrey
- Lydia Yeamans Titus as Mrs. O'Leary

== Preservation ==
A copy of The Limited Mail is held by the Library of Congress and a 16mm print is in the Wisconsin Center for Film and Theater Research. Several copies of The Limited Mail also preserved in film collections in the Netherlands and France.
