= A Woman Who Understood =

1920 film by William Parke

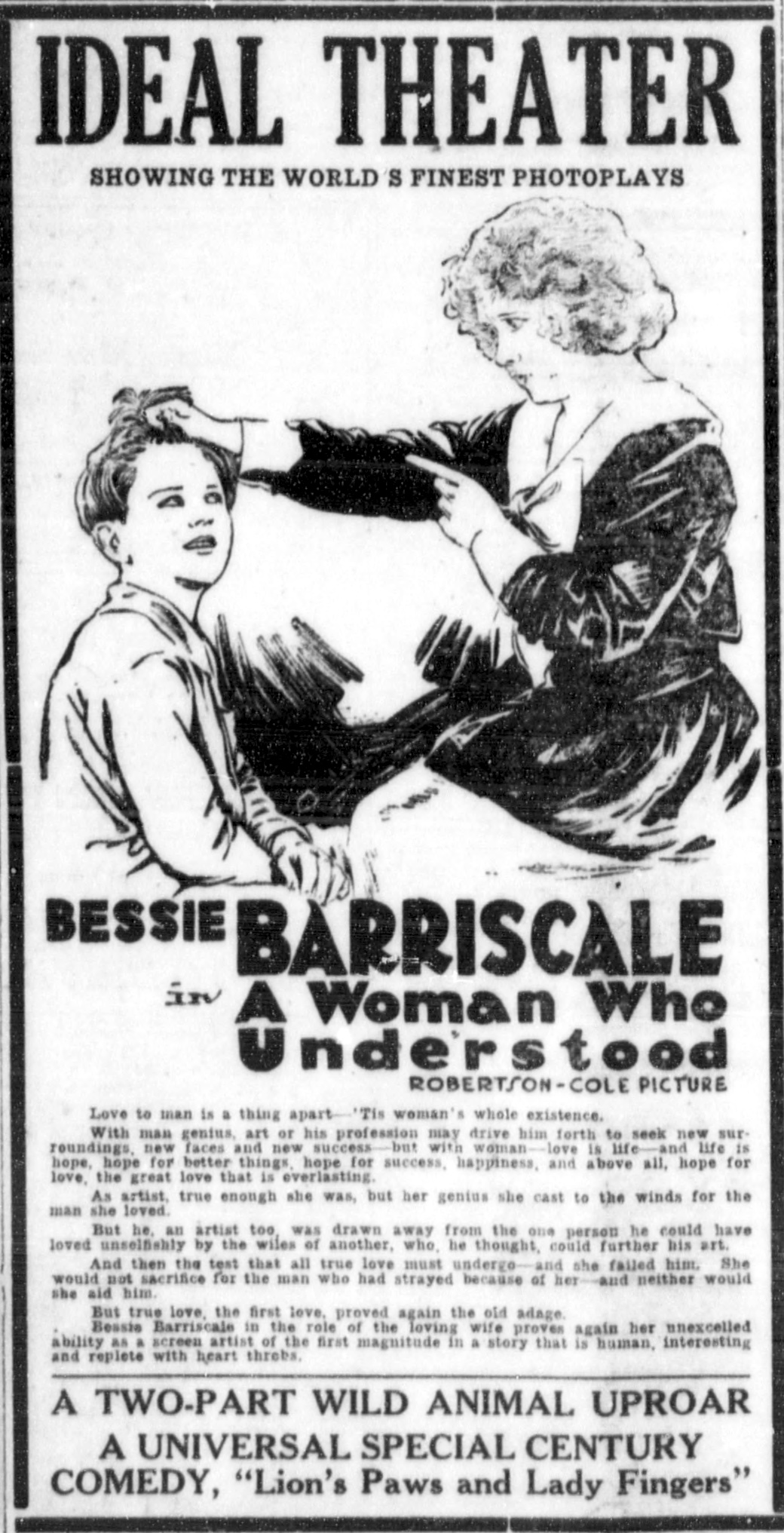
- A newspaper advertisement for the film.
- Directed by: William Parke
- Written by: Isabel Johnston (story)
- Starring: Bessie Barriscale
- Production company: Robertson-Cole
- Distributed by: Robertson-Cole
- Release date: March 14, 1920
- Running time: 5 reels
- Country: United States
- Language: Silent (English intertitles)

A Woman Who Understood is a 1920 American silent drama film, directed by William Parke, distributed by Robertson-Cole, and starring Bessie Barriscale.

== Plot ==
As described in a film magazine, Madge Graham (Barriscale), a sculptress who pays for her art work by conducting a tea room in Greenwich Village, New York City, saves violinist Robert Knight (Stanley) during an attempted suicide by throwing a tea cup through his window. She learns that he is despondent over a rejection by the young woman he loves and from losing his position in an orchestra. Her efforts get him his place back with the orchestra and they are married. Her interest in their children leads him to seek appreciation of his talent elsewhere, and he goes to his former sweetheart who is now Mrs. Alden (Cumming). In a fire he burns his hands. Mrs. Alden declines to offer her skin for an operation to save his hands, but when his wife consents he sees that she really understands him.

== Cast ==
- Bessie Barriscale as Madge Graham
- Forrest Stanley as Robert Knight
- Dorothy Cumming as Mrs. Alden
- Thomas Holding as Mr. Alden
- Stanton Williams as Bobbie Knight
- Mary Jane Irving as Peggy Knight
- Gloria Holt as Marion Alden
- Joe Butterworth as Jimmy

== Preservation ==
With no prints of A Woman Who Understood located in any film archives, it is considered a lost film.
