= The Magnificent Lie (1931 film) =

1931 film

- Directed by: Berthold Viertel
- Screenplay by: Vincent Lawrence; Leonard Merrick; Samson Raphaelson
- Starring: Ruth Chatterton; Ralph Bellamy; Stuart Erwin; Françoise Rosay; Sam Hardy; Charles Boyer; Tyler Brooke
- Cinematography: Charles Lang
- Music by: Karl Hajos; Rudolph G. Kopp; John Leipold
- Production company: Paramount Pictures
- Distributed by: Paramount Pictures
- Release date: July 25, 1931
- Running time: 81 minutes
- Country: United States
- Language: English

The Magnificent Lie is a 1931 American pre-Code drama film directed by Berthold Viertel and written by Vincent Lawrence, Leonard Merrick and Samson Raphaelson. The film stars Ruth Chatterton, Ralph Bellamy, Stuart Erwin, Françoise Rosay, Sam Hardy, Charles Boyer and Tyler Brooke. The film was released on July 25, 1931, by Paramount Pictures. It was based on Merrick's novel Laurels and the Lady.

== Plot ==
Recovering from a World War I head wound, soldier Bill Childers is paid a hospital visit by Rosa Duchene, a renowned French singer and actress who is contributing to the war effort. It is love at first sight, but Bill does not see her again for 12 years, during which time his combat injury has left him almost totally blind.

In the lumber business with partner Elmer Graham, word comes that the famous Rosa is coming to town to perform. Bill excitedly brings her flowers, but is duped by two French actors into believing that another woman, known as Poll, is actually Rosa.

Bill goes permanently blind and the haughty Rosa has no interest in him. Poll falls for Bill, but during her impersonation of the other woman, Bill recognizes their disparity in height. He is angered by her deception, he angrily leaves. An auto accident results in a serious leg injury for Poll but the sudden restoration of Bill's eyesight. Both agree to give their relationship one more try.

== Cast ==
- Ruth Chatterton as Poll
- Ralph Bellamy as Bill Childers
- Stuart Erwin as Elmer Graham
- Françoise Rosay as Rosa Duchêne
- Sam Hardy as Larry
- Charles Boyer as Jacques
- Tyler Brooke as Pierre LeCoeur
- Tyrell Davis as Clarence
- Jean Del Val as Stage Manager
