= Francis Charles Philips =

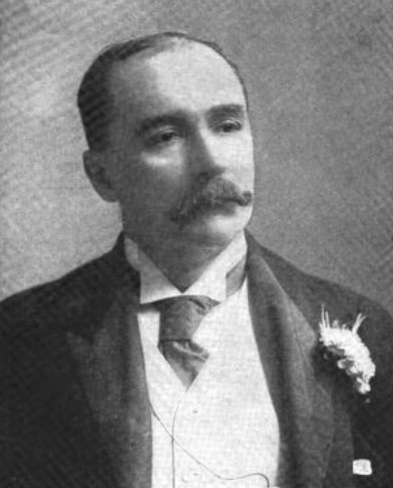
In The Sketch, 15 July 1896

Francis Charles Philips (3 February 1849 – 21 April 1921) was a British army officer, actor, theatre-manager, dramatist, barrister, journalist, short story writer and novelist. He wrote over forty novels and over a dozen plays.

== Biography ==
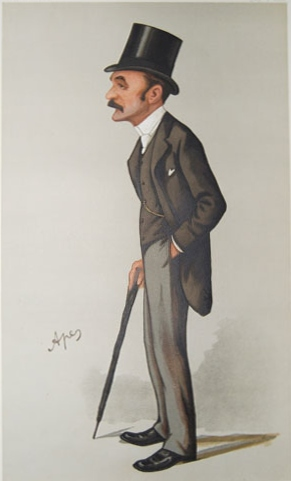
As in a Looking Glass. Caricature by Ape published in Vanity Fair in July 1888.

He was born at Brighton, the younger son of the Rev. George Washington Philips (1784–1865), a slave owner on St Kitts. He was educated at Brighton College.

His mother was Charlotte Elizabeth Philips née Jones, born Jesson, the daughter of Thomas Jesson of Hill Park, Kent, who had been first married to John Jones before her marriage to George Washington Philips.

After a course at Sandhurst, Philips became a British army officer, gazetted to the 2nd Queen's Royals shortly before his nineteenth birthday. He served for three years, mainly in Ireland and at Aldershot. After resigning his military commission, he became an actor, first in Liverpool and then in London. In 1880 he began the study of law and was called to the bar in 1884 at the Middle Temple.

Due to his friendship with Čedomilj Mijatović, Philips was made Knight Commander of the Order of St. Sava.

== Works ==
In 1886 for a paper called Life, Philips wrote a weekly serial entitled Le Journal d'une Mondaine. After the completion of the serial, he tried to have it published in book form. After rejection by five publishing companies, Philips, on the advice of his friend Edward Morton, submitted the work to Ward & Downey. The novel was then published in two volumes under the title As in a Looking Glass. The initial printing sold out in the first three weeks. The novel was then printed in a single volume at a price of six shillings, selling nearly 40,000 copies. Published in various editions, it was sold in nearly every country in Europe. Philips continued writing popular novels; his three other most successful novels were Jack and Three Jills, The Strange Adventures of Lucy Smith, and Mrs. Bouverie. He published in total 30 fiction titles.

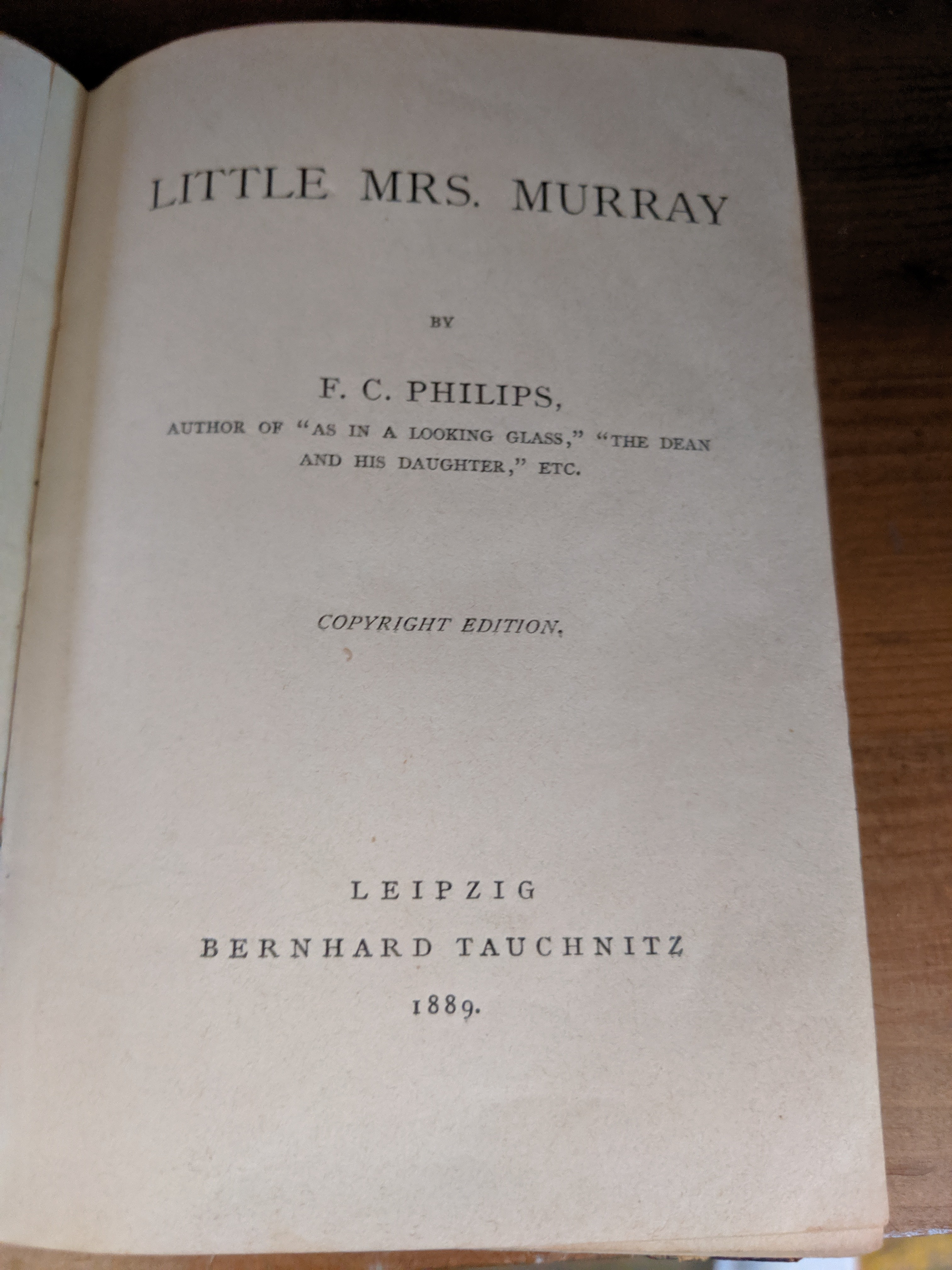
Little Mrs. Murray by Francis Charles Philips

In April 1889 Sarah Bernhardt was a success in the role of "Lena Despard", the main character in a French stage adaptation of the novel As in a Looking Glass.

Philips wrote many plays. He co-authored the play The Free Pardon with Leonard Merrick. He collaborated with Seymour Hicks on the play Papa's Wife, an adaptation of Philips's story In the Third Capacity.

== Family ==
Philips was twice a widower. By his first wife Maria he had a son. By his second wife Eva Maude Mary Kevill-Davies he a son and two daughters.

== Bibliography ==
=== Novels ===
- As in a Looking Glass (1885)
- Jack and Three Jills (1886)
- A Lucky Young Woman (1886)
- Social Vicissitudes (1886)
- The Dean and his Daughter (1887)
- The Strange Adventures of Lucy Smith (1887)
- The Fatal Phryne (1889)
- Young Mr. Ainslie's Courtship (1889)
- Little Mrs. Murray (1889)
- The Scudamores (1890)
- A Daughter's Sacrifice (1890)
- Margaret Byng (1890)
- Sybil Ross's Marriage: The Romance of an Inexperienced Girl (1890)
- A French Marriage (1890)
- My Face is my Fortune (1891)
- A Maiden Fair to See (1891)
- Extenuating Circumstances (1891)
- Madame Valérie (1892)
- Constance (1893)
- One Never Knows (1893)
- Mrs. Bouverie (1894)
- A Doctor in Difficulties (1894)
- A Devil in Nun's Veiling (1895)
- A Question of Colour (1895)
- The Luckiest of Three (1896)
- Poor Little Bella (1897)
- Men, Women, and Things (1898)
- A Woman of the World's Advice (1901)

=== Short stories ===
- The Worst Woman in London, and Other Stories (1895)
- An Undeserving Woman, and Other Stories (1896)

== See also ==
- As in a Looking Glass
