= 45 Minutes from Broadway =

1920 film

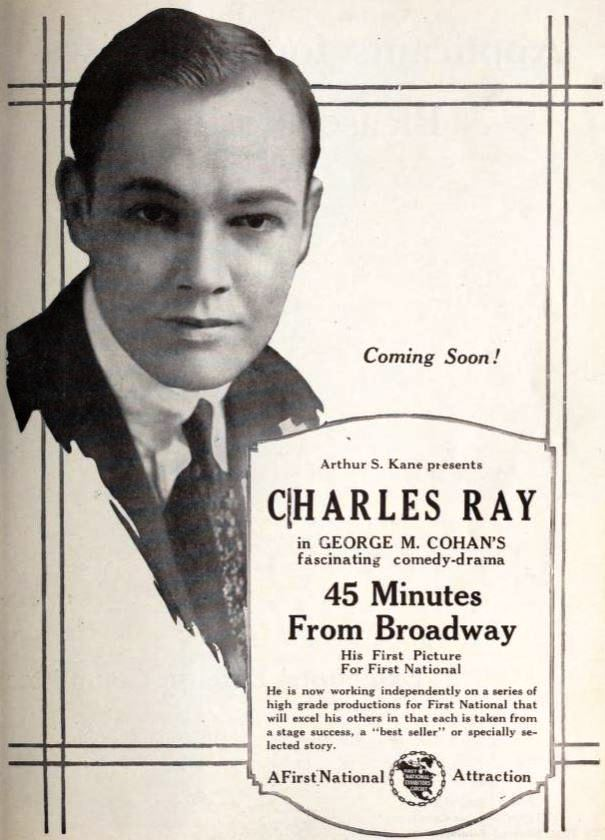
- Directed by: Joseph De Grasse
- Written by: Isabel Johnston; Bernard McConville
- Based on: Forty-five Minutes from Broadway by George M. Cohan
- Produced by: Arthur S. Kane
- Starring: Charles Ray; Dorothy Devore; Eugenie Besserer
- Cinematography: Chester A. Lyons
- Edited by: Harry L. Decker
- Production companies: Arthur S. Kane Pictures Corporation; Charles Ray Productions
- Distributed by: Associated First National Pictures
- Release date: August 29, 1920
- Running time: 60 minutes
- Country: United States
- Languages: Silent; English intertitles

45 Minutes from Broadway is a 1920 American silent comedy film directed by Joseph De Grasse and starring Charles Ray, Dorothy Devore and Eugenie Besserer. It was based on the 1906 play by George M. Cohan.

== Plot ==
After learning that his old friend Tom Burns has inherited a fortune, boxer Kid Burns heads to New Rochelle to congratulate him. There, at the estate left to Tom by his Uncle Castleton, Kid meets and is immediately enamored with the housemaid Mary.

After the old friends meet up Tom confides in Kid that he has fallen in love with Flora Dora Dean, an ex-chorus girl visiting with her mother. Upon meeting the women Kid believes that they are fortune-hunters and he tells Tom of his suspicions. Tom, offended by this has Kid thrown out of the house.

Later that night, while a party is being thrown at the mansion Kid discovers Flora's mother and an accomplice trying to rob the safe. After the pair are arrested he finds a paper stating that Mary, the housemaid, is the true heir to the fortune and he presents it to her, although due to her rise in station he no longer feels worthy to marry her. Mary, choosing love over money, rips up the paper so she and Kid can be together.

== Cast ==
- Charles Ray as Kid Burns
- Dorothy Devore as Mary Jane Jenkins
- Hazel Howell as Flora Dora Dean
- Eugenie Besserer as Mrs. David Dean
- May Foster as Mrs. Purdy
- Donald MacDonald as Tom Bennett
- Harry Myers as Daniel Cronin
- William Courtright as Andy Gray

== Reception ==
Moving Picture World's reviewer Edward Weitzel was very positive, finding the cast to be "excellent" and praising the settings for being "amply elaborate, without showing any signs of a desire to call attention to themselves."

Camera!'s review was also positive, praising Charles Ray's performance "Mr. Ray employs all of his youthful charm in the interpretation of the "Kid," with an unusually refreshing result."

== Bibliography ==
- Connelly, Robert B. The Silents: Silent Feature Films, 1910-36, Volume 40, Issue 2. December Press, 1998.
