= Alarm Clock Andy =

1920 film by Jerome Storm

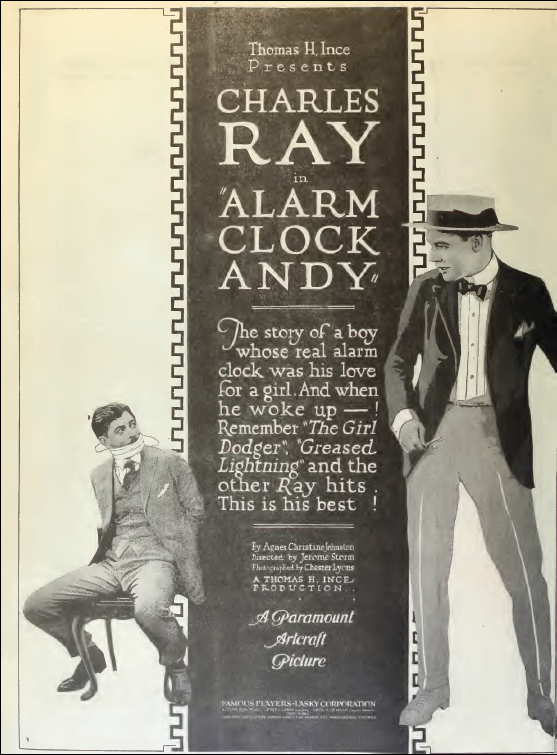
- Ad for film
- Directed by: Jerome Storm
- Screenplay by: Agnes Christine Johnston
- Produced by: Thomas H. Ince
- Starring: Charles Ray; Millicent Fisher; George Webb; Tom Guise; Andrew Robson
- Cinematography: Chester A. Lyons
- Production company: Thomas H. Ince Corporation
- Distributed by: Paramount Pictures
- Release date: March 14, 1920
- Running time: 50 minutes
- Country: United States
- Language: Silent (English intertitles)

Alarm Clock Andy is a 1920 American silent comedy film directed by Jerome Storm and written by Agnes Christine Johnston. The film stars Charles Ray, Millicent Fisher, George Webb, Tom Guise, and Andrew Robson. The film was released on March 14, 1920, by Paramount Pictures.

== Plot ==
As described in a film magazine, Andrew Gray is a shy young man who stutters but knows more about the automobile business of his employer Mr Wells than anyone else in the office, but his bashfulness keeps him back. William Blinker, a cocky young bluffer, advances to assistant manager just four months after starting work. Andrew hopelessly worships his employer's daughter Dorothy. The immediate success of the firm depends upon it landing a contract for large motor trucks from Josiah Dodge. William tries, but his freshness antagonizes Josiah and he fails. In the meantime Andrew meets Dorothy and when she thinks his name is Blinker, he is too bashful to deny it. He accidentally also meets Josiah. His personality appeals to both, and after a series of amusing complications brought about by his having assumed the name Blinker, he lands the Dodge contract and wins the young woman.

== Cast ==
- Charles Ray as Andrew Gray
- Millicent Fisher as Dorothy Wells
- George Webb as William Blinker
- Tom Guise as Mr. Wells
- Andrew Robson as Josiah Dodge

== Preservation ==
A print is preserved in the Library of Congress collection.
