= Agnes Christine Johnston =

American screenwriter

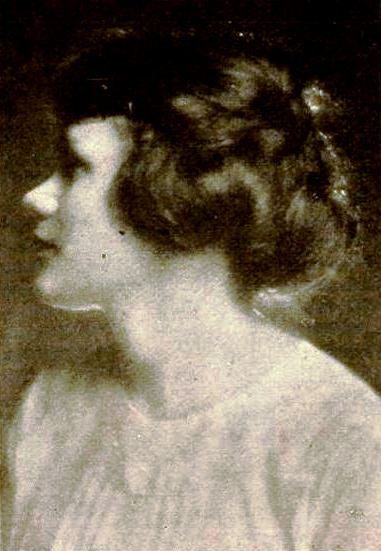
- Johnston in 1919
- Born: January 11, 1896; Swissvale, Pennsylvania, United States
- Died: July 19, 1978 (aged 82); San Diego, California, United States
- Occupation: Screenwriter
- Years active: 1915–1948
- Spouse: Frank Dazey
- Relatives: Isabel Johnston (sister)

Agnes Christine Johnston was an American screenwriter who wrote for more than 80 films between 1915 and 1948.

== Biography ==
=== Early life ===
Johnston was born in Swissvale, Pennsylvania, to John Johnston and Isabel McElhany. She attended the Horace Mann School and later took a playwright class at Harvard. Her sister Isabel Johnston also became a screenwriter.

=== Career ===
When Vitagraph gave her an assignment to write a scenario for a James Oliver Curwood novel God's Country and the Woman, she reportedly completed the scenario in 24 hours.

Johnston penned a number of Andy Hardy films starring Mickey Rooney—among them The Hardys Ride High, Andy Hardy's Double Life, and Andy Hardy's Blonde Trouble.

Her other films included the comedy Seventeen, the romantic comedy Janie and its sequel, Janie Gets Married, plus the 1946 adaptation of Black Beauty. She also wrote the musical comedy The Time, the Place and the Girl.

=== Personal life ===
Johnson was married to fellow screenwriter Frank Mitchell Dazey; the couple had three children together. Agnes died in San Diego, California, in 1978.

== Partial filmography ==
- An Amateur Orphan (1917)
- The Fires of Youth (1917)
- It Happened to Adele (1917)
- Her New York (1917)
- When Love Was Blind (1917)
- How Could You, Caroline? (1918)
- The Great Adventure (1918)
- Daddy-Long-Legs (1919)
- Alarm Clock Andy (1920)
- Her Husband's Friend (1920)
- Home Stuff (1921)
- Rich Men's Wives (1922)
- Children of Dust (1923)
- Poor Men's Wives (1923)
- Mothers-in-Law (1923)
- The Female (1924)
- Forbidden Paradise (1924)
- For Another Woman (1924)
- Proud Flesh (1925)
- Don't (1925)
- The Denial (1925)
- Lovey Mary (1926)
- The Enemy (1927)
- The Patsy (1928)
- The Shannons of Broadway (1929)
- The Divine Lady (1929)
- Lucky Devils (1933)
- Headline Shooter (1933)
- Andy Hardy's Blonde Trouble (1944)
- Mickey (1948)
