= John McDermott (director) =

American actor and film director (1893–1946)

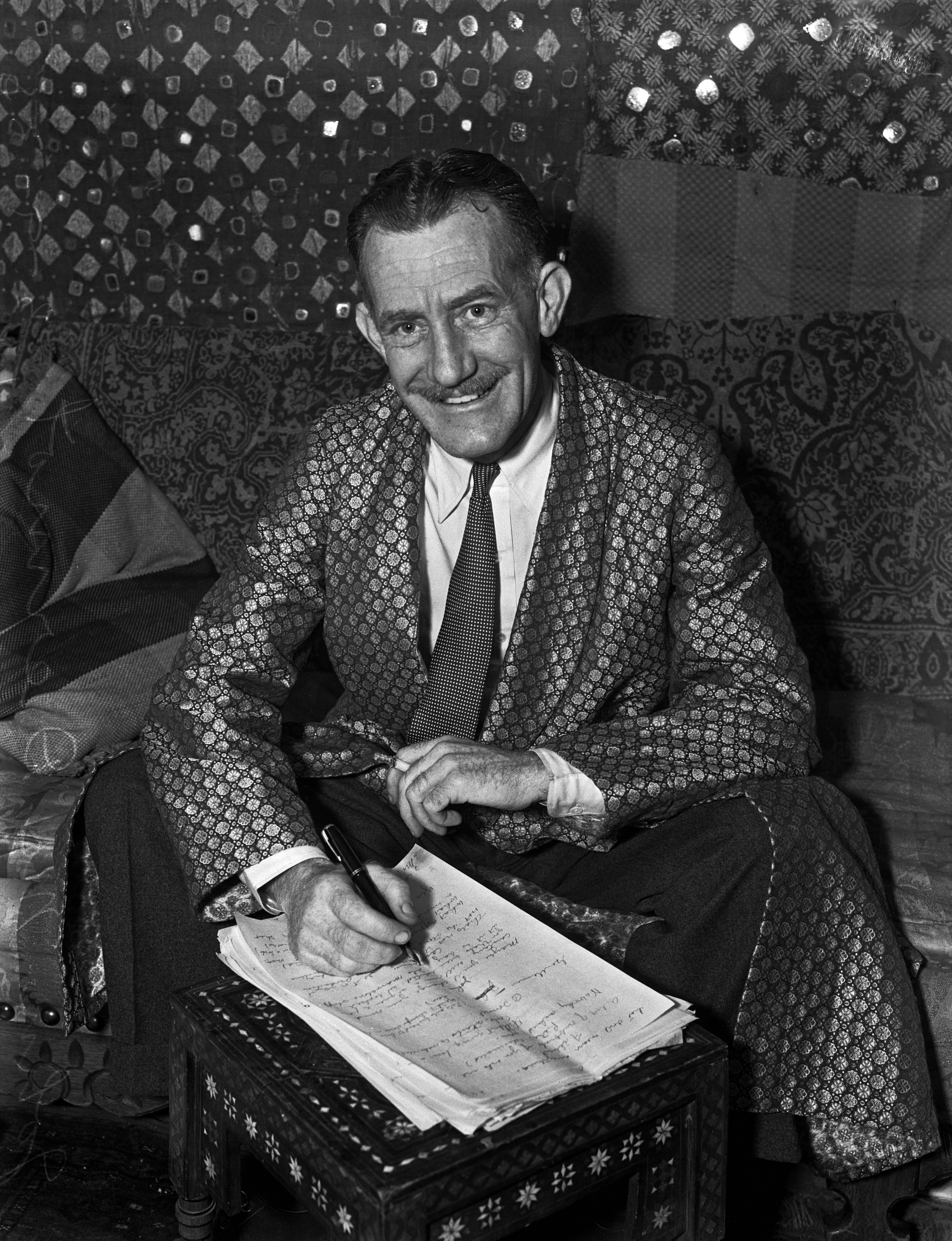
- McDermott in 1935
- Born: September 9, 1893; Green River, Wyoming, U.S.
- Died: July 22, 1946 (aged 52); Los Angeles, California, U.S.
- Other name: Jack McDermott
- Occupations: Director, writer, actor
- Years active: 1913–1946 (film)

John McDermott (September 9, 1893 – July 22, 1946) was an American film director, screenwriter and actor.

== Selected filmography ==
=== Director ===
- Dinty (1920)
- Patsy (1921)
- Her Temporary Husband (1923)
- Mary of the Movies (1923)
- The Spider and the Rose (1923)
- Manhattan Madness (1925)
- Where the Worst Begins (1925)
- The Love Thief (1926)

=== Screenwriter ===
- Fast Company (1918)
- Just Pals (1920)
- The Sky Pilot (1921)
- Three Wise Fools (1923)
- Rolling Home (1926)
- We're in the Navy Now (1926)
- Stranded in Paris (1926)
- Blonde or Brunette (1927)
- Evening Clothes (1927)
- Senorita (1927)
- She's a Sheik (1927)
- Flying Romeos (1928)
- The Fifty-Fifty Girl (1928)
- The Cohens and the Kellys in Scotland (1930)
- A Gentleman in Tails (1931)
- The Man in Evening Clothes (1931)
- Fast Workers (1933)
- Tillie and Gus (1933)
- College Rhythm (1934)
- Three Wise Fools (1946)

== Bibliography ==
- Katchmer, George A. A Biographical Dictionary of Silent Film Western Actors and Actresses. McFarland, 2009.
- Stumpf, Charles. ZaSu Pitts: The Life and Career. McFarland, 2010.
