= A Daughter of Luxury =

1922 film by Paul Powell

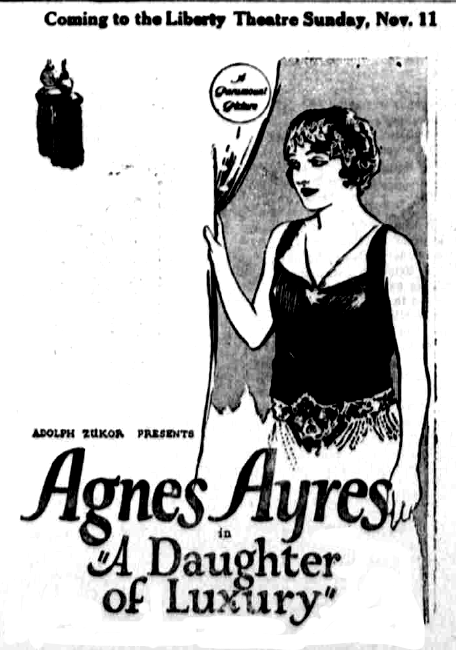
- Newspaper advertisement
- Directed by: Paul Powell
- Screenplay by: Beulah Marie Dix
- Based on: The Imposter by Leonard Merrick and Michael Morton
- Produced by: Adolph Zukor
- Starring: Agnes Ayres; Tom Gallery; Edith Yorke; Howard Ralston; Edward Martindel; Sylvia Ashton
- Cinematography: Bert Baldridge
- Production company: Famous Players–Lasky Corporation
- Distributed by: Paramount Pictures
- Release date: December 4, 1922
- Running time: 50 minutes
- Country: United States
- Language: Silent (English intertitles)

A Daughter of Luxury is a 1922 American silent comedy film directed by Paul Powell and written by Beulah Marie Dix based upon the play The Imposter by Leonard Merrick and Michael Morton. The film stars Agnes Ayres, Tom Gallery, Edith Yorke, Howard Ralston, Edward Martindel, and Sylvia Ashton. The film was released on December 4, 1922, by Paramount Pictures.

== Plot ==
When a lawsuit deprives a rich woman, Mary Fenton, of her wealth, she decides to impersonate another woman, Mary Cosgrove. The situation becomes sticky when Cosgroge turns up and demands Fenton be arrested.

== Cast ==
- Agnes Ayres as Mary Fenton
- Tom Gallery as Blake Walford
- Edith Yorke as Ellen Marsh
- Howard Ralston as Bill Marsh
- Edward Martindel as Loftus Walford
- Sylvia Ashton as Mrs. Walford
- Clarence Burton as Red Conroy
- ZaSu Pitts as Mary Cosgrove
- Robert Schable as Charlie Owen
- Bernice Frank as Winnie
- Dorothy Gordon as Genevieve Fowler
- Muriel McCormac as Nancy

== See also ==
- The Impostor (1918)
- The Darling of the Rich (1922)
