= Forty-five Minutes from Broadway =

Musical by George M. Cohan

Forty-Five Minutes From Broadway
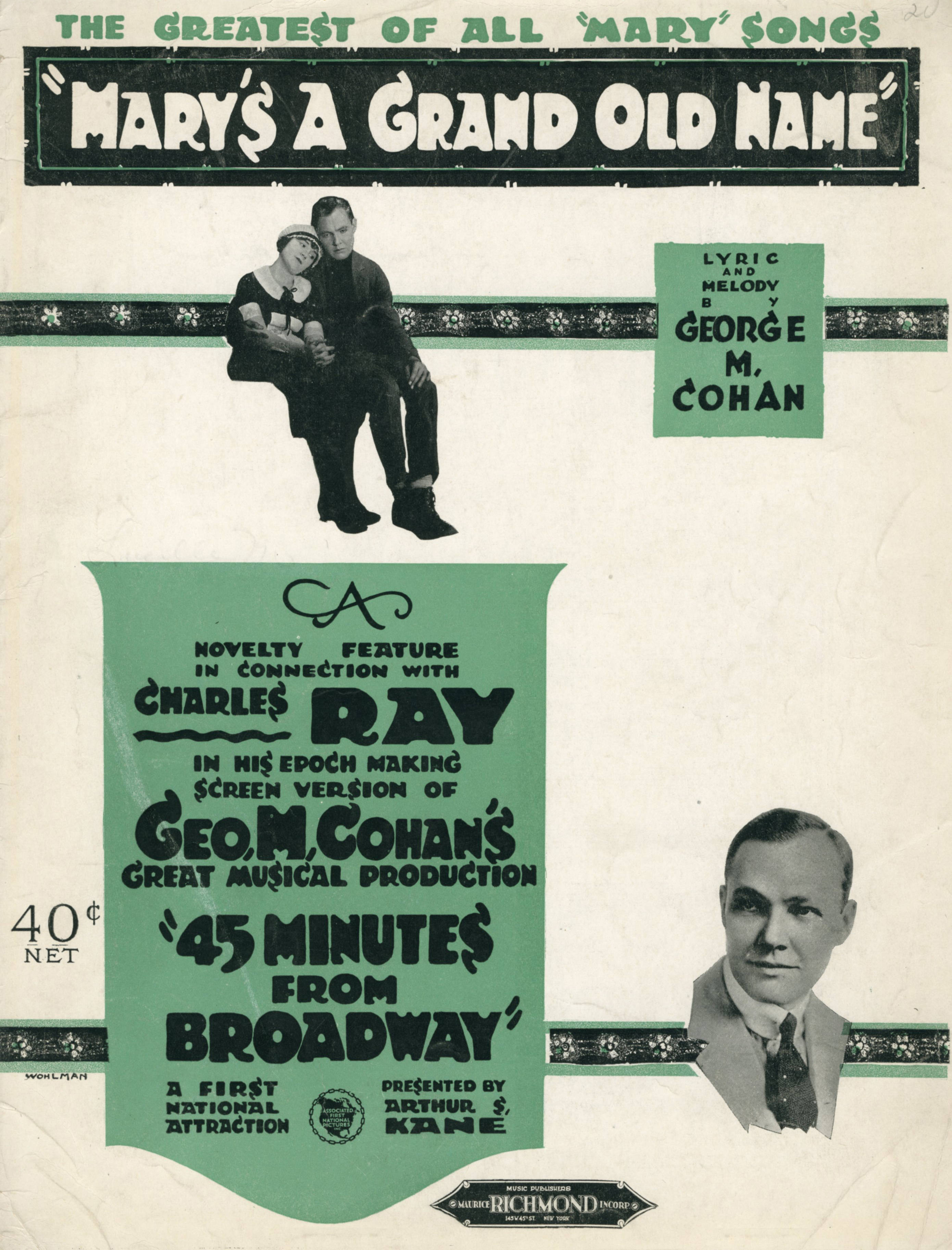
- Sheet music cover for "Mary's a Grand Old Name" noting the 1920 film based on the play
- Music: George M. Cohan
- Lyrics: George M. Cohan
- Book: George M. Cohan
- Productions: 1906 Broadway

Forty-Five Minutes From Broadway is a three-act musical by George M. Cohan written about the town of New Rochelle, New York. The title refers to the 45-minute train ride from New Rochelle to Broadway. The story concerns a romance between a maid who stands to inherit a fortune and an unpopular out-of-towner.

The musical premiered on Broadway in 1906 and was briefly revived in 1912. It was adapted as silent film and broadcast live on television in 1959.

== Production history ==
The musical debuted on January 1, 1906, at the New Amsterdam Theatre on Broadway and ran for 90 performances before closing on March 17. The role of Mary Jane Jenkins was created by Fay Templeton and Kid Burns was played by Victor Moore. Frederick Solomon was music director for the production. The musical re-opened later the same year, on November 5, at the New York Theatre with the cast almost unchanged. It played there for an additional 32 performances before closing on December 1. Its only Broadway revival after that was from March 14 to April 13, 1912, at George M. Cohan's Theatre, where it ran for 36 performances with a different cast.

== Musical numbers ==
- "Gentlemen of the Press" – Policemen and Reporters
- "(I Want to Be a) Popular Millionaire" – Tom Bennett and Chorus
- "Mary Is a Grand Old Name" – Mary Jane Jenkins
- "Forty-Five Minutes from Broadway" – Kid Burns and Chorus
- "So Long, Mary" – Mary Jane Jenkins and Chorus

== Lyrics excerpt ==
=== Forty-five Minutes from Broadway ===
Only forty-five minutes from Broadway
Think of the changes it brings
For the short time it takes
What a diff'rence it makes
In the ways of the people and things
Oh, what a fine bunch of reubens
Oh, what a jay atmosphere
They have whiskers like hay
And imagine Broadway
Only forty-five minutes from here

== Characters ==
- Tom Bennett
- Fannie Fordham
- Polly Poughkeepsie
- Flora Dora Dean
- Andy Gray
- Minnie Melrose
- Tessy Tarrytown
- Rose Rye
- Daniel Cronin
- Winnie Wakefield
- Teresa Tuckahoe
- Pauline Peekskill
- Kid Burns
- James Blake
- Mrs. David Dean
- Mrs. Purdy
- Mary Jane Jenkins
- Reporters / Policemen
- Messenger boy

== Plot ==
In New Rochelle, New York, the passing of Old Man Castleton, a miserly millionaire, starts a rumor around the town that in his will, he left everything to his maid servant, Mary Jane Jenkins. The townsfolk gather at the Castleton mansion to search for the will, but none can be found. By default, without the will, the estate will go to Castleton's nephew, Tom Bennett.

Bennett announces that when his actress fiancée Flora Dora Dean arrives, they will marry ("Gentlemen of the Press"). He further explains that he what he really wants is to become rich (“I Want to Be a Popular Millionaire"). With Bennett is his secretary, Kid Burns, a wise-guy who quickly alienates himself from the townsfolk.

Mary discovers that Burns's mother and she share the same name ("Mary’s a Grand Old Name"). Burns becomes enamored of Mary and asks her out for a night on the town. However, he worries that a night in New Rochelle might not be as enticing as a night in Manhattan ("Forty-Five Minutes from Broadway").

Burns finds Castleton's will and gives it to Mary, who suspects that he might only love her for her money. Upon hearing this, Burns declares that he will marry her without Castleton's money. Mary tears up the will; and she and Burns take the train to Manhattan. The townsfolk of New Rochelle bid them good-bye ("So Long, Mary").

== New Rochelle reaction ==
When the musical opened on Broadway in 1906, the town of New Rochelle, New York, threatened to sue Cohan on account of the lyrics in the song "Forty-five Minutes from Broadway" describing their townsfolk as "rubes" with "whiskers like hay"; and also that the town had only one cafe. The town did not bring suit against Cohan; instead, the Chamber of Commerce issued a proclamation urging residents to boycott the musical. Due to the show's success, theatergoers began traveling to New Rochelle. This newfound interest and tourist attraction resulted in the town tearing up the proposed writ. Fifty-three years later, on March 15, 1959, the Mayor's office in New Rochelle issued a proclamation: "This delightful work did so much to make New Rochelle nationally and favorably known that today is proclaimed by the Mayor as Omnibus day in New Rochelle." The proclamation was read by Alistair Cooke on the American educational television series Omnibus at the beginning of the televised version of the musical.

== Adaptations ==
In 1920, the musical was adapted into a silent film, 45 Minutes from Broadway starring Charles Ray.

Two songs from the original production, "Mary Is a Grand Old Name" and "So Long Mary", were performed in the 1942 George M. Cohan biopic Yankee Doodle Dandy, although the film segments bore no resemblance to the 1906 musical.

On March 15, 1959, the American television series Omnibus telecast a live version of the musical with Tammy Grimes as Mary Jane Jenkins, Russell Nype as Tom Bennett and Larry Blyden as Kid Burns. Gower Champion directed, and Alistair Cooke hosted the program.
