= Home Stuff =

1921 silent film

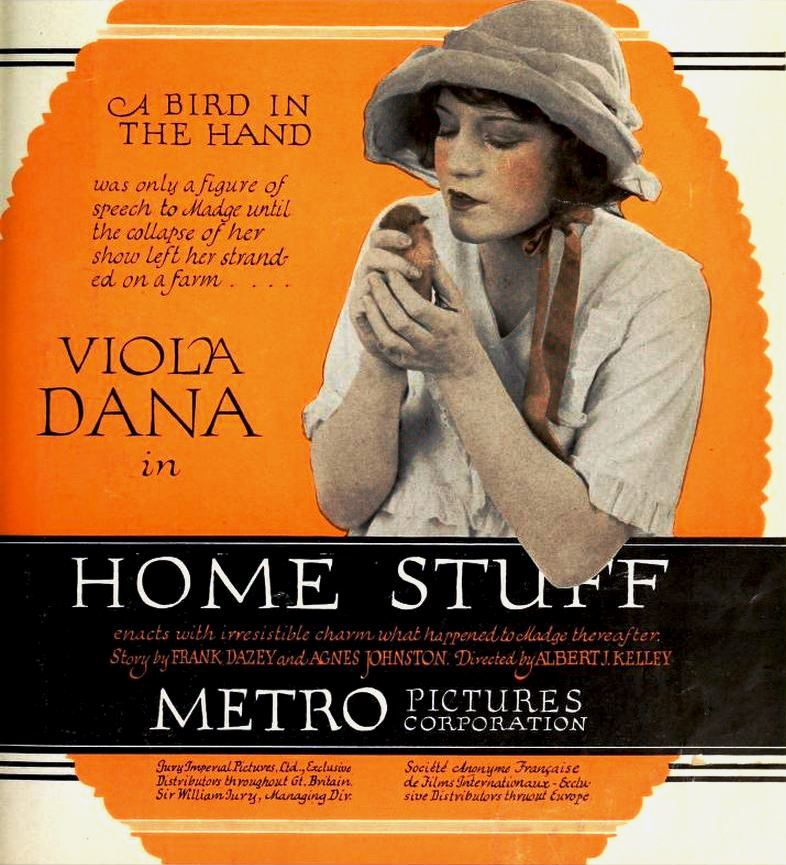
- Directed by: Albert H. Kelley
- Written by: Frank Mitchell Dazey; Agnes Christine Johnston
- Starring: Viola Dana; Tom Gallery; Josephine Crowell
- Cinematography: John Arnold
- Production company: Metro Pictures
- Distributed by: Metro Pictures
- Release date: June 16, 1921
- Running time: 50 minutes
- Country: United States
- Languages: Silent; English intertitles

Home Stuff is a 1921 American silent comedy film directed by Albert H. Kelley and starring Viola Dana, Tom Gallery and Josephine Crowell.

== Cast ==
- Viola Dana as Madge Joy
- Tom Gallery as Robert Deep
- Josephine Crowell as 'Ma' Deep
- Nelson McDowell as 'Pa' Deep
- Priscilla Bonner as Susan Deep
- James Robert Chandler as Mr. 'Pat'
- Aileen Manning as Mrs. 'Pat'
- Philip Sleeman as Jim Sackett

== Bibliography ==
- Munden, Kenneth White. The American Film Institute Catalog of Motion Pictures Produced in the United States, Part 1. University of California Press, 1997.
