= Home Struck =

1927 film by Ralph Ince

- Directed by: Ralph Ince
- Written by: Ewart Adamson; Peter Milne
- Starring: Viola Dana; Alan Brooks; Tom Gallery; Nigel Barrie
- Cinematography: Jules Cronjager
- Production company: Robertson-Cole Pictures Corporation
- Distributed by: Film Booking Offices of America
- Release date: January 9, 1927
- Country: United States
- Languages: Silent; English intertitles

Home Struck is a 1927 American silent film directed by Ralph Ince and starring Viola Dana, Alan Brooks and Tom Gallery.

== Cast ==
- Viola Dana as Barbara Page
- [Alan Brooks as Lyn Holmes
- Tom Gallery as Dick Cobb
- Nigel Barrie as Warren Townsend
- George Irving as President Wallace
- Charles Howard as Nick Cohen

== Bibliography ==
- Quinlan, David. The Illustrated Guide to Film Directors. Batsford, 1983.
