= The Darling of the Rich =

1922 film directed by John G. Adolfi

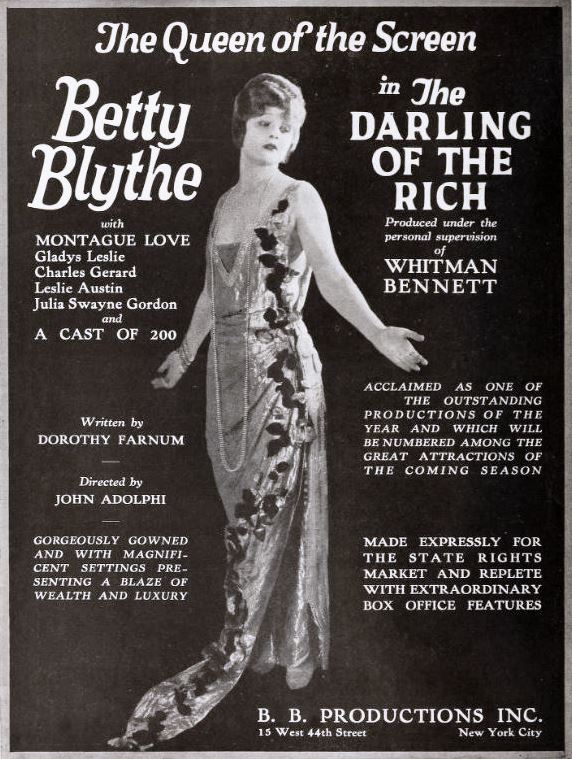
- Trade advertisement
- Directed by: John G. Adolfi
- Written by: Dorothy Farnum
- Based on: The Imposter by Leonard Merrick and Michael Morton
- Produced by: Whitman Bennett
- Starring: Betty Blythe; Gladys Leslie; Montagu Love
- Cinematography: Edward Paul
- Production company: Betty Blythe Productions
- Distributed by: States rights
- Release date: December 6, 1922
- Running time: 60 minutes
- Country: United States
- Language: Silent (English intertitles)

The Darling of the Rich is a 1922 American silent drama film directed by John G. Adolfi and starring Betty Blythe, Gladys Leslie, and Montagu Love.

== Cast ==
- Betty Blythe as Charmion Winship
- Gladys Leslie as Lizzie Callahan
- Jane Jennings as Jane Winship
- Montagu Love as Peyton Martin
- Charles K. Gerrard as Torrence Welch
- Leslie Austin as Mason Lawrence
- Julia Swayne Gordon as Dippy Helen
- Albert Hackett as Fred Winship
- Walter Walker as Mike Callahan

== See also ==
- The Impostor (1918)
- A Daughter of Luxury (1922)

== Bibliography ==
- Munden, Kenneth White. The American Film Institute Catalog of Motion Pictures Produced in the United States, Part 1. University of California Press, 1997.
