= Any Night =

1922 film

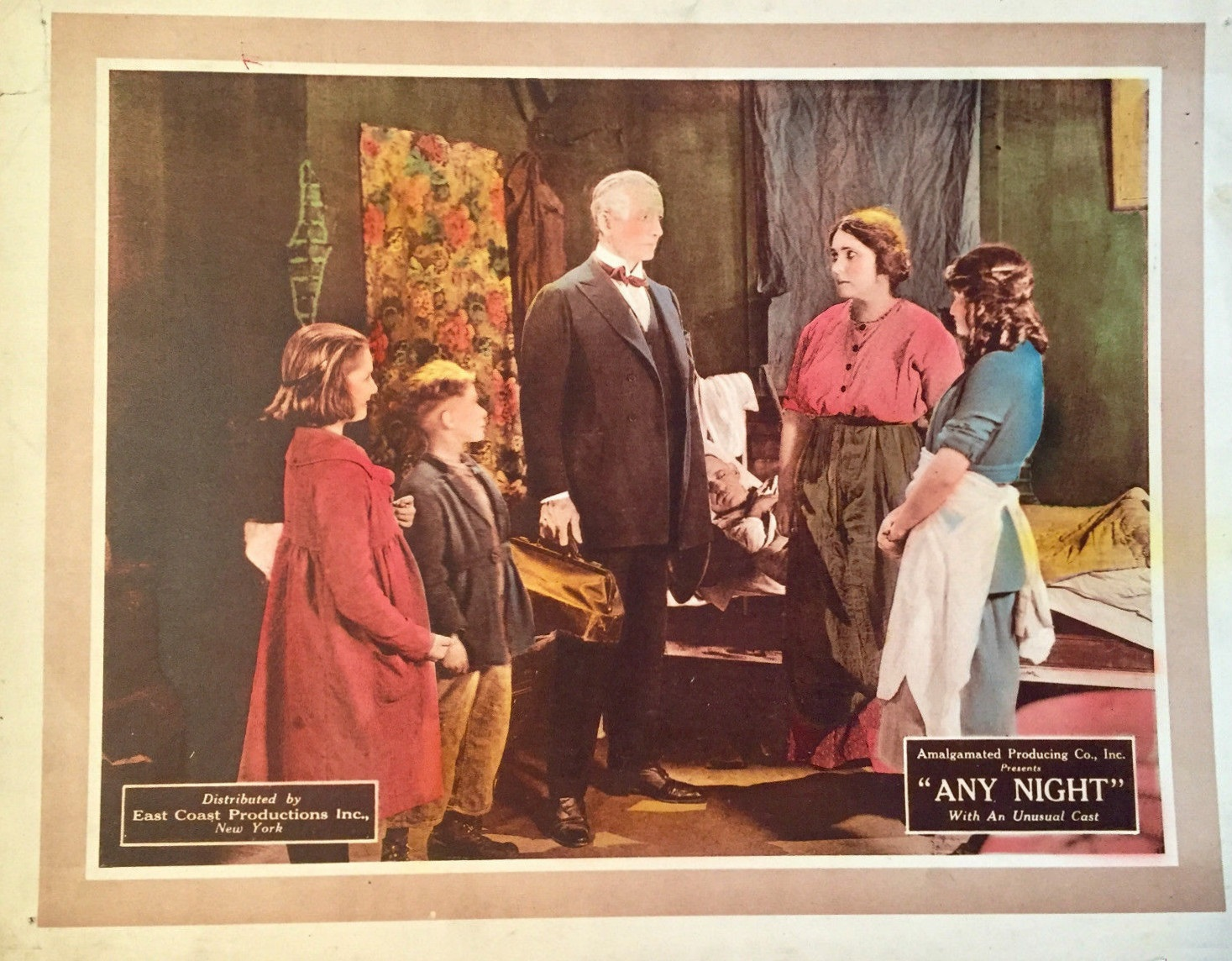
- Directed by: Martin Beck
- Produced by: Gilbert M. Anderson
- Starring: Tully Marshall; Robert Edeson; Lila Leslie
- Cinematography: Arthur Reeves
- Edited by: Walter A. Rivers
- Production company: Amalgamated Producing Corporation
- Distributed by: East Coast Productions
- Release date: January 1922
- Running time: 50 minutes
- Country: United States
- Languages: Silent; English intertitles

Any Night is a 1922 American silent crime film directed by Martin Beck and starring Tully Marshall, Robert Edeson and Lila Leslie.

== Cast ==
- Tully Marshall as Jerry Maguire
- Robert Edeson as Jim Barton
- Lila Leslie as Mrs. Ann Barton
- Gordon Sackville as Reverend John Matthew
- William Courtleigh as Dr. LeRoy Clifford

== Bibliography ==
- Connelly, Robert B. The Silents: Silent Feature Films, 1910-36, Volume 40, Issue 2. December Press, 1998.
- Munden, Kenneth White. The American Film Institute Catalog of Motion Pictures Produced in the United States, Part 1. University of California Press, 1997.
