= Conrad in Quest of His Youth =

1920 film by William C. deMille

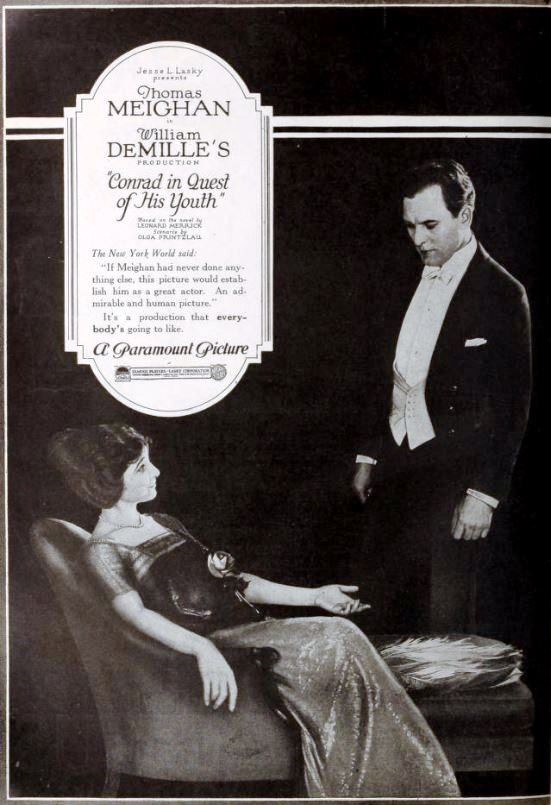
- Advertisement
- Directed by: William C. deMille
- Written by: Olga Printzlau (scenario)
- Based on: Conrad in Quest of His Youth by Leonard Merrick
- Produced by: Adolph Zukor; Jesse Lasky
- Starring: Thomas Meighan
- Cinematography: L. Guy Wilky
- Distributed by: Paramount Pictures
- Release date: December 5, 1920
- Running time: 6 reels, 5,926 feet
- Country: United States
- Language: Silent (English intertitles)

Conrad in Quest of His Youth is a 1920 American silent comedy-drama film directed by William C. deMille and starring Thomas Meighan. The film is based on the 1903 novel Conrad in Search of His Youth by Leonard Merrick which was adapted and written for the screen by Olga Printzlau. The film survives at the Library of Congress.

== Cast ==
- Thomas Meighan as Conrad Warrener
- Mabel Van Buren as Nina
- Mayme Kelso as Gina
- Bertram Johns as Ted
- Margaret Loomis as Roslind
- Sylvia Ashton as Mary Page
- Kathlyn Williams as Mrs. Adaile
- Charles Ogle as Dobson
- Ruth Renick as Tattie
- A. Edward Sutherland as Conrad (at 17) (billed as Eddie Sutherland)

== Home media ==
Conrad in Quest of His Youth was released on Region 0 DVD-R by Alpha Video on January 28, 2014.
