= Lila Leslie =

Scottish actress (1890–1940)

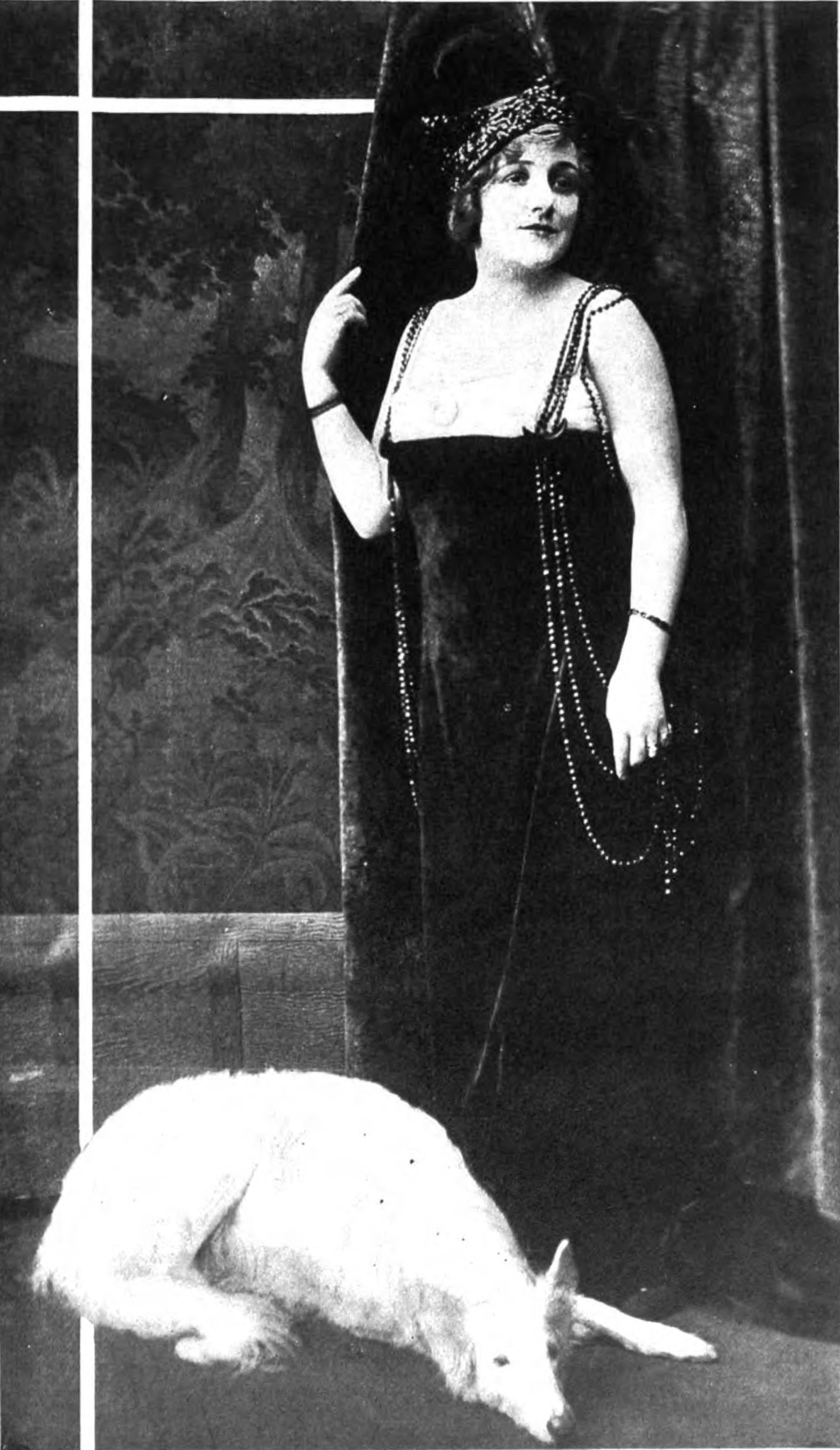
- Motion Picture Magazine, 1915
- Born: 1 January 1890; Scotland, United Kingdom
- Died: 8 September 1940 (aged 50); Los Angeles, California, USA
- Years active: 1913–1933
- Spouse: Joseph W. Smiley

Lila Leslie (1 January 1890 – 8 September 1940) was a Scottish actress of the silent era. She appeared in more than 70 films between 1913 and 1933. She was born in Glasgow, Scotland and died in Los Angeles, California.

== Selected filmography ==
- The Lion and the Mouse (1914)
- The Daughters of Men (1914)
- A Modern Thelma (1916)
- The Silent Woman (1918)
- The Man Who Stayed at Home (1919)
- Johnny-on-the-Spot (1919)
- Satan Junior (1919)
- Love's Harvest (1920)
- The Best of Luck (1920)
- Number 99 (1920)
- Blue Streak McCoy (1920)
- Molly and I (1920)
- The Butterfly Man (1920)
- Keeping Up with Lizzie (1921)
- A Guilty Conscience (1921)
- The Son of Wallingford (1921)
- The Men of Zanzibar (1922)
- Gay and Devilish (1922)
- Any Night (1922)
- A Front Page Story (1922)
- The Hottentot (1922)
- What Wives Want (1923)
- Why Men Leave Home (1924)
- Being Respectable (1924)
- The Last Edition (1925)
- Skinner's Dress Suit (1926)
- Things Wives Tell (1926)
- Home Sweet Home (1926)
- Forever After (1926)
- Getting Gertie's Garter (1927)
- The Secret Studio (1927)
- The First Night (1927)
