= Tom Gallery =

American actor

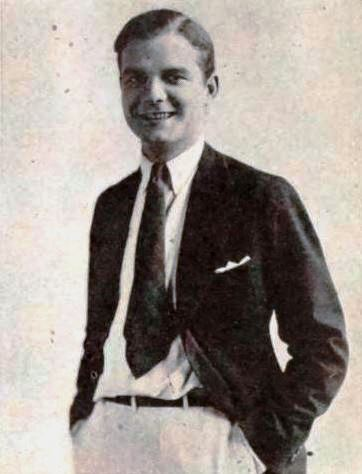
- Gallery c.1921
- Born: Thomas Patrick Sarsfield Gallery; November 27, 1897; Chicago, Illinois, U.S.
- Died: August 25, 1993 (aged 95); Encino, California, U.S.
- Occupations: Actor, sports promoter, television executive
- Years active: 1920–1927
- Spouses: ZaSu Pitts (m. 1920; div. 1933): Lillian Fette (m.1939?)
- Children: 3

Thomas Patrick Sarsfield Gallery (November 27, 1897 – August 25, 1993) was an American silent film actor, sports promoter, and television executive.

Gallery appeared in 21 films between 1920 and 1927. Subsequent to his acting career, he became a successful promoter of boxing and other sports. In 1944 he ran the day-to-day operations of the Brooklyn Tigers football team while owner Dan Topping served in the US Marine Corps. After the war, Gallery served as a sports broadcasting executive for the DuMont and NBC television networks.

Gallery was married to actress ZaSu Pitts from 1920 to 1933.

== Selected filmography ==
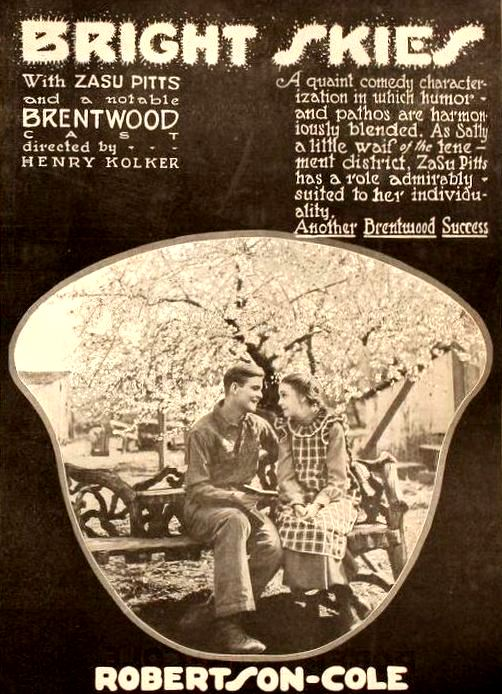
Ad for the film Bright Skies (1920) with Tom Gallery and ZaSu Pitts

- Dinty (1920)
- The Chorus Girl's Romance (1920)
- A Parisian Scandal (1921)
- The Son of Wallingford (1921)
- Home Stuff (1921)
- Patsy (1921)
- Bob Hampton of Placer (1921)
- Grand Larceny (1922)
- The Wall Flower (1922)
- A Daughter of Luxury (1922)
- The Eternal Three (1923)
- Itching Palms (1923) directed by James W. Horne
- The Limited Mail (1925)
- Under the Rouge (1925)
- One Round Hogan (1927)
- Home Struck (1927)
- A Dog of the Regiment (1927)
