= Dynamite Smith =

1924 silent film by Ralph Ince

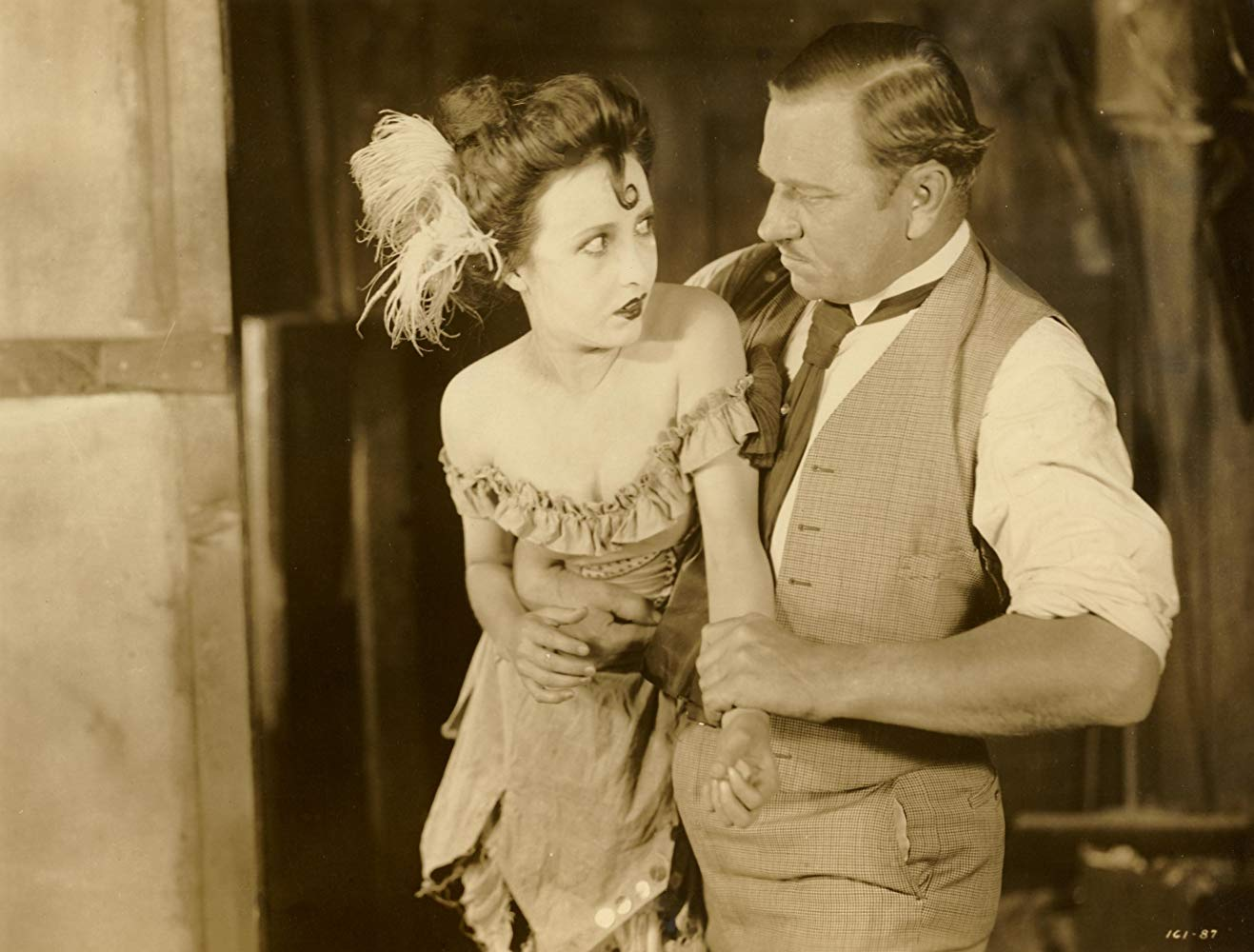
- Bessie Love and Wallace Beery
- Directed by: Ralph Ince
- Screenplay by: C. Gardner Sullivan
- Story by: C. Gardner Sullivan
- Starring: Charles Ray; Jacqueline Logan; Bessie Love; Wallace Beery
- Cinematography: Henry Sharp
- Distributed by: Pathé Exchange
- Release date: October 12, 1924 (U.S.)
- Running time: 6,400 feet; approx. 70 minutes
- Country: United States
- Language: Silent (English intertitles)

Dynamite Smith is a 1924 American silent drama film directed by Ralph Ince and written by C. Gardner Sullivan. The film stars Charles Ray, Bessie Love, and Wallace Beery, and was distributed through Pathé Exchange.

The film was presumed lost until 2023, when an 8mm print with Dutch intertitles was discovered.

== Plot ==
Gladstone Smith is a reserved literary editor working for a newspaper in San Francisco, California. His boss assigns him to report on a stabbing in the rough Barbary Coast district of the city. Smith goes to the Diamond Café, a saloon operated by the violent "Slugger" Rourke. Once there, Smith meets Rourke's estranged wife Violet, who works there as a cabaret singer. She gives him information for his story.

When the newspaper publishes Smith's story, the police start investigating Rourke. Enraged, he assaults the pregnant Violet and vows to kill Smith. Violet persuades Smith to take her to Alaska; due to her pregnancy, they pretend to be siblings.

In Alaska, Violet dies after giving birth to a son. Smith takes the infant to the town of White City, where they receive help from Kitty Gray, the proprietor of a local inn. Smith becomes a local hero after alerting the town to starving settlers trapped in a nearby mountain pass. He is appointed sheriff of White City.

Rourke arrives in White City, claiming to be Smith's friend. He moves into Smith's cabin, threatening to expose him as a "wife stealer". Rourke also shows unwanted interest in Kitty. A fearful Smith resolves to deal with Rourke. Smith leads Roarke into the wilderness, traps him, and lights a fuse to dynamite near Roarke. The explosion kills him. Smith is exonerated by the community and becomes engaged to Kitty, with whom he plans to raise Violet's child.

== Cast ==
1924 silent film

- Charles Ray as Gladstone Smith
- Wallace Beery as "Slugger" Rourke
- Bessie Love as Violet
- Jacqueline Logan as Kitty Gray
- Ethelbert Knott as Dad Gray (credited as Adelbert Knott)
- Lydia Knott as Aunt Mehitabel
- Russell Powell as Colin MacClintock
- S. D. Wilcox as Marshall, White City
- Jim Hart as faro dealer

== Reception ==
The film received positive reviews and was commercially successful.

Grace Kingsley of the Los Angeles Times, Florence Lawrence of the Los Angeles Examiner, and Guy Price of the Los Angeles Herald praised Ray's performance, which was widely lauded as a comeback for the actor. Beery, Logan, and Love were also favorably reviewed.
