= Sandra (1924 film) =

1924 film directed by Arthur H. Sawyer

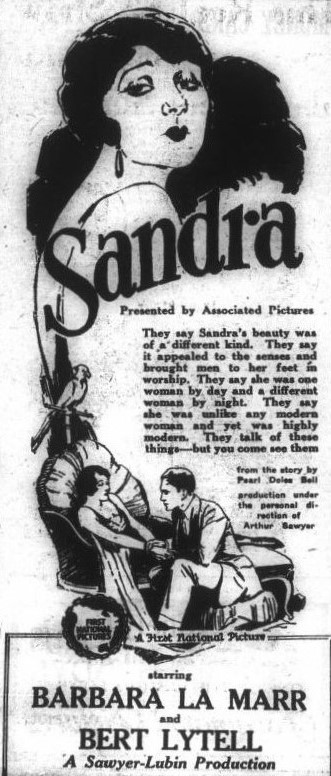
- Advertisement
- Directed by: Arthur H. Sawyer
- Written by: Winifred Dunn; Arthur H. Sawyer; Barbara La Marr (all uncredited)
- Based on: Sandra by Pearl Doles Bell
- Produced by: Arthur H. Sawyer; Herbert Lubin
- Starring: Barbara La Marr; Bert Lytell; Leila Hyams
- Cinematography: George Clarke
- Production company: Associated Pictures
- Distributed by: First National Pictures
- Release date: September 1924
- Running time: 8 reels
- Country: United States
- Language: Silent (English intertitles)

Sandra is a lost 1924 American silent drama film directed by Arthur H. Sawyer and starring Barbara La Marr and Bert Lytell. Based on the novel by Pearl Doles Bell, it was produced by Arthur H. Sawyer and Bernard Lubin's Associated Pictures for distribution by First National Pictures.

== Plot ==
As described in a review in a film magazine, Sandra Waring is a woman with two personalities. Her easy-going complacent husband David cannot understand her, for at times she is an affectionate home-loving wife and at other times she is exotic with a craving for adventure and romance. When David faces ruin because of the collapse of a building he has designed, Sandra saves him by making a bargain with Stephen Winslow, a connoisseur of women and at the same time finds the opportunity to follow her exotic side. She does not remain long with Winslow but visits Europe. Although she tastes romance and adventure and is acclaimed for her beauty and cleverness she is never satisfied. An affair with a Frenchman brings disillusionment when she discovered he is a crooked gambler and uses her for bait. Finally, she believes she has found happiness and true love with a bank president until he is arrested for embezzlement and it is revealed that he also has a wife. Returning home completely disillusioned, she believes that David has found happiness with Mait Stanley, one of her best friends, and decides to take her own life after confessing her failures to David. She leaves and wanders into a church that her husband built where David’s friend Rev. William J. Hapgood is minister. David, after he has searched in vain for his wife and come to his friend, the minister, for consolation, finally finds her at the church and takes her in his arms.

== Cast ==
- Barbara La Marr as Sandra Waring
- Bert Lytell as David Waring
- Leila Hyams as Mait Stanley
- Augustin Sweeney as Bob Stanley
- Maude Hill as Mrs. Stanley
- Edgar Nelson as Mr. Stanley
- Leon Gordon as Stephen Winslow
- Leslie Austin as Rev. William J. Hapgood
- Lillian Ten Eyck as Mimi
- Morgan Wallace as Francois Molyneaux
- Arthur Edmund Carewe as Henri La Flamme
- Helen Gardner as La Flamme's Wife
- Alice Weaver as Dancer
- Ethlyne Clair (uncredited)
- Downing Clarke (uncredited)

== Preservation ==
Sandra is currently presumed lost, though a trailer exists in the Library of Congress collection. In February of 2021, the film was cited by the National Film Preservation Board on their Lost U.S. Silent Feature Films list.
