= Her Elephant Man =

1920 film directed by Scott R. Dunlap

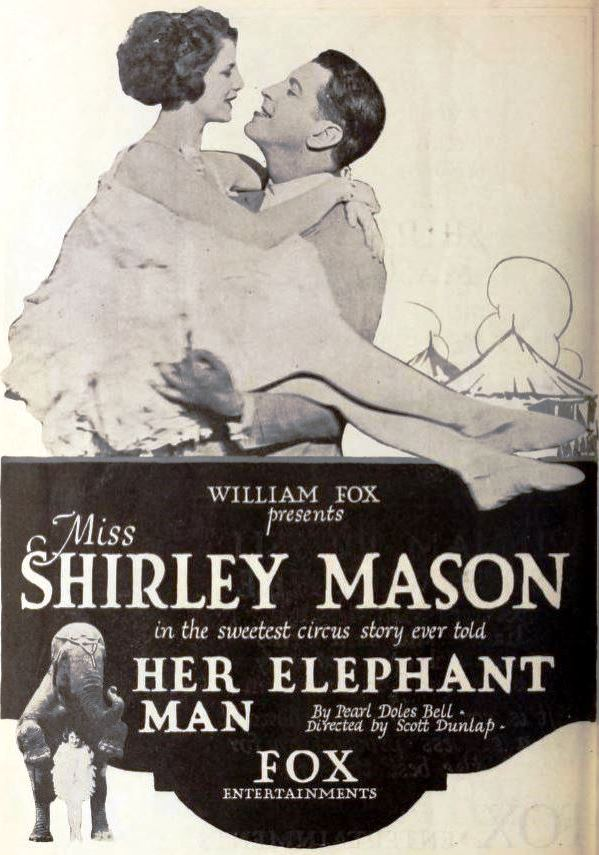
- Advertising of Her Elephant Man on page 10 of the February 14, 1920 Exhibitors Herald.
- Directed by: Scott R. Dunlap
- Written by: Isabel Johnston (scenario)
- Based on: Her Elephant Man: A Story of the Sawdust Ring by Pearl Doles Bell
- Starring: Shirley Mason; Alan Roscoe; Henry Hebert; Ardita Mellinina; Harry Todd
- Cinematography: George Schneiderman
- Production company: Fox Film Corporation
- Distributed by: Fox Film Corporation
- Release date: February 1920
- Running time: 5 reels
- Country: United States
- Languages: Silent film (English intertitles)

Her Elephant Man is a 1920 American silent drama film directed by Scott R. Dunlap and starring Shirley Mason, Alan Roscoe, Henry Hebert, Ardita Mellinina, and Harry Todd. It is based on the 1919 novel Her Elephant Man: A Story of the Sawdust Ring by Pearl Doles Bell. The film was released by Fox Film Corporation in February 1920.

== Cast ==
- Shirley Mason as Joan
- Alan Roscoe as Colonel Philip Dorset
- Henry Hebert as Blake
- Ardita Mellinina as The Bride
- Harry Todd as Jerimy
- Dorothy Lee as Trixie

== Preservation ==
The film is now considered lost.
