= George Schneiderman =

American cinematographer

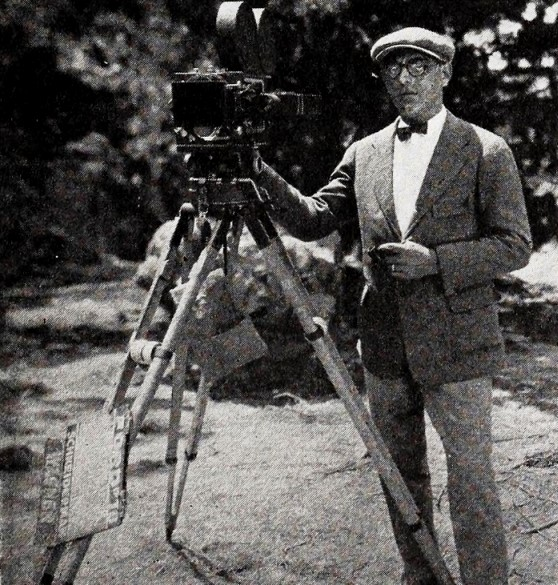
- From a 1925 magazine
- Born: September 20, 1894; New York City
- Died: November 19, 1964 (aged 70); Van Nuys, California
- Occupation: Cinematographer
- Years active: 1915–1940 (film)

George Schneiderman (September 20, 1894 – November 19, 1964) was an American cinematographer. He was employed on more than 80 productions during his career, and he is known for his work for the Fox Film Corporation.

== Partial filmography ==
- A Fool There Was (1915)
- A Tale of Two Cities (1917)
- Cleopatra (1917)
- The Great Love (1918)
- Vagabond Luck (1919)
- Her Elephant Man (1920)
- The Hell Ship (1920)
- Over the Hill to the Poorhouse (1920)
- Love's Harvest (1920)
- Molly and I (1920)
- The Little Wanderer (1920)
- Colorado Pluck (1921)
- Jackie (1921)
- Bare Knuckles (1921)
- Queenie (1921)
- Singing River (1921)
- Pawn Ticket 210 (1922)
- The Face on the Bar-Room Floor (1923)
- Cameo Kirby (1923)
- Man's Size (1923)
- The Iron Horse (1924)
- Kentucky Pride (1925)
- Thank You (1925)
- Lazybones (1925)
- The Shamrock Handicap (1926)
- The Blue Eagle (1926)
- 3 Bad Men (1926)
- Black Paradise (1926)
- Road House (1928)
- The Big Party (1930)
- Riders of the Purple Sage (1931)
- Charlie Chan Carries On (1931)
- Stepping Sisters (1932)
- Infernal Machine (1933)
- Walls of Gold (1933)
- Orient Express (1934)
- 52nd Street (1937)

== Bibliography ==
- Aubrey Solomon. The Fox Film Corporation, 1915–1935: A History and Filmography. McFarland, 2011.
