= Patsy (1921 film) =

1921 silent film

- Directed by: John McDermott
- Written by: John McDermott
- Based on: Patsy; Comedy Melodrama in Four Acts; 1914 play by Er Lawshe
- Produced by: Fred Swanton
- Starring: ZaSu Pitts; Marjorie Daw; Wallace Beery
- Cinematography: Harry Thorpe
- Production company: Fred Swanton Productions
- Distributed by: Truart Film Corporation; Woolf and Freedman Films (UK)
- Release date: February 1, 1921
- Running time: 50 minutes
- Country: United States
- Languages: Silent; English intertitles

Patsy is a 1921 American silent comedy film directed by John McDermott and starring Zasu Pitts, Marjorie Daw, and Wallace Beery.

== Cast ==
- ZaSu Pitts as Patsy
- Marjorie Daw as Margaret Vincent
- Wallace Beery as Gustave Ludermann
- John MacFarlane as Pops
- Tom Gallery as Bob Brooks
- Fanny Midgley as Mrs. Vincent
- Harry Todd as Tramp
- Milla Davenport as Matron
- Henry Fortson as Bones

== Bibliography ==
- Charles Stumpf. ZaSu Pitts: The Life and Career. McFarland, 2010.
