= Manhattan Madness (1916 film) =

1916 film by Allan Dwan

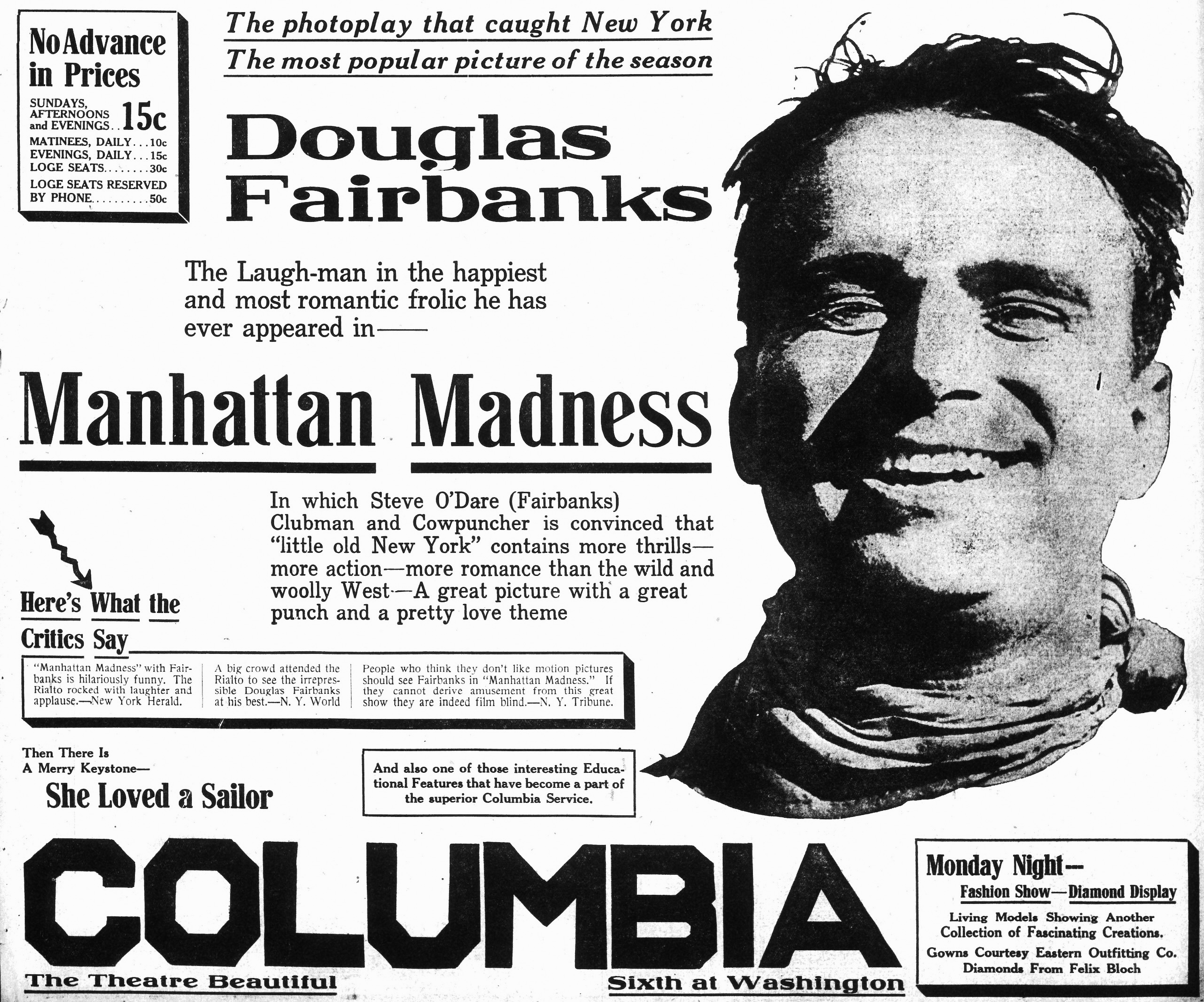
- Douglas Fairbanks
- Directed by: Allan Dwan
- Written by: Charles T. Dazey; Frank Dazey
- Produced by: Fine Arts Film Company
- Starring: Douglas Fairbanks
- Cinematography: Victor Fleming
- Distributed by: Triangle Film Corporation
- Release date: October 1, 1916
- Running time: 50 minutes
- Country: USA
- Language: Silent (English titles)

Manhattan Madness is a 1916 silent film comedy directed by Allan Dwan and starring Douglas Fairbanks. It was produced by Fine Arts Film Company and distributed by Triangle Film Corporation.

The film is preserved at George Eastman House and Museum of Modern Art.

== Cast ==
- Douglas Fairbanks - Steve O'Dare
- Jewel Carmen - The Girl
- George Beranger - The Butler
- Ruth Darling - The Maid
- Eugene Ormonde - Count Marinoff
- Macey Harlam - The Villain
- Warner Richmond - Jack Osborne
- John Richmond - Cupid Russell
- Albert MacQuarrie - The Nevada Chum (uncredited)

Manhattan Madness (1916)
