= Mitchell Dazey =

American politician

Mitchell Dazey (October 2, 1820 – September 10, 1896) was an American politician and farmer.

Dazey was born in Bourbon County, Kentucky. He moved with his parents to Illinois in 1828. Dazey operated the first steam flour mill in Illinois. He lived in Lima, Illinois, and was a farmer. Dazey served in the Illinois House of Representatives in 1889 and 1890 and in 1893 and 1894. He was a Democrat.

Dazey died at his home in Lima, Illinois. His son Charles Dazey was a playwright.
