= Pearl Doles Bell =

American novelist, silent film scenarist, and editor

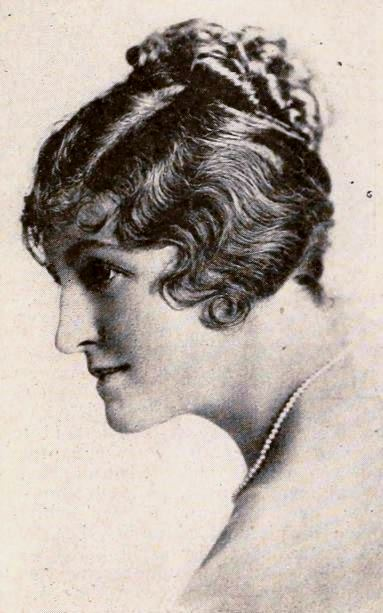
- Born: Pearl E. Doles; April 2, 1883; St. Joseph, Missouri
- Died: March 11, 1968 (aged 84); New York, New York
- Occupations: Novelist; silent film scenarist; radio script writer; editor
- Years active: 1914–1928
- Spouses: George Humphrey Bell (m. 1910) Gilbert E. Rubens (m. 1927–1960)

Pearl Doles Bell (April 2, 1883 – March 11, 1968) was an American novelist, film scenarist, radio script writer, and editor. During her career, she published eight novels and had numerous stories adapted into silent films. She was especially known for writing film stories for silent film star Shirley Mason.

== Early life ==
Pearl E. Doles was born to George W. Doles and Lettie Doles in St. Joseph, Missouri, on April 2, 1883. At the age of 12, Doles "went upon the stage as an elocutionist," according to the Exhibitors Herald, touring the country. She began her writing career at age 12 or 13, publishing poems in a St. Joseph newspaper. Her poems were soon reprinted in newspapers around the country.

Doles married George Humphrey Bell, a former Chicago businessman, on March 9, 1910, in Chicago, and added his last name to her own. The Bells lived in Brooklyn, where Pearl decorated their apartment with hand-painted frescoes, refashioned furniture, hand-embroidered hangings, and a garden. The couple traveled once a year to Florida on a yacht named "The Bells," where Pearl honed her skills as "an expert swimmer, a crack shot with a rifle, an expert canoeist, [and] a hardy hiker." On Monday, November 24, 1913, she made the front page of the New York Times for her "daring feat" of diving with sharks in Key West.

== Writing career ==
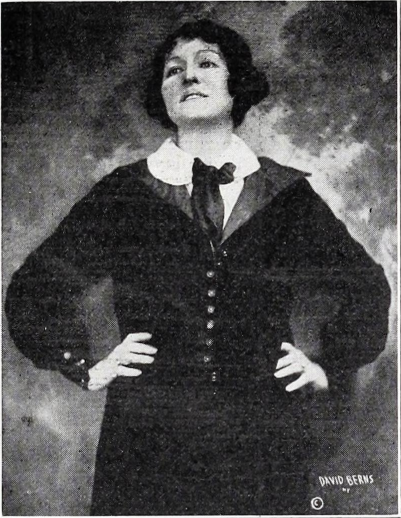
Pearl Doles Bell, photographed by David Berns, c. 1924

Bell incorporated her knowledge of boats and sailing into her first novel, Gloria Gray, Love Pirate, published in 1914. She also contributed an illustration for the frontispiece.

Bell served as the editor of Fashionable Dress, a fashion magazine, from about 1919 to 1922.

To research her third novel, Her Elephant Man: A Story of the Sawdust Ring, Bell traveled for six weeks with Ringling Brothers Circus. She sold the film rights to the novel to the Fox Film Corporation. In December 1919, the Exhibitors Herald announced that the film would be made starring new Fox star Shirley Mason.

Her Elephant Man was released in 1920, followed in the same year by Love's Harvest, adapted from Bell's 1915 novel His Harvest, and also starring Shirley Mason. In December, 1920, Moving Picture World announced that Mason was beginning production on her third Bell adaptation, Wing Toy. The film was based on Bell's unpublished short story "The Little Pagan", which she wrote specifically for Mason. Sources also reported that Bell was at work on an original scenario or series of screen stories for Mason to helm. Bell traveled to Los Angeles, along with her pet turtle Mike, in 1920 to meet Mason and discuss these original stories.

However, Mason did not star in Bell's next two adapted films, For Another Woman and Sandra, both released in 1924.

Motion Picture News reported in 1925 that Bell had sold the rights to her fourth novel, The Autocrat. The film was set to be made by Pinellas Films in St. Petersburg, Florida, with Raoul Everria producing.

Bell's sixth novel, The Love Link, about a flapper who saves her parents' rocky marriage with her antics, was listed as a "popular copyright" by the American News Trade Journal in 1926. First National Pictures had announced in a July 1925 advertisement in The Moving Picture World that they would adapt the novel, as well as a Bell short story titled "The Man She Bought" set to star Constance Talmadge. The latter film was set to go into production on February 13, 1925, directed by Sidney Franklin, and be released on November 29, 1925. Subsequent information about these projects is lacking.

Variety reported that Bell had instructed her lawyers to sue Famous Players–Lasky in October 1925, asserting that their film The Pony Express used her story without the rights.

Bell collaborated with dancer Billie Shaw to write the screen story "Little Lady, Inc."; the two sold the rights for the story to David Hartford Productions for $5000. According to the Exhibitors Herald, "Little Lady, Inc." was adapted for the screen by Sylvia Frances Seid under the title Rose of the Bowery. David Hartford Productions began camera work on the film in 1926, with Bertram Bracken directing; however, by the time the film was released in 1927, Bell, Shaw, and Seid's names were all absent from the credits.

== Later life and death ==
Pearl Doles Bell married Havana distiller and art collector Gilbert E. Rubens on October 12, 1927, in Brooklyn, New York. Rubens died in 1960, leaving Bell a widow for the final years of her life.

Bell died on Monday, March 11, 1968, in St. Luke's Hospital.

== Novels ==
- Gloria Gray, Love Pirate (Roberts & Company, 1914)
- His Harvest (John Lane Company, 1915)
- Her Elephant Man: A Story of the Sawdust Ring (Robert M. McBride & Company, 1919)
- The Autocrat (W. J. Watt & Co., 1922)
- Sandra (W. J. Watt & Co., 1924)
- The Love Link (W. J. Watt & Co., 1925)
- Slaves of Destiny (W. J. Watt & Co., 1926)
- Woman on Margin (1928)
- The First Lady (1932)

== Filmography ==
- Her Elephant Man, 1920 (adapted from the novel)
- Love's Harvest, 1920 (adapted from the novel His Harvest)
- Wing Toy, 1921 (from the unpublished story "The Little Pagan")
- For Another Woman, 1924 (from the story "Just Mary")
- Sandra (adapted from the novel)
