= Charles Dazey =

American writer and playwright

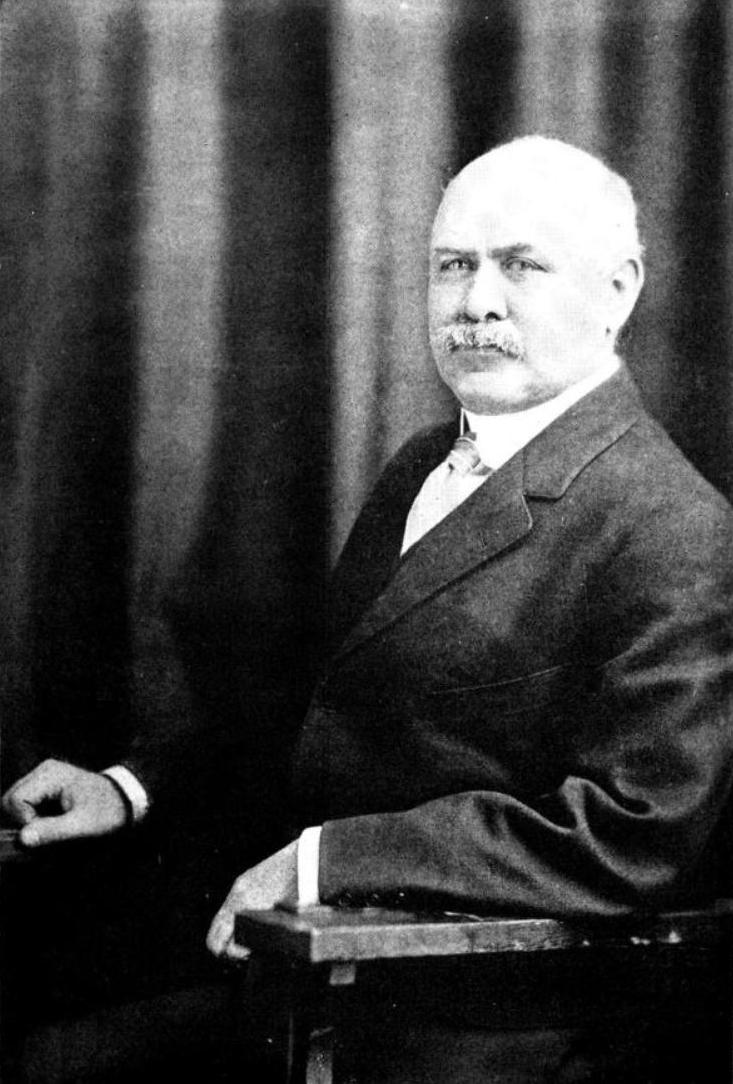
Charles Dazey

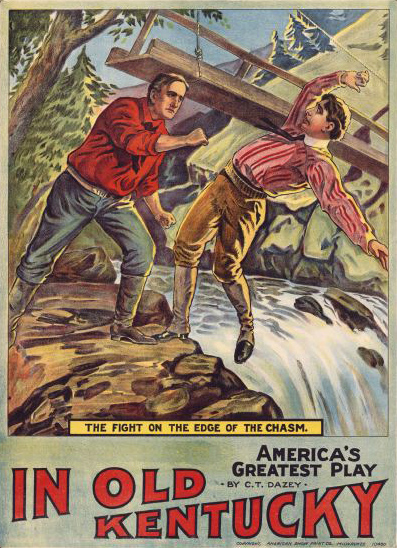
Color lithograph poster for "In Old Kentucky," 1893.

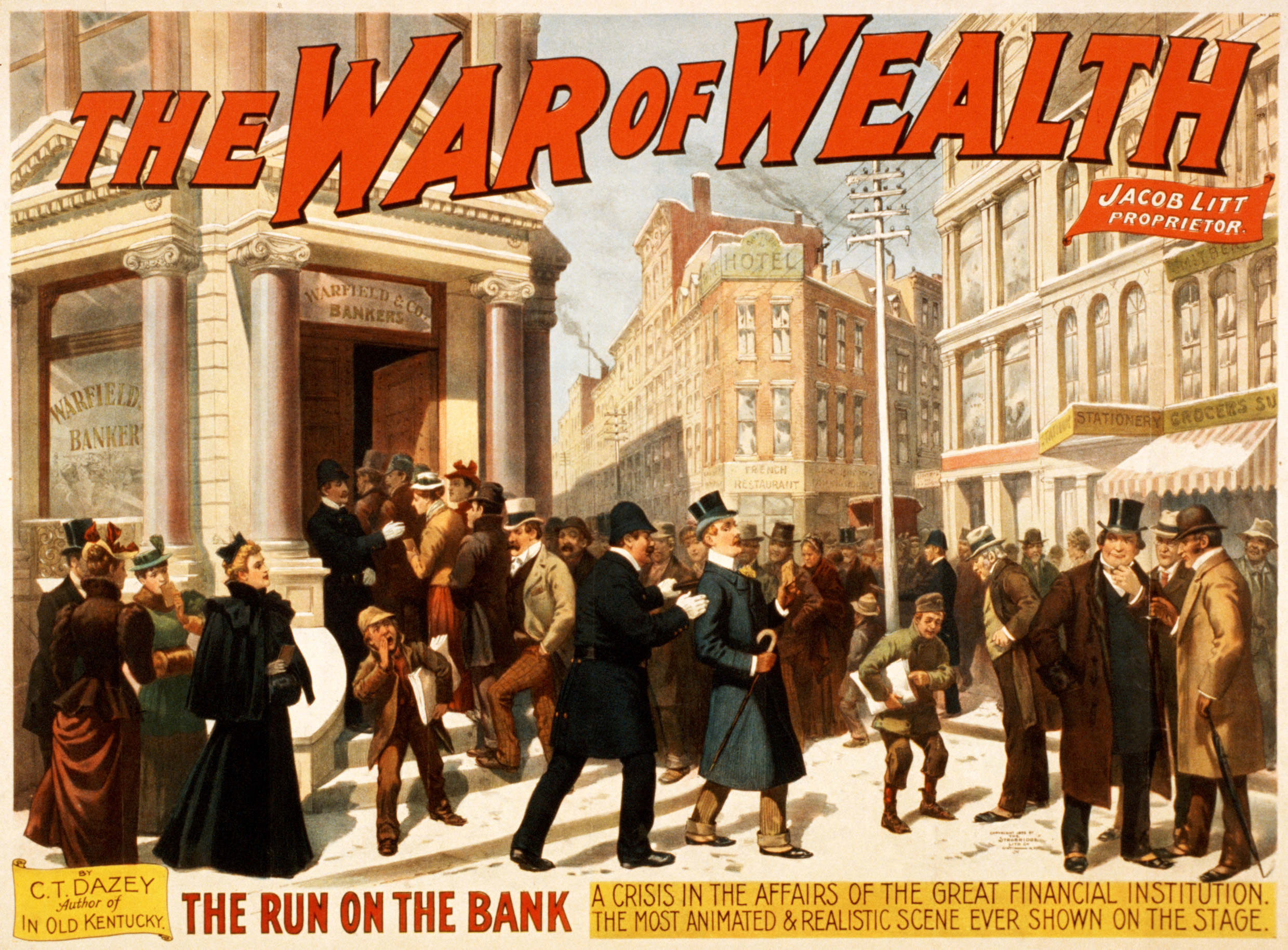
Dazey's 1896 Broadway melodrama The War of Wealth was inspired by the Panic of 1893.

Charles Turner Dazey (August 13, 1855 – February 9, 1938) was an American writer and playwright.

He was born in Lima, Illinois; attended the state university in Lexington, Kentucky; and graduated from Harvard University in 1881. He edited The Harvard Advocate and was elected poet of his class. While at college his poems were published in The Century Magazine. His comedietta Rustication was produced at the Boston Museum while he was a sophomore.

In 1892 Dazey wrote the libretto for War-Time Wedding, music by Oscar Weil of San Francisco, produced by The Bostonians with Henry Barnabee and Alice Nielsen. He wrote several plays for Kate Putnam, American King for James O'Neill and The Little Maverick for Maggie Mitchell. His greatest success, In Old Kentucky, was written for Jacob Litt. For over 26 years it had uninterrupted production in America. After writing for Broadway, he wrote for film including Manhattan Madness for Douglas Fairbanks, The Mysterious Client for Mrs. Vernon Castle and Shifting Sands for Gloria Swanson.

He was a member of the Lambs Club in New York. He married the actress Lucy Harding and died February 9, 1938, at age 82, in Quincy, Illinois. He donated the land used to build Dazey, North Dakota, which was named in his honor. His father was Mitchell Dazey who served in the Illinois General Assembly.

== Broadway shows written by Charles Dazey ==
- Humming Sam, based on the play In Old Kentucky, April 8, 1933 – April 8, 1933
- The Stranger, December 21, 1911 – January 1912
- The Three Lights, October 31, 1911 – November 1911
- The Girl from Texas, June 1, 1908 – [unknown]
- The American Lord, written with George Broadhurst, April 16, 1906 – May 1906
- Home Folks, December 26, 1904 – January 1905
- The Suburban, March 23, 1903
- The Tarrytown Widow, May 9, 1898 – [unknown]
- The War of Wealth, February 10, 1896 – [unknown]
