= The Claw =

The Claw may refer to:

== Characters ==
- The Claw (Dick Tracy), a fictional character in the Dick Tracy film serial Dick Tracy's Dilemma
- The Claw (Lev Gleason Publications), a fictional golden-age comic book villain
- The Claw, the main villain in the animated series Karate Kommandos

== Film ==
- The Claw (1918 film), an American silent film
- The Claw (1927 film), an American silent film

== Literature ==
- The Claw (novel), a 1911 novel by Cynthia Stockley
- The Claw, a 1981 novel by Norah Lofts
- The Claw, a 1983 novel by Ramsey Campbell
- The Claw, a 1995 novel in the Point Horror series by Carmen Adams

== Television ==
- "The Claw", Bluey series 1, episode 19 (2018)
- "The Claw", Dark Knight season 2, episode 4 (2001)
- "The Claw", Hong Kong Phooey episode 9a (1974)

== Other uses ==
- The Claw (Dreamworld), an Intamin Gyro Swing located at Dreamworld on the Gold Coast, Queensland, Australia
- "The Claw", a guitar instrumental composition by Jerry Reed
- The Claw (University of South Florida), a golf and cross country course
- White Memorial Fountain, nicknamed The Claw, a fountain at Stanford University that resembles a claw

== People ==
- Jorge Luis Mendoza Cárdenas, Mexican suspected drug lord nicknamed "la Garra" ("the Claw")
- Peter Clohessy (born 1966), Irish former rugby union footballer nicknamed "the Claw"

== See also ==
- Kawhi Leonard (born 1991), American basketball player nicknamed "the Klaw"
- Claw crane, a type of mechanical arcade game
- Claw (disambiguation)
