= Klaw =

Klaw or KLAW may refer to:

- Klaw (surname)
- Kawhi Leonard (born 1991), American basketball player nicknamed "the Klaw"
- Klaw (character), a fictional villain
- Klaw Theatre, a broadway theatre in Manhattan, New York City
- KLAW, American radio station
- Lawton-Fort Sill Regional Airport's ICAO code

== See also ==
- Claw (disambiguation)
