= Over the Border (1922 film) =

1922 film by Penrhyn Stanlaws

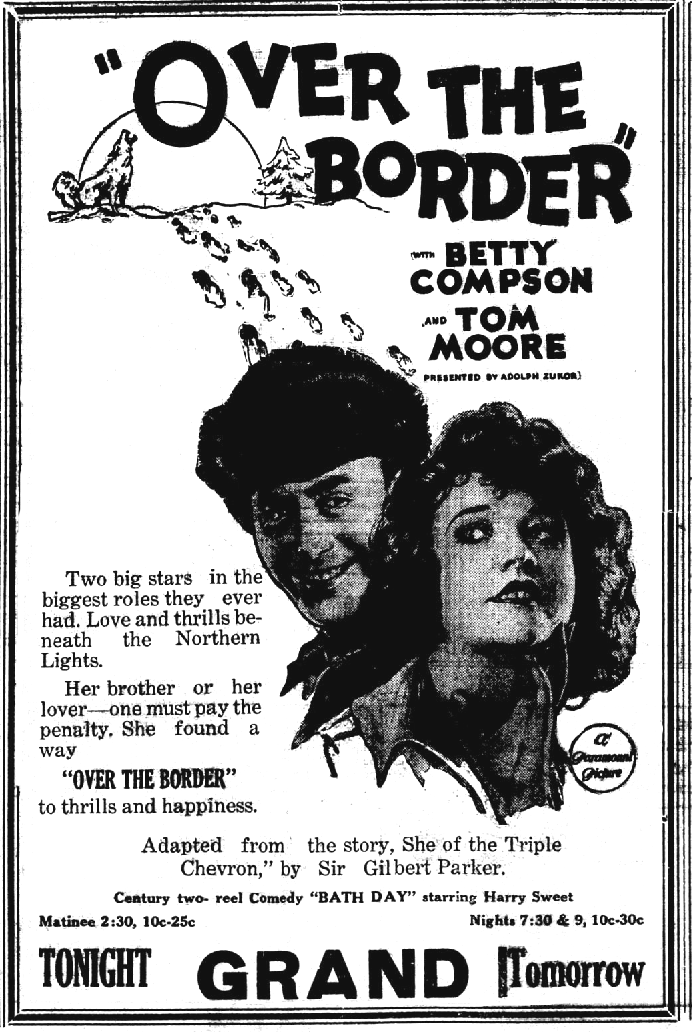
- Newspaper ad
- Directed by: Penrhyn Stanlaws
- Written by: Albert Shelby de Levino (scenario)
- Based on: She of the Triple Chevron by Gilbert Parker
- Produced by: Adolph Zukor; Jesse Lasky
- Starring: Betty Compson
- Cinematography: Paul Perry
- Distributed by: Paramount Pictures
- Release date: June 4, 1922
- Running time: 70 minutes; 7 reels
- Country: United States
- Language: Silent (English intertitles)

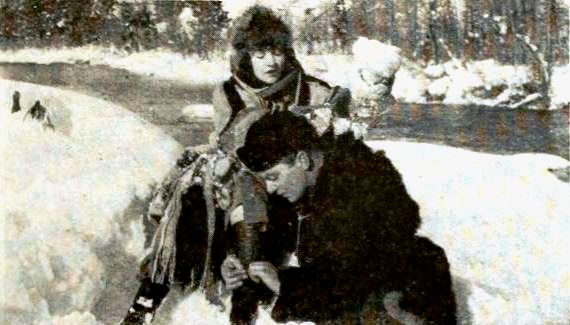
Still with Moore and Compson

Over The Border is an American silent drama film released by Paramount Pictures in 1922. It stars Betty Compson and Tom Moore in a story about "love and thrills beneath the northern lights". It was adapted from Sir Gilbert Parker's "She of the Triple Chevron".

== Plot ==
As described in a film magazine, Jen Galbraith, the daughter of a bootlegger on the Canadian border, and Sgt. Tom Flaherty of the North-West Mounted Police are in love, and the young woman often begs him to give up his job as a policeman. Tom has secretly turned in his resignation, but it is not yet in effect. While Jen is riding home through the snow one night she is mistaken for a spy of the moonshiners and is shot at by the police. She returns the fire and wounds an officer's horse. The police follow a trail that leads to her home with Tom arriving at the bootleggers camp at about the same time and seeking to divert suspicion from his girl. Her father and brother are arrested, and Jen turns from her lover in anger. The prisoners are freed on bail and plan to ship the liquor across the border into the United States and forfeit their bail. A spy is shot by Jen's brother and Sgt. Flaherty is sent to follow the slayer through a blizzard. Stopping at Jen's home, he is drugged by her father, but Jen carries Tom's sealed orders to the headquarters post. Tom follows and pretends that he has the authority to take the prisoner back with him. With his commission now expired, he tricks his former fellow officers and aids Jen's brother to escape. This brings about a reconciliation between Tom and Jen.

== Cast ==
- Betty Compson as Jen Galbraith
- Tom Moore as Sgt. Tom Flaherty
- J. Farrell MacDonald as Peter Galbraith
- Casson Ferguson as Val Galbraith
- Sidney D'Albrook as Snow Devil
- Lee Shumway as Cpl. Byng
- Jean De Briac as Pretty Pierre
- Ed Brady as Inspector Jules
- Joe Ray as Borden

== Preservation ==
Over the Border is currently presumed lost. In February of 2021, the film was cited by the National Film Preservation Board on their Lost U.S. Silent Feature Films list.
