= Claw (disambiguation) =

A claw is a sharp growth at the end of a toe or finger.

Claw or Claws may also refer to:

== Arts and entertainment ==
=== Fictional entities ===
- Claw (comics), several unrelated characters
- C.L.A.W., a fictional weapon in the G.I. Joe universe
- Claw the Unconquered, a sword and sorcery character from DC Comics
- Doctor Claw, the main villain of the animated television show Inspector Gadget

=== Games ===
- Claw (computer game), a 1997 computer game from Monolith Productions
- Claw, a name frequently given to Street Fighter character Vega

=== Literature ===
- Claw, a 1994 novel by Ken Eulo
- The Claw (novel), a 1911 novel by Cynthia Stockley
- The Claw, a 1981 novel by Norah Lofts
- The Claw, a 1983 novel by Ramsey Campbell
- The Claw, a 1995 novel in the Point Horror series by Carmen Adams
- Claws, a 2003 novel by Will Weaver
- Claws, a 2006 novel by Dan Greenburg
- Claw the Giant Monkey, a 2008 novel in the Beast Quest series by Adam Blade

=== Music ===
- "Claw", a song by the British metal band Motörhead from their album Orgasmatron (1986)
- "Claws" (song), a song by English singer Charli XCX
- C-L-A-W-S, an album by Gospel Claws

=== Television ===
==== Episodes ====
- "Claws", Johnny Bravo season 2, episode 4a (1999)
- "Claws", Odd Job Jack season 3, episode 11 (2006)
- "Claws", Monster Allergy season 1, episode 15 (2007)
- "Claws", Natural World series 18, episode 15 (2000)
- "Claws", The Bionic Woman season 1, episode 5 (1976)
- "Claws", The Shak season 3, episode 39 (2007)
- "Claws", Wicked! episode 14 (1999)
- "Claws", Matlock episode 7 (2024)

==== Shows ====
- Claws (TV series), a 2017 American TV series

=== Other uses in arts and entertainment ===
- Claw (juggling) a ball juggling trick
- Claws (film), a 1977 American horror-thriller film
- Claws (play), a 1916 play by Sophie Treadwell

== Military ==
- Operation Claw, a joint Swedish–American operation, with Norwegian support, at the end of World War II
- Operation Claw (2019–2020), a cross-border military operation undertaken by the Turkish Armed Forces in Iraq's autonomous Kurdistan Region
- Centre for Land Warfare Studies (CLAWS), an Indian think tank

== Science, technology, and mathematics ==
=== Biology and ecology ===
- Chela (organ), a pincerlike organ terminating certain limbs of some arthropods like crabs
- Claw, in botany, the narrowed, stalk-like, basal part of a petal, sepal, or bract
- "Claws", the nickname given to the Baryonyx dinosaur find made in a clay pit in Surrey
- CLAW hypothesis, a feedback loop between the climate and oceanic ecosystems

=== Other uses in science, technology, and mathematics ===
- Claw (graph theory), in mathematics a complete bipartite graph $K_{1,3}$
- CLAWS (linguistics), a program that performs part-of-speech tagging
- Claws Mail, a GTK+-based e-mail client and news client for Unix-like systems
- MSI Claw A1M, a handheld gaming computer released in 2024

== Other uses ==
- Shawna Ann Claw, Diné politician
- Baltimore Claws, a short-lived American basketball team
- Clothing, Laundry and Allied Workers Union of Aotearoa, a trade union in New Zealand
- Comics Literacy Awareness ("CLAw"), a UK literacy charity

== See also ==
- The Claw (disambiguation)
- Claw beaker, a type of drinking vessel used in the Dark Ages in Europe
- Claw chisel or tool, used for stone carving
- Claw hammer, a common carpentry tool
- Claw of Archimedes, a weapon designed by Archimedes to destroy attacking ships
- Klaw (disambiguation)
