= Society Secrets =

1921 film directed by Leo McCarey

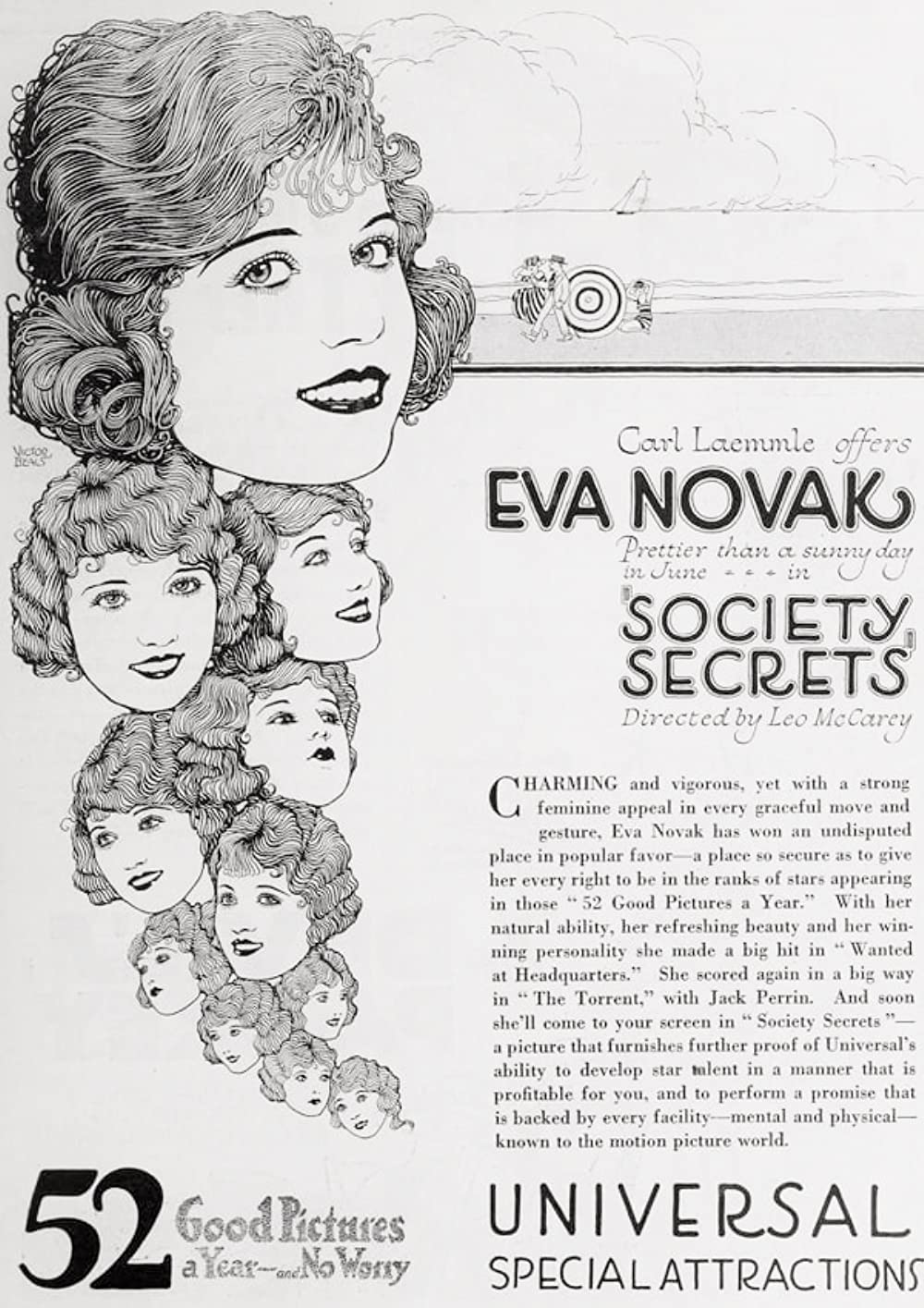
- Directed by: Leo McCarey
- Screenplay by: Douglas Doty (scenario)
- Story by: Helen Christine Bennett
- Produced by: Carl Laemmle
- Starring: Eva Novak; Gertrude Claire; George Verrell
- Cinematography: William E. Fildew
- Production company: Universal Film Manufacturing Co.
- Release date: February 1921 (US)
- Running time: 5 reels
- Country: United States
- Language: English

Society Secrets is a 1921 American silent satire film, directed by Leo McCarey. It stars Eva Novak, Gertrude Claire, and George Verrell, and was released in February 1921. It marked McCarey's directorial debut. McCarey didn't make a further feature film for eight years as he concentrated on writing and directing shorts.

== Plot ==
No record of the scenario for Society Secrets to date has been discovered. Biographers Gary Hooper and Leland Poague report that “nothing beyond the production credits has survived” with respect to this lost film. The American Film Institute, however, characterizes the Society Secrets as a “satire,” but provides no plot summary.

== Cast ==
- Eva Novak as Louise
- Gertrude Claire as Mrs. Kerran
- George Verrell as Amos Kerran
- Clarissa Selwynne as Aunt
- William Buckley as Arthur
- Ethel Ritchie as Maybelle
- Lee Shumway as George
- Carl Stockdale as Squire
- Lucy Donohue as Squire's wife

== Background ==
McCarey, age 20, was hired by Universal Studios in 1918 after studying law at the University of California. Working in “menial” jobs at Universal, he was assigned to work serve as an assistant to director Tod Browning, learning “the techniques of film directing and scenario construction.” After completing his apprenticeship on pictures including The Virgin of Stamboul (1920) and Outside the Law (1921), McCarey was permitted to direct his first film: Society Secrets.

== Reception ==
Biographers Gary Hooper and Leland Poague write:

It may be the case that the film was so bad (as McCarey admits) that it was never put into general release; if it was, it wasn’t considered worthy enough to generate any response in The New York Times...

== Sources ==
- Harrill, Paul. 2002. Leo McCarey. Senses of Cinema, Great Directors Issue 23, December, 2002 https://www.sensesofcinema.com/2002/great-directors/mccarey/ Retrieved 3 April 2024.
- Hooper, Gary and Poague, Leland. 1980. Leo McCarey Filmography, in The Hollywood Professionals: Wilder and McCarey, Volume 7. The Tanvity Press, A. S. Barnes and Company, Inc, San Diego, California. pp. 295–314 ISBN 0-498-02181-5
- Poague, Leland. 1980. The Hollywood Professionals: Wilder and McCarey, Volume 7. The Tanvity Press, A. S. Barnes and Company, Inc, San Diego, California. ISBN 0498-02181-5
- Silver, Charles. 2012. "A Leo McCarey Program." Inside/Out: Moma, October 5, 2010. https://www.moma.org/explore/inside_out/2010/10/05/a-leo-mccarey-program/ Retrieved 6 April 2024.
