= The House That Jazz Built =

1921 film

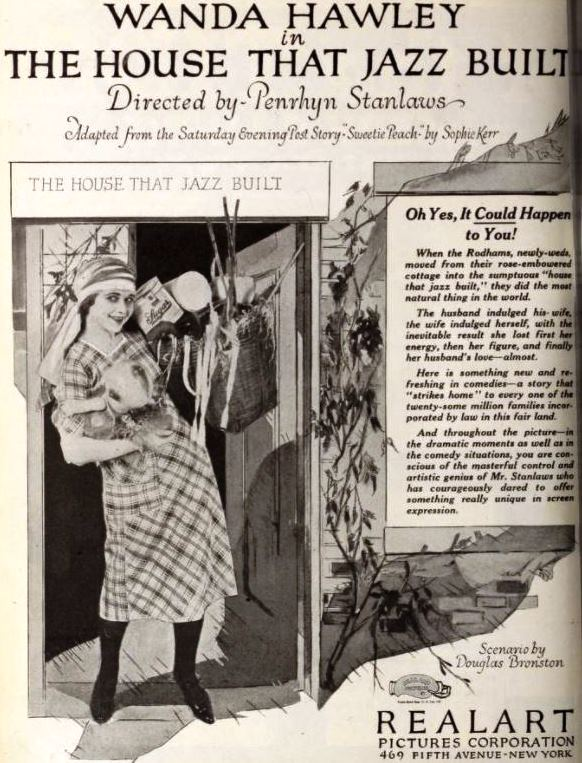
- Directed by: Penrhyn Stanlaws
- Screenplay by: Douglas Bronston
- Based on: Sweetie Peachie by Sophie Kerr
- Starring: Wanda Hawley; Forrest Stanley; Gladys George; Helen Lynch; Clarence Geldart; Helen Dunbar
- Cinematography: Paul P. Perry
- Production company: Realart Pictures Corporation
- Distributed by: Realart Pictures Corporation
- Release date: April 1921
- Running time: 60 minutes
- Country: United States
- Language: English

The House That Jazz Built is a 1921 American drama film directed by Penrhyn Stanlaws and written by Douglas Bronston. The film stars Wanda Hawley, Forrest Stanley, Gladys George, Helen Lynch, Clarence Geldart and Helen Dunbar. The film was released in April 1921, by Realart Pictures Corporation.

== Cast ==
- Wanda Hawley as Cora Rodham
- Forrest Stanley as Frank Rodham
- Gladys George as Lila Drake
- Helen Lynch as Kitty Estabrook
- Clarence Geldart as Mr. Estabrook
- Helen Dunbar as Mrs. Drake
- Robert Bolder as Mr. Foster
