= Penrhyn Stanlaws =

American film director

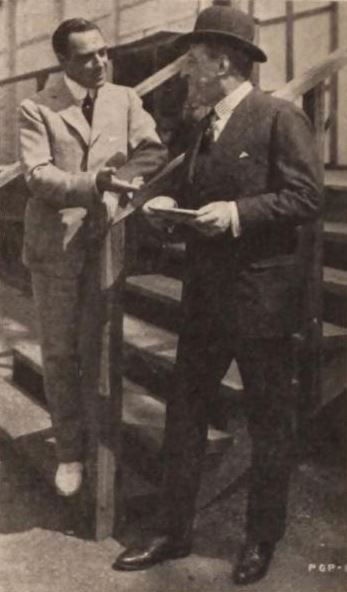
Talking to Joseph Kilgour on the set of At the End of the World

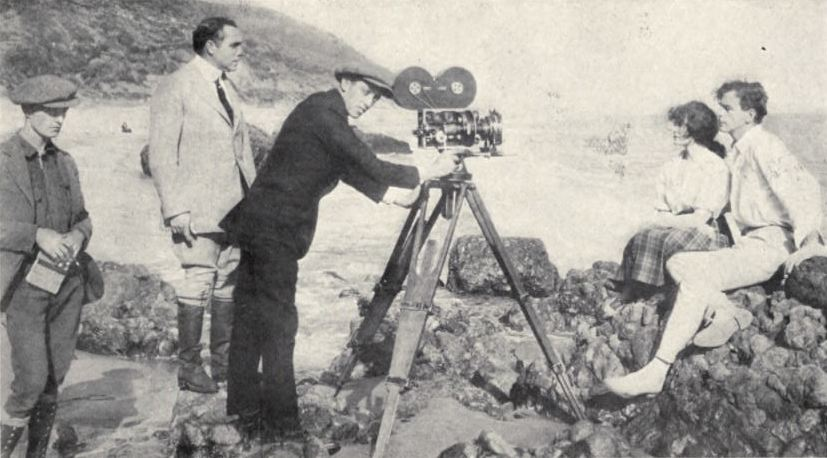
Penrhyn Stanlaws behind the cinematographer directing At the End of the World (1921)

Penrhyn Stanley Adamson, known as Penrhyn Stanlaws, (March 19, 1877 – May 20, 1957) was a cover artist and film director. Sydney Adamson, who also became an illustrator, was his older brother.

== Career ==
He was born in Dundee, Scotland.

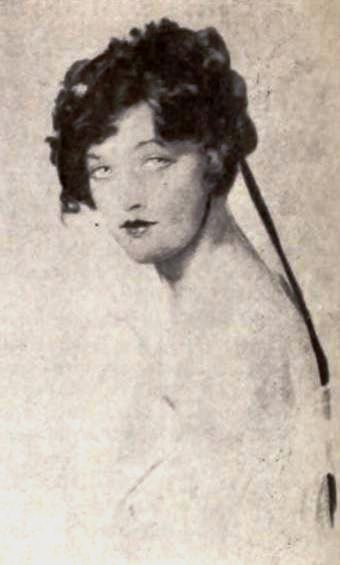
Sketch of Marion Davies

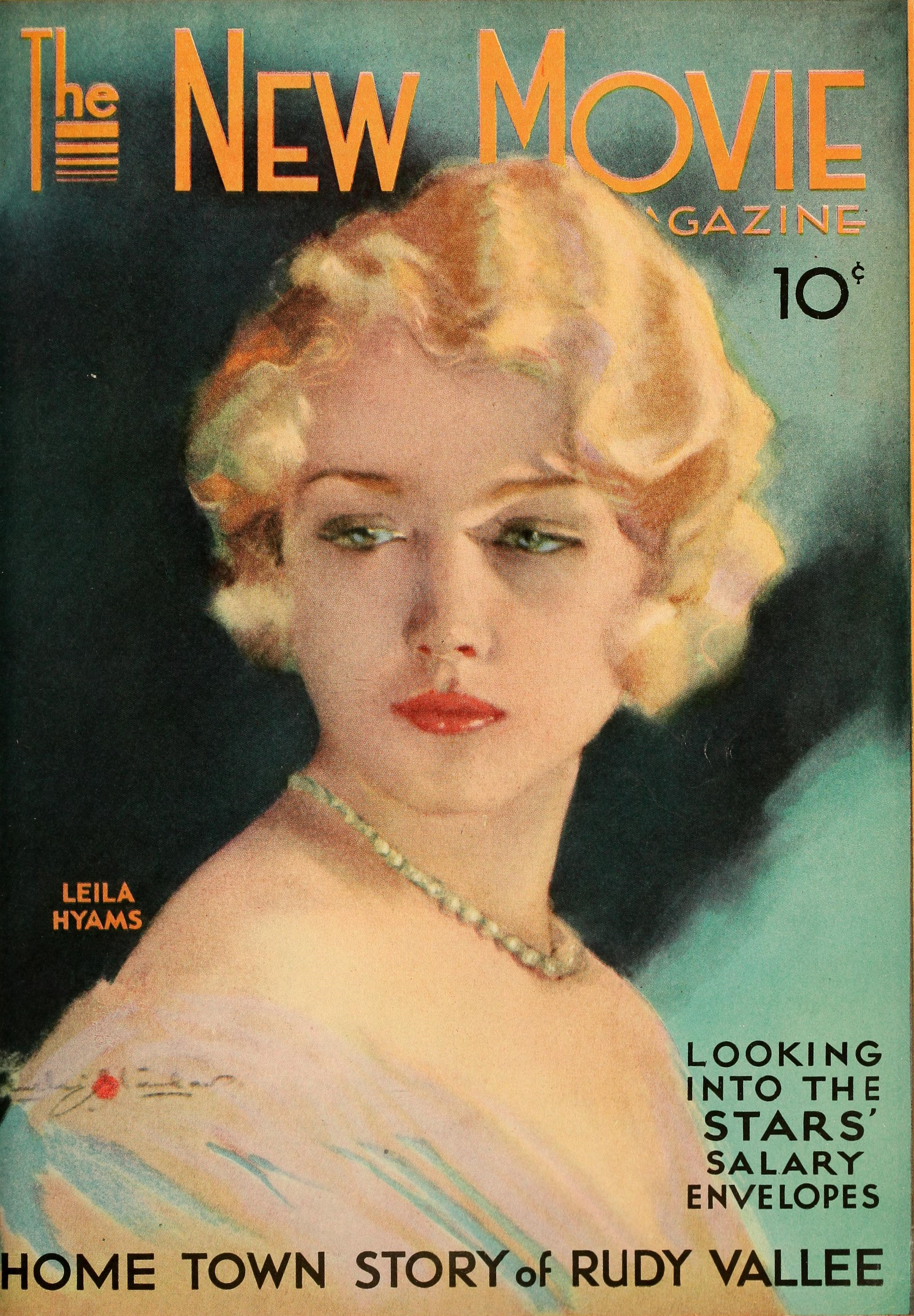
Leila Hyams magazine cover illustration

A successful cover artist, he picked Anna Q. Nilsson to become one of his models. He selected female models who toured by automobile to promote Liberty Loans.

Stanlaws organized a syndicate to build the Hotel des Artistes at 1 West 67th with a large penthouse studio. He also planned a resort in Port Washington on Long Island but it was never built.

He was a fan of the looks of Madge Bellamy.

== Gallery ==
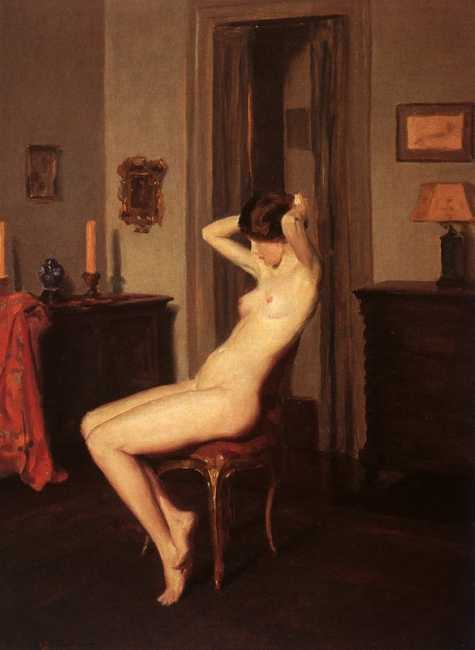
Olive Thomas nude

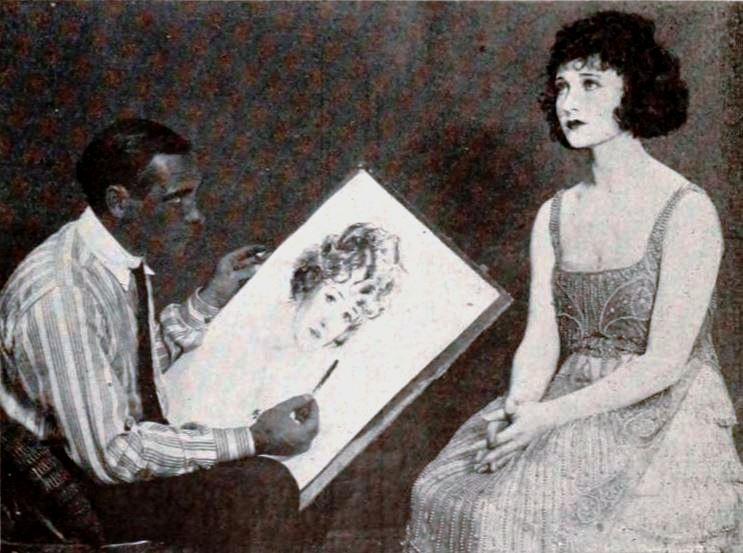
Penrhyn sketching Betty Compson

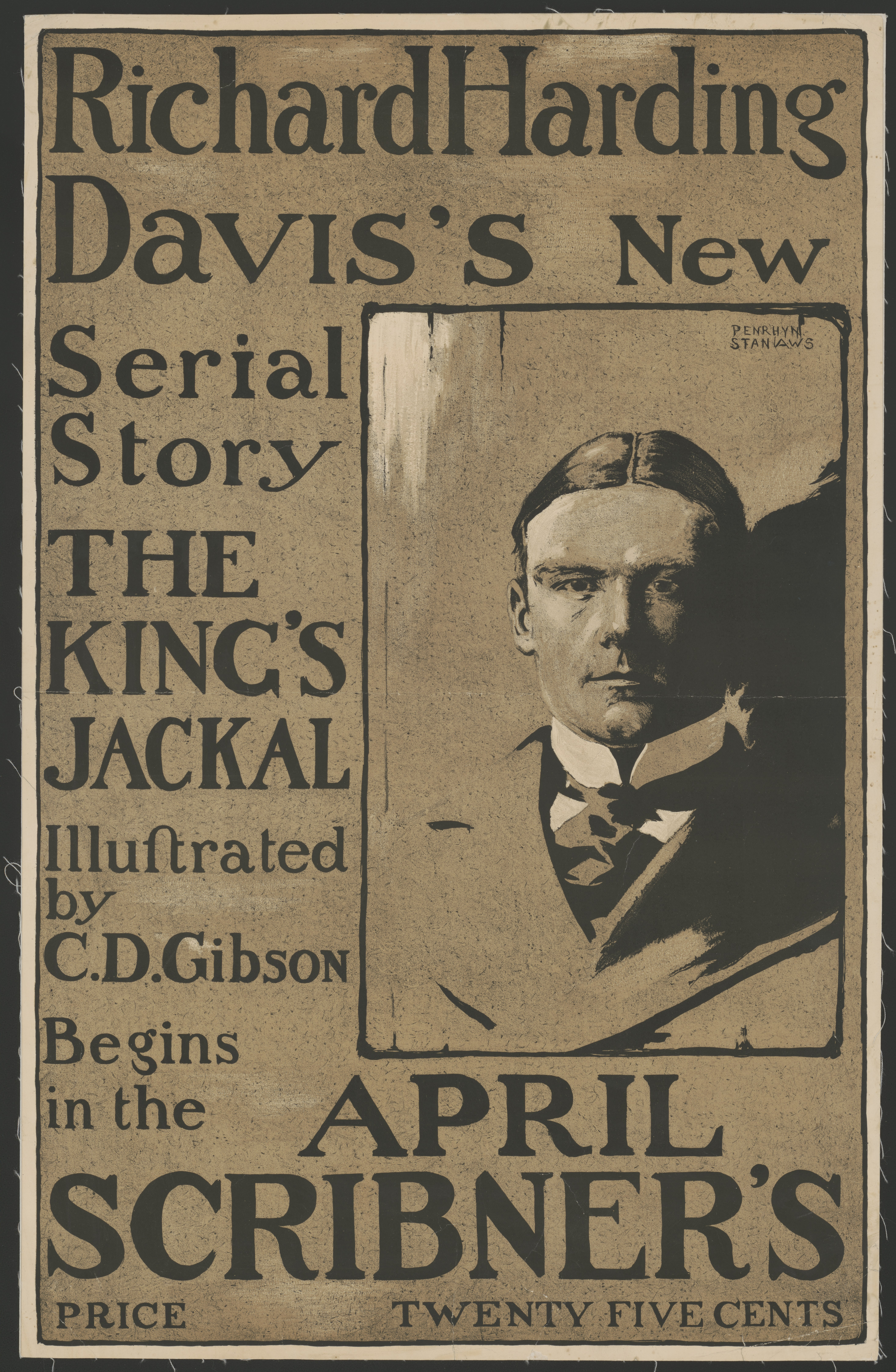
Cover art for Richard Harding Davis' "The King's Jackal" (1898)

== Filmography ==
- The House That Jazz Built (1921)
- At the End of the World (1921)
- The Little Minister (1921 film)
- Singed Wings (1922)
- The Law and the Woman (1922)
- Pink Gods (1922)
