= Williams process =

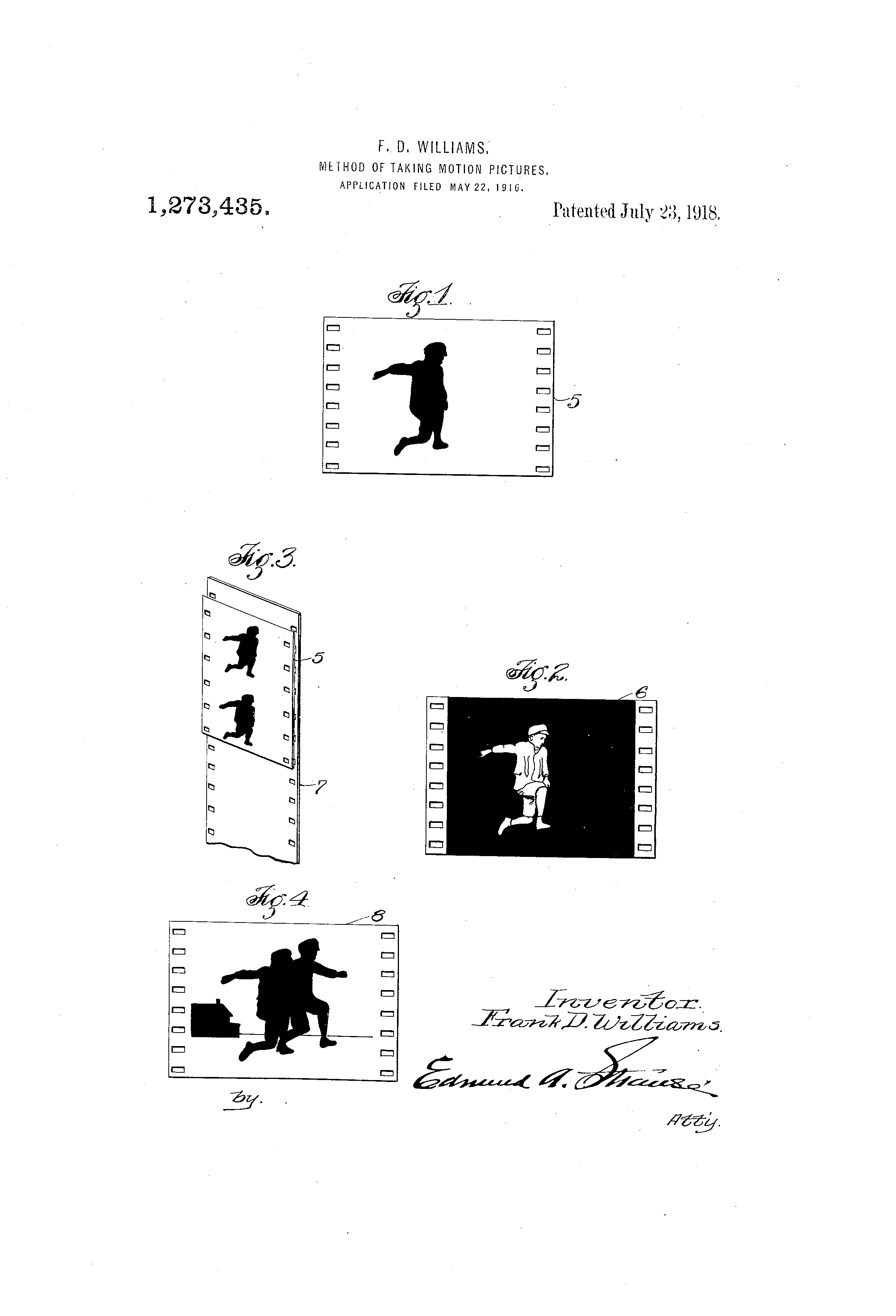
Frank D. William's patent. In it, we see the different stages of the Williams process.

The Williams process or Williams double matting process is a matte creation technique patented by the American cinematographer Frank D. Williams in 1918. Unlike prior matte techniques, it allowed for the integration of the actors' movements with previously shot backgrounds.

Due to this invention, Williams was able to found his own film lab, the Frank Williams Studio or Frank Williams Laboratories, devoted to the creation of all sorts of special effects (not just the Williams process) and where key figures of the special effects industry such as John P. Fulton worked.

== Origin ==
In 1912 Frank Williams began working on his future invention under precarious conditions: he alternated periods of time working as a cameraman and saving money with others dedicated to working on his project, usually in the bathroom of wherever he was living in at the moment. His first attempt to use the William process was that same year, while he worked as a cameraman for the director Mack Sennett, but he did not succeed. The problem lay in the cameras and printers of the time as well as the film available, which made it impossible for it to work. However, Williams kept at it, and in 1917 he got help from the producer Adolph Zukor, who allowed Williams to work in his lab. Despite everything, the problems he had encountered in 1912 had not been solved and he failed again.

It was not until 1922, during the production of Wild Honey, that he succeeded thanks to the improvement of film quality and the use of tripods and a special printing machine. This printer, that Williams built himself, was accurate to a ten thousandth of an inch and, according to the plans, cost 18,000 dollars.

== How it works ==
The Williams process relies on the properties of film. Firstly, the actors were filmed in front of a black background—although white or blue backgrounds were used later—and that was printed on high contrast film several times until a copy known as the holdout matte was achieved, which showed the black silhouette of the actors over a completely white background. That copy was inverted to make the cover matte, with the background black and the foreground white. Upon integrating the holdout matte and the desired background, the image was printed upon the white parts of the film while keeping the black silhouette untouched. Then, the original film was united with the new material and, using the cover matte, it was printed upon the white parts, the white silhouette, to achieve the final copy.

For a long time, this was the only method available for creating moving mattes; but it presented some issues. The number of copies that had to be made caused a very difficult to deal with halo effect. Moreover, though the process was suitable for colour films, the results were not very convincing in black and white films.

== Use ==
This technique was used for the first time in 1922 in Wild Honey with the help of Universal's art director Elmer Sheeley. It was also used in F.W. Murnau's Sunrise: A Song of Two Humans in 1927. Later, due to its popularization, the Williams process was also used in films such as The Lost World, King Kong, Ben Hur and The Invisible Man, where it was of particular importance.

=== The Invisible Man ===
The Invisible Man, directed in 1933 by James Whale and based on a novel of the same name by H.G. Wells, raised an important challenge for special effects specialists: making someone invisible. A great team was assembled to carry out this task, headed by John P. Fulton, chief of Paramount's special effects department and formerly mentored by Frank Williams, who also worked in this film. In order to make Claude Rains, the main actor, invisible, the Williams process was used along with stop-motion and wires. Additionally, over 64,000 frames were manually edited in post-production to get rid of any telling signs.

A year after the premiere, John P. Fulton wrote this about the production of the film for American Cinematographer:

We used a completely black set—walled and floored with black velvet, to be as nearly non-reflective as possible. Our actor was garbed from head to foot in black velvet tights, with black gloves, and a black headpiece rather like a diver's helmet. Over this, he wore whatever clothes might be required. This gave us a picture of the unsupported clothes, moving around on a dead black field. From this negative, we made a print, and a duplicate negative, which we intensified to serve as mattes for printing. Then, with an ordinary printer, we proceeded to make our composite: first we printed from the positive of the background and normal action, using the intensified, negative matte to mask off the area where our invisible man's clothing was to move. Then we printed again, using the positive matte to shield the already printed area, and printing in the moving clothes from our "trick" negative.

In other words, the leading actor and the background were covered in a black anti-reflective material—velvet—and over it Rains wore the character's clothing; this recording was to be combined with the background, filmed individually. However, a holdout matte (a high contrast copy with the background and actor's body all in black and the clothes in white) had to be made first and inverted in order to get the cover matte. Then the holdout matte was combined with the regular film—which showed the background, objects or other actors—so it was printed on the white parts, the background and the velvet-covered Claude Rains. Lastly, to get the final version of the scene, the cover matte was used to protect the already printed parts of the celluloid so that only the character's clothes could be printed.

== Evolution ==
Though the Williams process surpassed by far Norman Dawn's glass mattes, a better technique was found: the Dunning process or Dunning-Pomeroy Self Matting Process, which was patented in 1927 by C. Dodge Dunning.

The Dunning process was based on panchromatic film's properties, which produces black and white pictures despite being sensible to all the colours. It was shot in a particular way: the background had to be blue, while yellow-orange lights lighted the foreground elements. Due to colour separation, a matte appeared naturally in the specially lit areas. Using a bi-pack camera or an optical printer, it was then combined with the shot of the desired background, which was toned to be the same yellow-orange colour.

Later, rear projection (also known as process shooting) was used. Although the method already existed before the thirties, it was not until then that it was systematized thanks to technical improvements of the time. The first rear projection method was an animation technique patented by Willis O'Brien in 1933 based on the frame-by-frame projection of the previously shot images onto glass or a translucent screen while the animation was carried out on the foreground. This was perfected for the 1933's film King Kong with the help of Sidney Saunders—head of RKO's paint department, who built a special screen made of cellulose to avoid flaws—and Linwood Dunn—cocreator of the Acme-Dunn optical printer.

Another variant of the rear projection technique came to be with the boom of sound films and the consequent need to film in studios. Similarly to the other approaches, the actors were to be filmed while the previously filmed background was projected onto a screen. Until then, this had been impossible due to the lack of powerful projectors that could be coordinated with cameras in order to avoid projection problems. A big contribution was the three-headed projector, invented by Farciot Edouart—head of the transparencies department and, later, of special effects at Paramount—and established in the late thirties.

Finally, the last invention based on the Williams process was the sodium vapour process or yellow screen, developed by Petro Vlahos for Disney's Mary Poppins and perfected by Ub Iwerks. For this technique the actors had to be positioned in front of a white background lit by sodium-vapour lamps, which produce a very characteristic wavelength (of about 589.3 nm). Using a special prism, the filmed material was separated so that the actor's actions were printed onto black and white film and a matte was created, which had to be inverted before uniting everything. However, given that Disney was the sole owner of the material necessary (the prism, lights, trained technicians, etc.) to carry out this process and that in and of itself the sodium vapour process was tedious and complex, it ended up being replaced by refined blue screen technology.
