= Gertrude Claire =

American actress

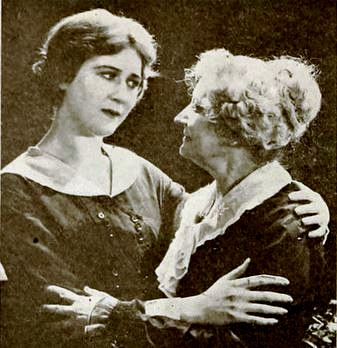
- Claire (right) in The Petal on the Current (1919)
- Born: July 16, 1852; Chicago, Illinois, U.S.
- Died: April 28, 1928 (aged 75); Los Angeles, California, U.S.
- Occupation: Actress
- Years active: 1910–1928

Gertrude Claire (July 16, 1852 – April 28, 1928) was an actress of the American stage and Hollywood silent motion pictures.

== Biography ==
Claire was born in Chicago, Illinois, and began appearing onstage at the age of 16. She played minor roles in New York City. In the coming years she began to play leads. The actors of note she appeared with included John Drew Jr., Edwin Booth, and Richard Mansfield.

She began work in films while the industry was still based in New York. Then she moved to Hollywood, where she was part of the first motion picture playing company organized there. Claire had roles in 123 films beginning in 1910 and continuing until 1928. Her last appearance in movies was in the Clara Bow feature film Red Hair (1928).

On April 28, 1928, Claire died at her home in Hollywood, aged 76.

== Selected filmography ==
- The Two Brothers (1910)
- Ramona (1910)
- The Battle of Gettysburg (1913)
- The Aryan (1916)
- The Apostle of Vengeance (1916)
- Peggy (1916)
- The Crab (1917)
- Wooden Shoes (1917)
- Madcap Madge (1917)
- The Mother Instinct (1917)
- Happiness (1917)
- 'Blue Blazes' Rawden (1918)
- When Do We Eat? (1918)
- Hard Boiled (1919)
- Little Comrade (1919)
- The Crimson Gardenia (1919)
- The Petal on the Current (1919)
- Stepping Out (1919)
- Widow by Proxy (1919)
- Jinx (1919)
- Blind Man's Eyes (1919)
- Romance and Arabella (1919)
- Dollar for Dollar (1920)
- The Cradle of Courage (1920)
- Her Beloved Villain (1920)
- The Money Changers (1920)
- The Forbidden Thing (1920)
- Madame Peacock (1920)
- Greater Than Love (1921)
- The Sin of Martha Queed (1921)
- The Fox (1921)
- The Invisible Power (1921)
- Hail the Woman (1921)
- Society Secrets (1921)
- The Adventures of Robinson Crusoe (1922)
- Forget Me Not (1922)
- Human Hearts (1922)
- Oliver Twist (1922)
- Environment (1922)
- The Super-Sex (1922)
- Ridin' Wild (1922)
- Double Dealing (1923)
- Itching Palms (1923)
- Ladies to Board (1924)
- The Heart Bandit (1924)
- Daughters of Today (1924)
- Wine of Youth (1924)
- The Wedding Song (1925)
- His Majesty, Bunker Bean (1925)
- Tumbleweeds (1925)
- Her Sister from Paris (1925)
- Romance Road (1925)
- The Storm Breaker (1925)
- The Little Irish Girl (1926)
