= Cynthia Stockley =

South African novelist

- Born: Lilian Julian Webb; 7 July 1873; Bloemfontein, Orange Free State
- Died: 15 January 1936 (aged 62); Kensington, England
- Education: St. Michael's School, Bloemfontein
- Occupation: Writer
- Spouses: Philip Stockley; Joseph Byrne; Harold Pelham Browne
- Children: Dorothy; Patrick
- Writing career
- Notable works: Poppy the Story of a South African Girl, Ponjola

Cynthia Stockley (7 July 1873 – 15 January 1936) was a South African-Rhodesian novelist known for her romance novels usually set in Rhodesia (now Zimbabwe) and South Africa. Her name before her marriage was Lilian Julian Webb. Cynthia was an adopted name.

== Biography ==
Stockley was born in Bloemfontein, Orange Free State. Her mother, Mary Ann Webb (Corbett), emigrated from County Clare in Ireland at the age of 18, in 1859, whilst her father, Abel Arthur Webb, arrived from Northamptonshire, England, in 1861, at the age of 23.

Her mother died when Cynthia was two. Her father subsequently remarried, and Cynthia then lived with four siblings (one died in infancy), her step-mother, a half-sister, and two half-brothers. After attending St. Michael's School, Bloemfontein, she moved to live with her sister in Mashonaland.

In 1895 she married Philip Stockley (1870–1917), a member of the Mashonaland Mounted Police, in Salisbury (now Harare). They moved to Umtali (now Mutare) where her daughter Dorothy was born in 1896.

The Stockleys separated later in 1896: she to take up a career in journalism and writing, he to participate in the Boer War. Thinking Philip had been killed in the Boer War, she remarried. Her husband was Joseph Byrne (1870–1945), an Irish doctor in New York; their son Patrick was born there in 1905 pp99.

She also worked as an actress and bought a farm in Rhodesia and a house in Norfolk. In 1916 married Harold Pelham Browne (1880–1939), an officer in the British army serving in Paris pp288.

Stockley died in London in January 1936, having gassed herself in her apartment. Her death was reported in newspapers around the world. The coroner returned a verdict of death by gas poisoning 'whilst of unsound mind'. She is buried in Sheringham, Norfolk.

== Career ==
Stockley wrote her first novel in her adopted country, with Virginia of the Rhodesians (1903). In The Claw (1911), Stockley's heroes are heavily impacted by the powerful African landscape: "Africa has kissed him on the mouth and he will not leave her." In The Claw, she wrote of the country's empty landscapes that allowed for both personal freedom and expansion of the soul: "The world seemed filled with gracious dimness and made up of illimitable space. An indescribable feeling of happy freedom filled my heart. It seemed to me that the lungs of my soul drew breath and expanded as they had never done in any land before." Although Stockley shows a commitment to Rhodesian patriotism in her novels, her nationalism shifted towards Union with South Africa in Tagati (1930).

=== Novels ===
Her 16 books included:

- Virginia of the Rhodesians, London: Hutchinson 1903
- Poppy: the Story of a South African Girl, London: Hurst and Blackett 1909
- The Claw, London: Hurst and Blackett 1911
- The Dream Ship [Wanderfoot in America], London: Hurst and Blackett 1913
- Blue Aloes: Stories of South Africa, London: Hutchinson 1918
- Ponjola, London: Constable 1923
- Tagati, London: Constable 1930

=== Films ===
With the advent of silent film several of her books were made into films:

- Poppy (1917)
- The Claw (1918)
- Wild Honey (1922)
- Ponjola (1923)
- The Female (1924)
- The Claw (1927)

=== Other ===
- Pink Gods (1922), an adaptation of her story "Pink Gods and Blue Demons"
