= Environment (1922 film) =

1922 film

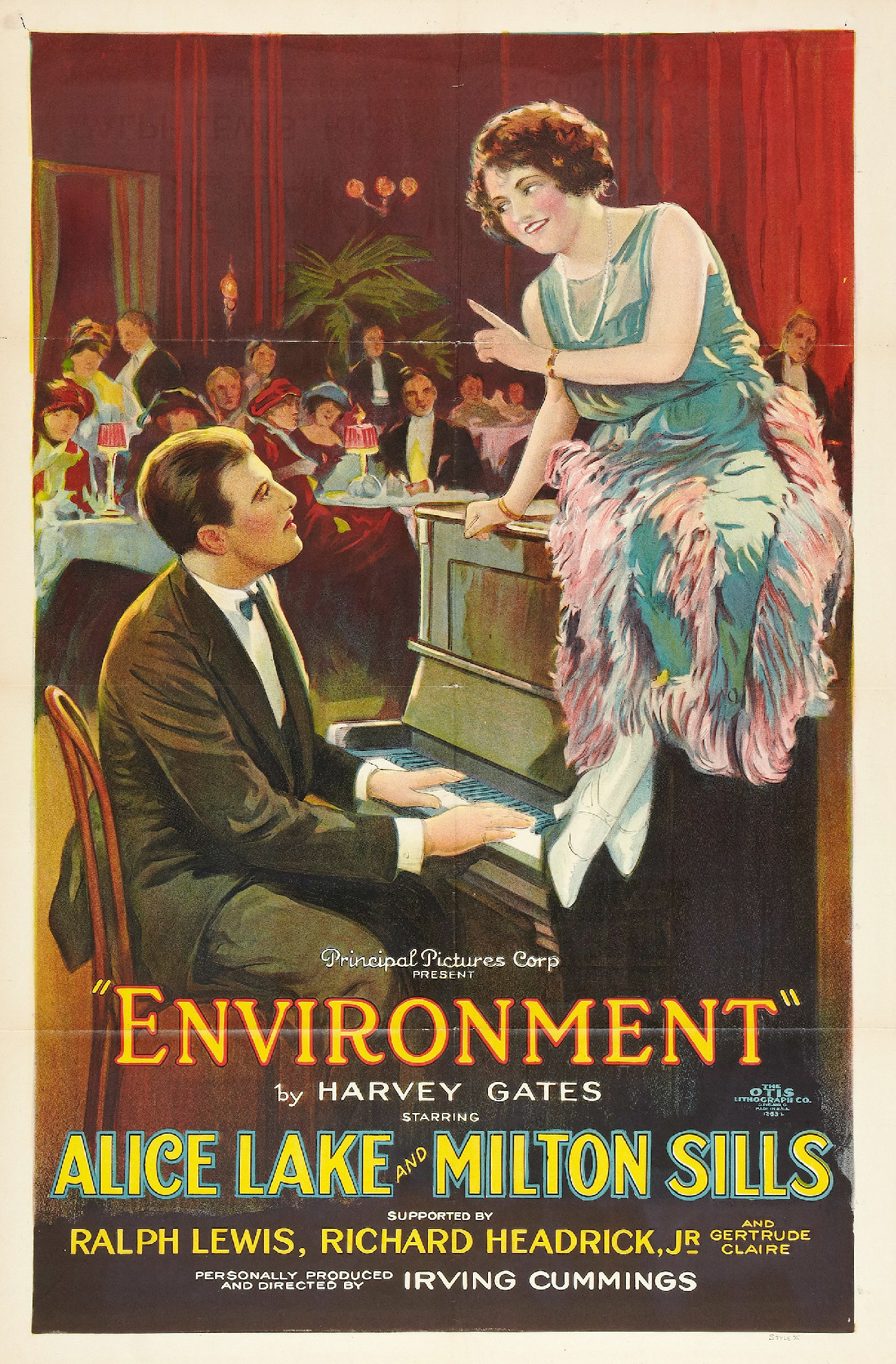
- Directed by: Irving Cummings
- Written by: Harvey Gates
- Produced by: Irving Cummings; Sol Lesser
- Starring: Milton Sills; Alice Lake; Gertrude Claire
- Production company: Irving Cummings Productions
- Distributed by: Principal Distributing
- Release date: December 1, 1922
- Running time: 60 minutes
- Country: United States
- Languages: Silent; English intertitles

Environment is a 1922 American silent crime film directed by Irving Cummings and starring Milton Sills, Alice Lake and Gertrude Claire.

== Plot ==
As part of her rehabilitation, a reformed female crook is sent to work for a man who was robbed by her partners. Over time she falls in love with him but the return of her formal criminal associates drags her back to her old life.

== Cast ==
- Milton Sills as Steve MacLaren
- Alice Lake as Sally 'Chicago Sal' Dolan
- Ben Hewlett as Willie Boy Toval
- Gertrude Claire as Grandma MacLaren
- Richard Headrick as Jimmie
- Ralph Lewis as Diamond Jim Favre

== Bibliography ==
- Connelly, Robert B. The Silents: Silent Feature Films, 1910-36, Volume 40, Issue 2. December Press, 1998.
- Munden, Kenneth White. The American Film Institute Catalog of Motion Pictures Produced in the United States, Part 1. University of California Press, 1997.
