= Poppy (1917 film) =

1917 film

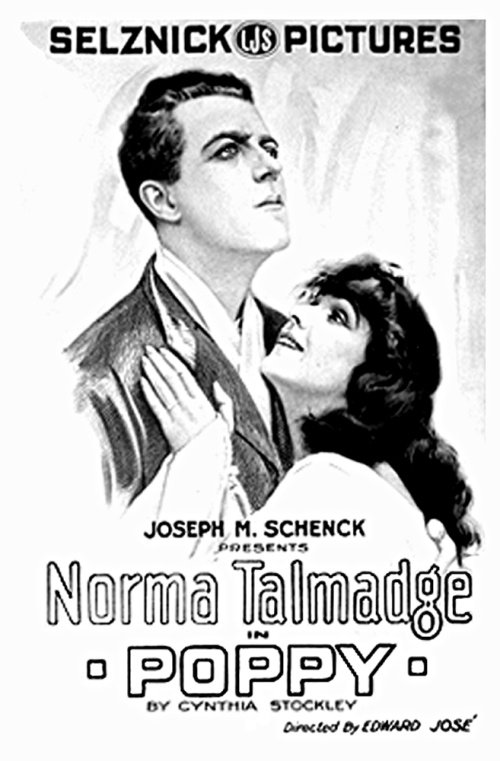
- Advertisement
- Directed by: Edward José
- Written by: Edward José
- Based on: Poppy by Ben Teal and John P. Ritter Poppy by Cynthia Stockley
- Produced by: Joseph M. Schenck
- Cinematography: Benjamin Struckman
- Production company: Norma Talmadge Film Corporation
- Distributed by: Selznick Pictures
- Release date: May 4, 1917
- Running time: 8 reels
- Country: United States
- Language: Silent (English intertitles)

Poppy is a 1917 American silent adventure drama film directed by Edward José and starring Norma Talmadge, Eugene O'Brien, and Frederick Perry.

== Plot ==
As described in a film magazine review, Poppy Destin, ill-treated from birth, runs away and falls into the hands of a wealthy man who adores her. Fearless lest he lose her, he marries her without her knowledge. Complications arise which make her life even more bitter, but finally the man releases her from the marriage, making it possible for Poppy to marry the man she loves.

== Cast ==
- Norma Talmadge as Poppy Destin
- Eugene O'Brien as Sir Evelyn Carson
- Frederick Perry as Luce Abinger
- Jack Meredith as Dr. Bramhan
- Dorothy Rogers as Mrs. Capron
- Edna Whistler as Sophie Cornell
- Marie Haynes as Mrs. Kennedy

== Censorship ==
Before Poppy could be exhibited in Kansas, the Kansas Board of Review required the removal of all scenes and intertitles of Poppy's child, a close up shot of a dead black man, and intertitles describing the reason Poppy left Luce.

== Preservation ==
The film is presumed to be lost, with the Library of Congress having a two-reel condensation of the second half of the film.
