= Feet of Clay (1924 film) =

1924 film

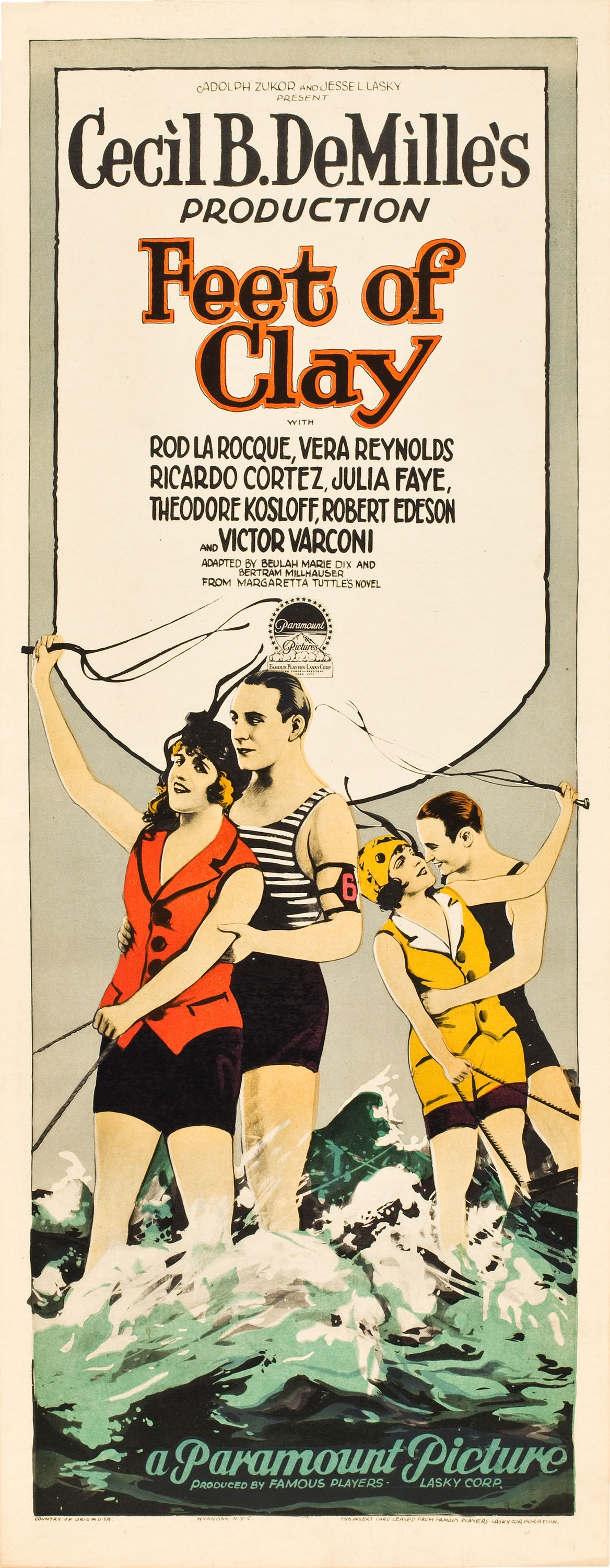
- 1924 theatrical poster
- Directed by: Cecil B. DeMille
- Written by: Beulah Marie Dix (scenario); Bertram Millhauser (scenario)
- Based on: Feet of Clay by Margaretta Tuttle and Across the Border by Beulah Marie Dix
- Produced by: Adolph Zukor; Jesse L. Lasky; Cecil B. DeMille
- Starring: Vera Reynolds; Rod La Rocque
- Cinematography: J. Peverell Marley; Archie Stout
- Edited by: Anne Bauchens
- Production company: Famous Players–Lasky
- Distributed by: Paramount Pictures
- Release date: September 28, 1924
- Country: United States
- Language: Silent (English intertitles)
- Budget: $513,636.27
- Box office: $904,383.90

Feet of Clay is a 1924 American silent drama film directed and produced by Cecil B. DeMille, starring Vera Reynolds and Rod La Rocque, and with set design by Norman Bel Geddes. The film is based on the 1923 novel by Margaretta Tuttle, and Beulah Marie Dix's one-act 1915 play Across the Border.

Location shooting for the film was done off of Catalina Island in California.

== Plot ==
Kerry Harlan is unable to work because he was injured in a battle with a shark, so his youthful wife Amy becomes a fashion model. While she is away from home, Bertha, the wife of his surgeon, tries to force her attention on Kerry and is accidentally killed in an attempt to evade her husband. After the scandal Amy is courted by Tony Channing, but she returns to her husband and finds him near death from gas fumes. Because they both attempted to make suicide, their spirits are rejected by "the other side" and, learning the truth from Bertha's spirit, they fight their way back to life.

== Cast ==
- Vera Reynolds as Amy Loring
- Rod La Rocque as Kerry Harlan
- Julia Faye as Bertha Lansell
- Ricardo Cortez as Tony Channing
- Robert Edeson as Dr. Fergus Lansell
- Theodore Kosloff as Bendick
- Victor Varconi as Bookkeeper
- William Boyd as Young Society Man (uncredited)
- J.C. Fowler (uncredited)
- Lucien Littlefield (uncredited)

== Preservation ==
With no prints of Feet of Clay located in any film archives, it is considered a lost film.

== See also ==
- List of lost films
