= The Female (1924 film) =

1924 film by Sam Wood

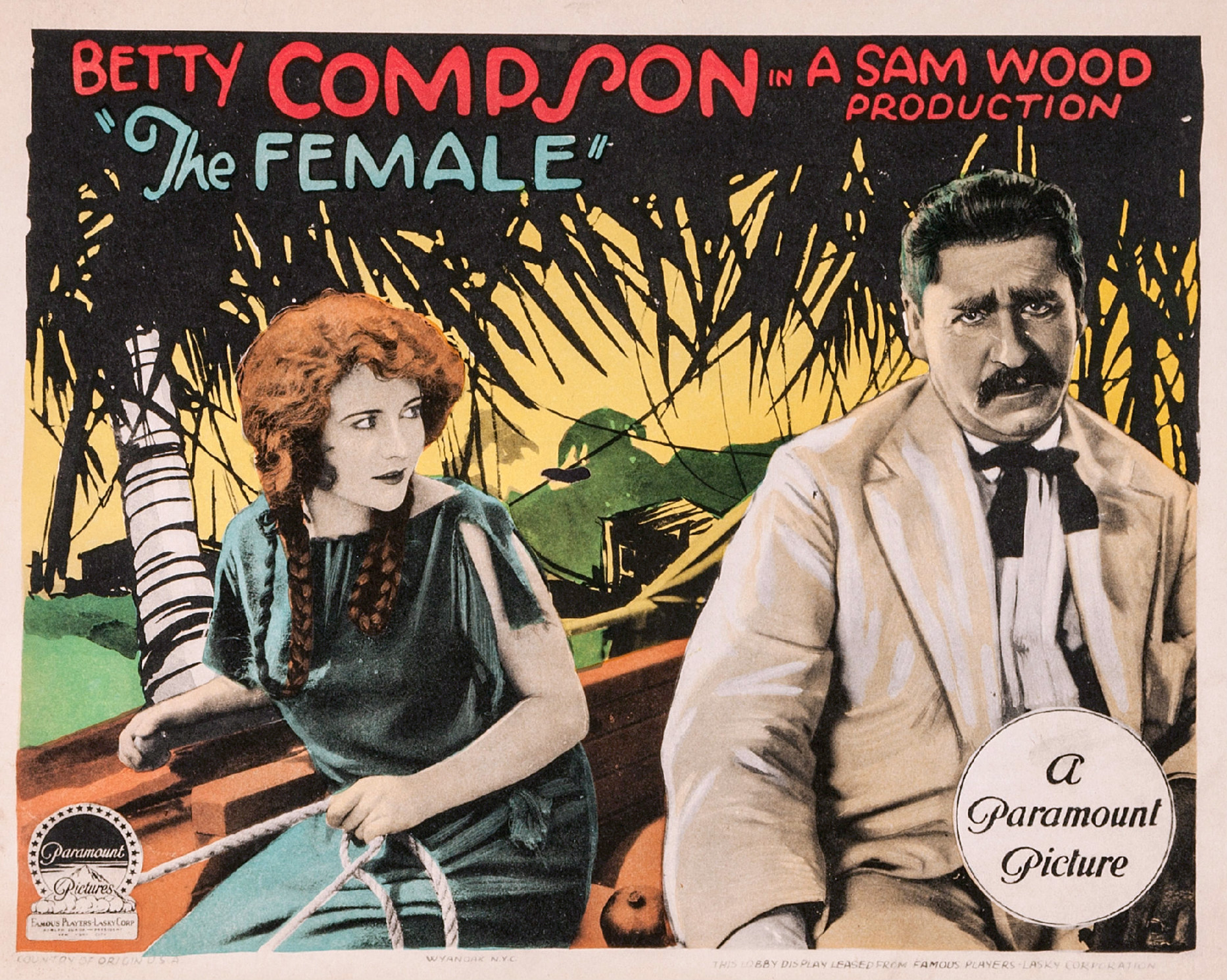
- Lobby card
- Directed by: Sam Wood
- Written by: Agnes Christine Johnston
- Based on: Dalla, the Lion Cub by Cynthia Stockley
- Produced by: Adolph Zukor; Jesse Lasky
- Cinematography: Alfred Gilks
- Distributed by: Paramount Pictures
- Release date: August 31, 1924
- Running time: 70 minutes
- Country: United States
- Language: Silent (English intertitles)

The Female is a 1924 American silent drama film directed by Sam Wood and starring Betty Compson, Warner Baxter, and Noah Beery. It is based on the novel Dalla, the Lion Cub by Cynthia Stockley.

== Cast ==
- Betty Compson as Dalla
- Warner Baxter as Colonel Valentia
- Noah Beery as Barend de Beer
- Dorothy Cumming as Clodah Harrison
- Freeman Wood as Clon Biron
- Helen Butler as Laura Alcutt
- Pauline French as Mrs. Cstigne
- Edgar Norton as Clyde Wiel
- Florence Wix as Lady Malete

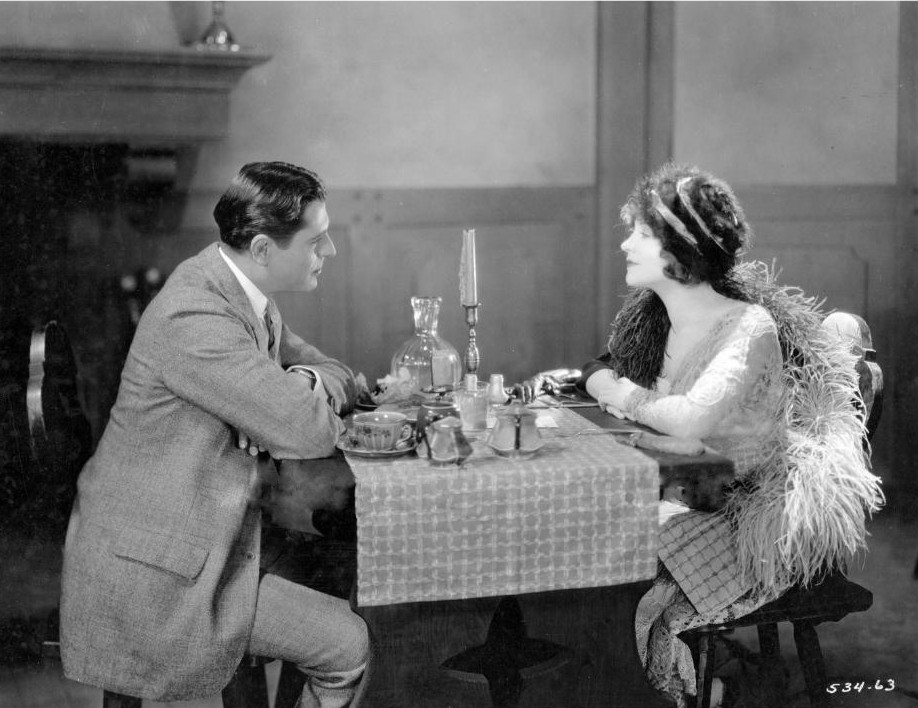
Scene from the film.

== Preservation ==
The Female is currently presumed lost. In February of 2021, the film was cited by the National Film Preservation Board on their Lost U.S. Silent Feature Films list.
