= The Heart Bandit =

1924 film directed by Oscar Apfel

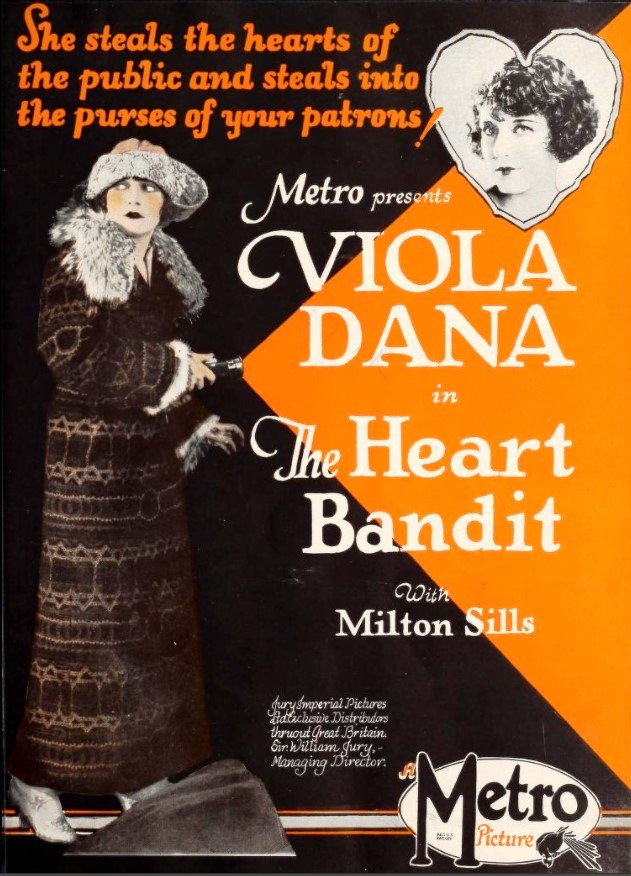
- Advertisement
- Directed by: Oscar Apfel
- Written by: Tom J. Hopkins; Fred Myton
- Starring: Viola Dana; Milton Sills; Gertrude Claire
- Cinematography: John Arnold
- Production company: Metro Pictures
- Distributed by: Metro Pictures
- Release date: January 24, 1924 (United States)
- Running time: 50 minutes
- Country: United States
- Language: Silent (English intertitles)

The Heart Bandit is a 1924 American silent drama film directed by Oscar Apfel and starring Viola Dana, Milton Sills, and Gertrude Claire.

== Plot ==
As described in a film magazine review, Molly O'Hara's criminal gang sets out to hold up a fast truck coming across the Canadian border that they believe is carrying a rich cargo of bootleg liquor. When the gang comes alongside the truck and point a gun, it turns out they have been double-crossed as the canvas flaps of the truck go up to reveal half a dozen detectives and policemen holding revolvers. Molly is able to escape being caught and takes refuge on the private estate of John Rand, the leader of a powerful group of Wall Street manipulators. John's mother takes a liking to her and so adopts her. John is entering a shady financial deal with a business foe who is being aided by a South American, Ramón Orestest Córdova. The latter falls in love with Molly, but she finds out that he plans to double-cross John by having federal officials raid his estate. Molly, with the assistance of her old crony Spike Malone, that night cracks open the safe in the Rand mansion to rescue incriminating papers that, if obtained by the federal officials, would land John in the penitentiary. In this way, assisted by Mrs. Rand, she is able to set herself on the straight life.

== Cast ==
- Viola Dana as Molly O'Hara
- Milton Sills as John Rand
- Gertrude Claire as Mrs. Rand
- Wallace MacDonald as 'Spike' Malone
- Bertram Grassby as Ramón Orestest Córdova
- DeWitt Jennings as Pat O'Connell
- Nelson McDowell as Jenks
- Matthew Betz as Monk Hinman
- Edward Wade as Silas Wetherbee

== Censorship ==
Before The Heart Bandit could be exhibited in Kansas, the Kansas Board of Review required the removal of an intertitle in reel 1 that said; "Bootlegger - say I'm selling oil stocks," all scenes where women were smoking, and the shortening of a gambling scene in reel 2.

== Preservation ==
With no prints of The Heart Bandit located in any film archives, it is a lost film.

== Bibliography ==
- Munden, Kenneth White. The American Film Institute Catalog of Motion Pictures Produced in the United States, Part 1. University of California Press, 1997.
