= Paul Perry (cinematographer) =

American cinematographer

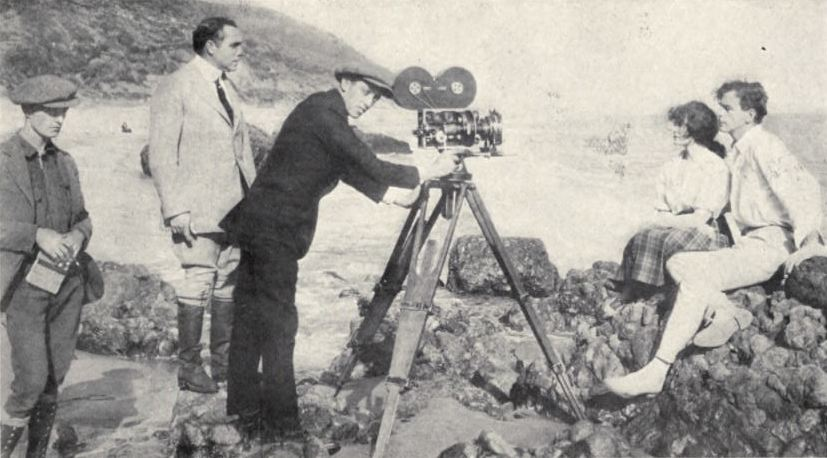
- Perry on the set of At the End of the World
- Born: Paul Percy Perry; December 13, 1891; Denver, Colorado, USA
- Died: October 24, 1963 (aged 71); Los Angeles, California, USA
- Occupation: Cinematographer
- Relatives: Harry Perry (brother)

Paul Percy Perry (1891 – 1963) was an American cinematographer who worked in Hollywood from the silent era through the 1940s. He was the brother of fellow cameraman Harry Perry.

== Biography ==
Paul was born in Colorado to Frank Perry and Fanny Teeter. He worked at Pickford-Fairbanks Studios on films like 1923's Rosita and was also noted for being one of Mack Sennett's cameraman. He was a founding member of the American Society of Cinematographers, and served on its board of governors early on.

== Partial filmography ==
- Sweet Kitty Bellairs (1916)
- The Thousand-Dollar Husband (1916)
- The Lash (1916)
- Unprotected (1916)
- Lost and Won (1917)
- What Money Can't Buy (1917)
- The Ghost House (1917)
- Nan of Music Mountain (1917)
- The Hidden Pearls (1918)
- Wild Youth (1918)
- The Bravest Way (1918)
- Sandy (1918)
- The City of Dim Faces (1918)
- The Cruise of the Make-Believes (1918)
- Such a Little Pirate (1918)
- Good Gracious, Annabelle (1919)
- Everywoman (1919)
- At the End of the World (1921)
- The Little Minister (1921)
- Over the Border (1922)
- Pink Gods (1922)
- Singed Wings (1922)
- Ponjola (1923)
- Introduce Me (1925)
- Souls for Sables (1925)
- Caught in the Kitchen (1928)
- Hubby's Latest Alibi (1928)
- His New Stenographer (1928)
- Pink Pajamas (1929)
- Two Plus Fours (1930)
- The Bluffer (1930)
- Take Your Medicine (1930)
- Strange Birds (1930)
- A Hollywood Theme Song (1930)
- A Poor Fish (1931)
- The Bride's Mistake (1931)
- Just a Bear (1931)
- Movie-Town (1931)
- Dos amigos y un amor (1938)
- Concierto de almas (1942)
