= Ponjola =

1923 film

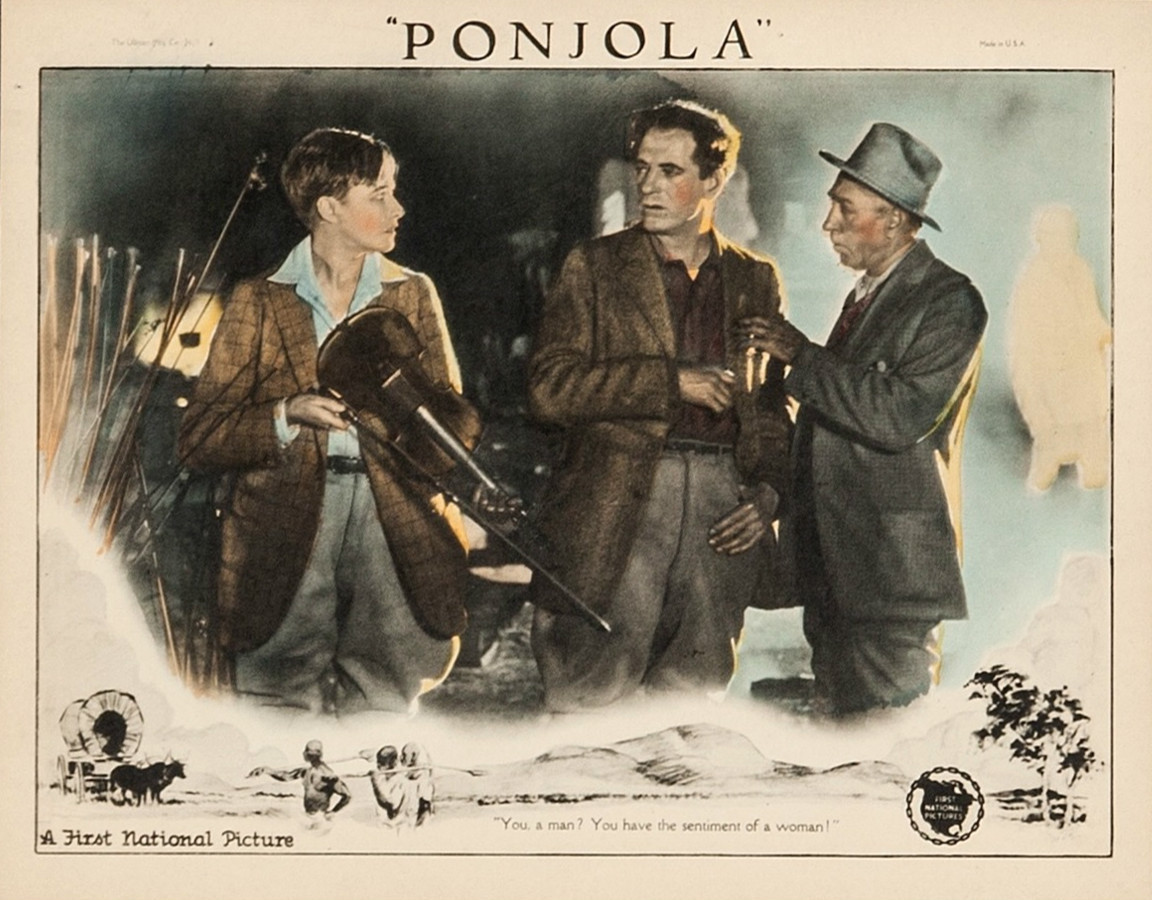
- Lobby card
- Directed by: Donald Crisp
- Screenplay by: Charles Logue
- Based on: Ponjola by Cynthia Stockley
- Produced by: Sam E. Rork
- Starring: Anna Q. Nilsson; James Kirkwood; Tully Marshall
- Cinematography: Paul Perry
- Distributed by: Associated First National Pictures
- Release date: October 29, 1923
- Running time: 70 minutes
- Country: United States
- Language: Silent (English intertitles)

Ponjola is a 1923 American silent drama film based on the 1923 novel of the same name by Cynthia Stockley and directed by Donald Crisp. The film stars Anna Q. Nilsson in a role in which she masquerades as a man.

== Cast ==
- Anna Q. Nilsson as Lady Flavia Desmond
- James Kirkwood as Lune Druro
- Tully Marshall as Count Blauhimel
- Joseph Kilgour as Conrad Lypiatt
- Bernard Randall as Eric Luff
- Ruth Clifford as Gay Lypiatt
- Claire Du Brey as Luchia Luff
- Claire McDowell as Mrs. Hope
- Charles Ray as Native Tribesman
- Eddie Sturgis as Native Tribesman (credited as Edwin Sturges)
- Olive Borden as Native Girl (uncredited)

== Preservation ==
A print of Ponjola is held by a private collector.
