= Wild Honey (1922 film) =

1922 film by Wesley Ruggles

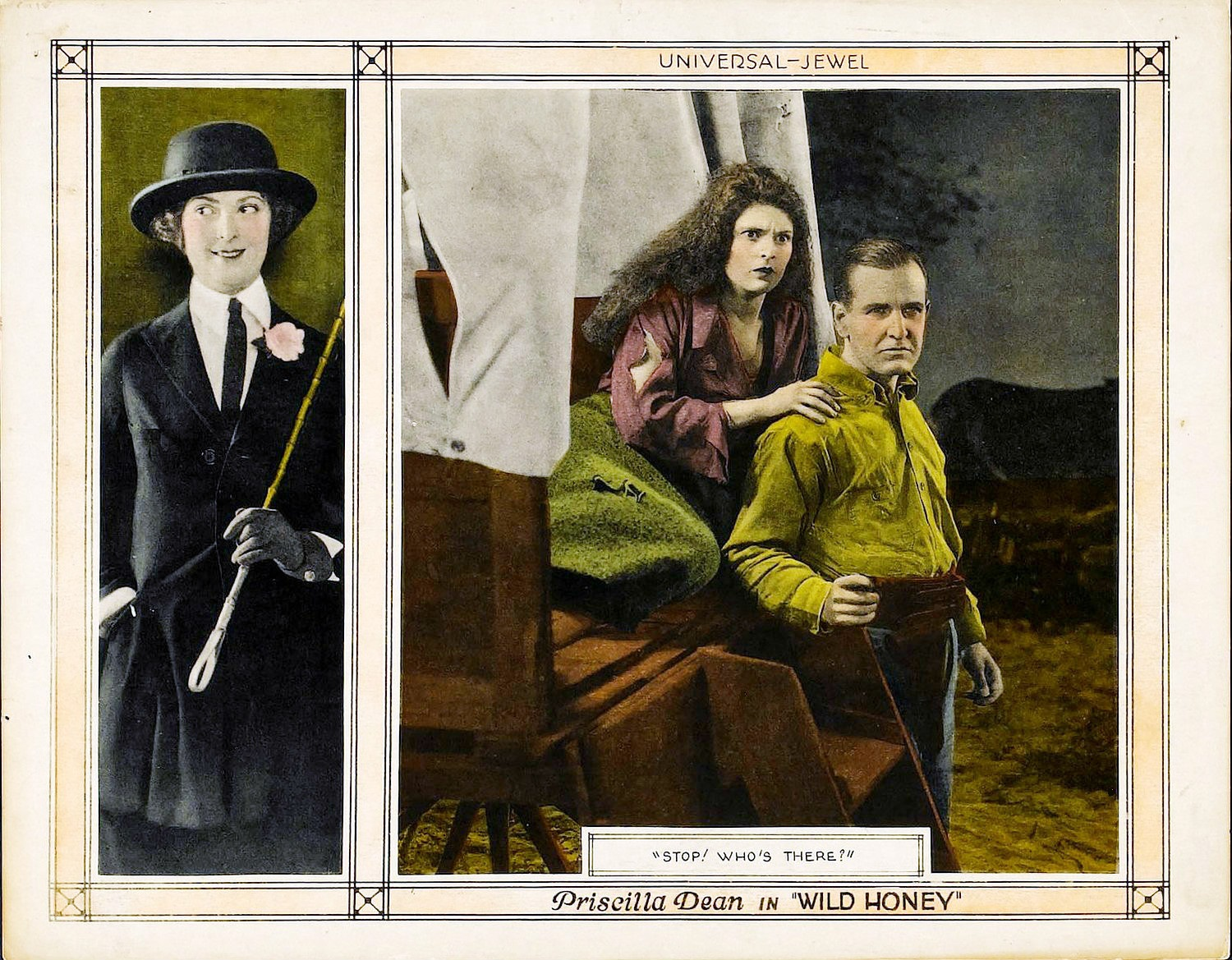
- Lobby card
- Directed by: Wesley Ruggles
- Written by: Lucien Hubbard (scenario)
- Based on: Wild Honey: Stories of South Africa by Cynthia Stockley
- Produced by: Carl Laemmle
- Starring: Priscilla Dean; Noah Beery, Sr.; Wallace Beery
- Cinematography: Harry Thorpe
- Distributed by: Universal Film Manufacturing Company
- Release date: February 27, 1922 (New York)
- Running time: 71 minute
- Country: United States
- Language: Silent (English intertitles)

Wild Honey is a 1922 American silent romantic adventure film directed by Wesley Ruggles. Produced and distributed by the Universal Film Manufacturing Company, the film is based on a book of the same title by Cynthia Stockley and stars Priscilla Dean, and features Noah Beery, Sr. and Wallace Beery in supporting roles. It is notable for the first use of a traveling matte special effect.

It is not known whether the film currently survives.

== Plot ==
Despite her father's debt to him, Lady Vivienne refuses to marry the wealthy but villainous Henry Porthen. Porthen devises a plot to lure Vivienne to his country home using her weak-willed friend, Freddy. In the course of events, Vivienne faints, Porthen is killed by his secretary Joan, and Freddy runs away for fear that he will be blamed.

Three years later, Vivienne travels to Transvaal to investigate some problem property she owns. She is rescued from bandits by homesteader Kerry Burgess and the two fall in love. More intrigue brought about by Vivienne's rejection of another suitor, Wolf Montague, leads to the sabotage of a dam and a destructive flood. Vivienne tries to warn the settlers in the flood's path and is herself swept up in it. Burgess rescues her again and they are united.

== Cast ==
- Priscilla Dean – Lady Vivienne
- Noah Beery, Sr. – Henry Porthen
- Lloyd Whitlock – Freddy Sutherland
- Raymond Blathwayt – Sir Hugh
- Percy Challenger – Ebenezer Learnish
- Helen Raymond – Joan Rudd
- Landers Stevens – Wolf Montague
- Robert Ellis – Kerry Burgess
- Wallace Beery – Buck Roper
- Carl Stockdale – Liverpool Blondie
- Christian J. Frank – Repington
- Harry DeRoy – Koos

== Production ==
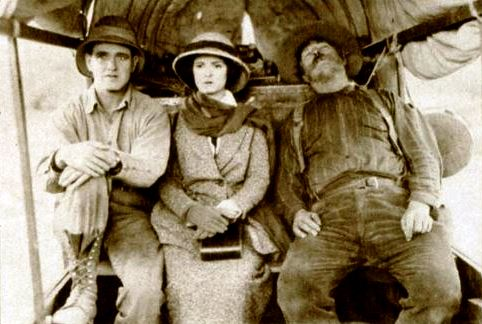
Robert Ellis, Priscilla Dean, and Wallace Beery

Cynthia Stockley's novel Wild Honey was purchased by Universal in 1921 with Priscilla Dean already in mind. Brothers Wallace and Noah Beery appeared for the first time in the same feature film.

This was the first film in which a traveling matte process (called the "Williams process" after its inventor) was used. The action of the players was filmed against a black screen, and a scene in miniature of a bursting dam and consequent flood was filmed separately, then the two were combined by the process.

== Release ==
Wild Honey opened in New York at the Central Theatre on February 27, 1922.

Reviews were mostly negative, but many critics singled out the flood scene as impressive and some regarded it as worth the price of admission. The Variety review expressed the opinion that the movie was cheaply made and that, except for the flood scene, the production suffered as a result. Reviewing the film for Life, Robert E. Sherwood called it "a pitifully weak piece of work". The capsule review in Photoplay labeled it "as dull an evening's entertainment as you can find anywhere".
