= Men of Steel (1926 film) =

1926 film by George Archainbaud

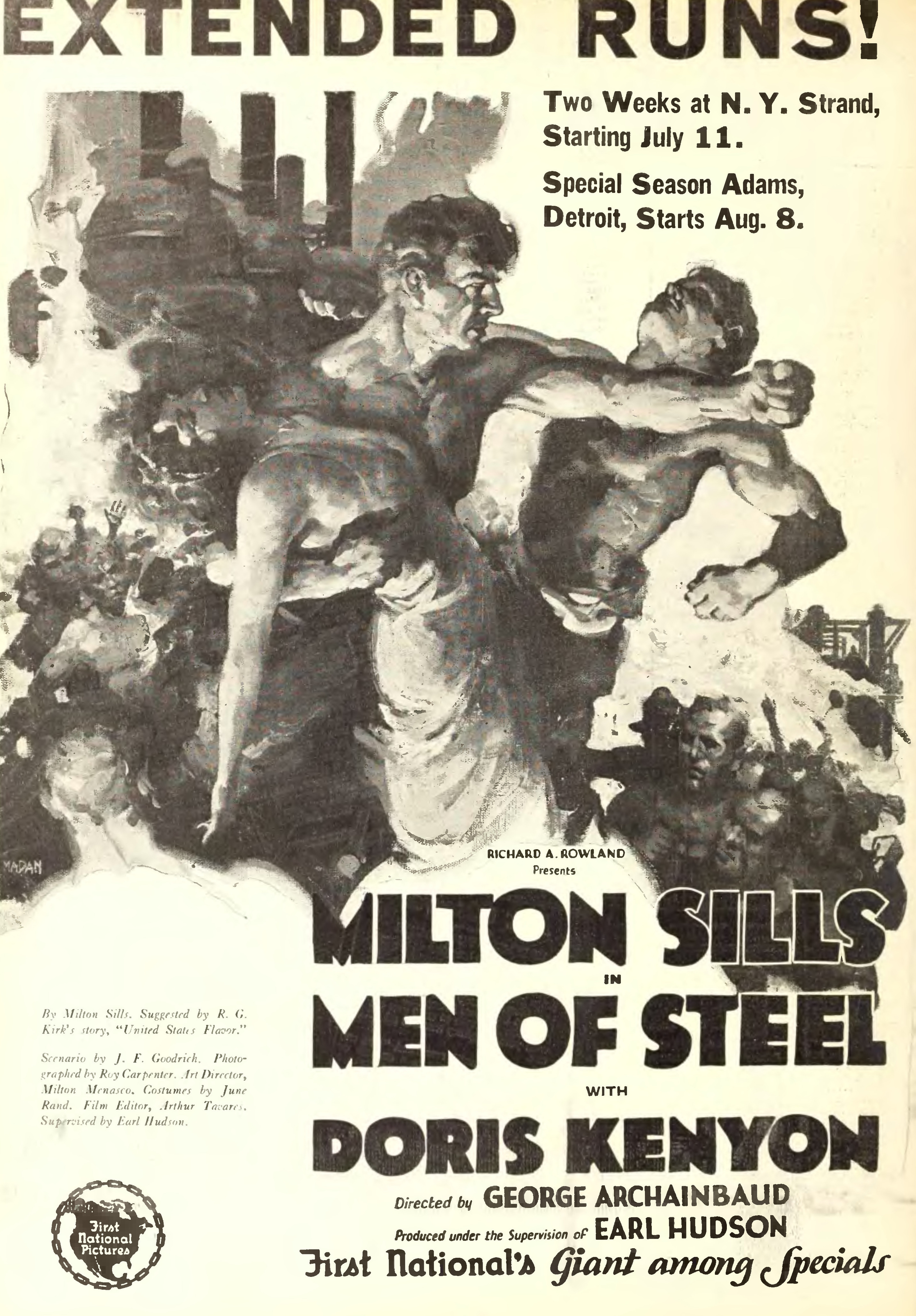
- Directed by: George Archainbaud
- Written by: R.G. Kirk; Milton Sills
- Starring: Milton Sills; Doris Kenyon; May Allison
- Cinematography: Roy Carpenter
- Edited by: Arthur Tavares
- Production company: First National Pictures
- Distributed by: First National Pictures
- Release date: July 11, 1926
- Running time: 100 minutes
- Country: United States
- Language: Silent (English intertitles)

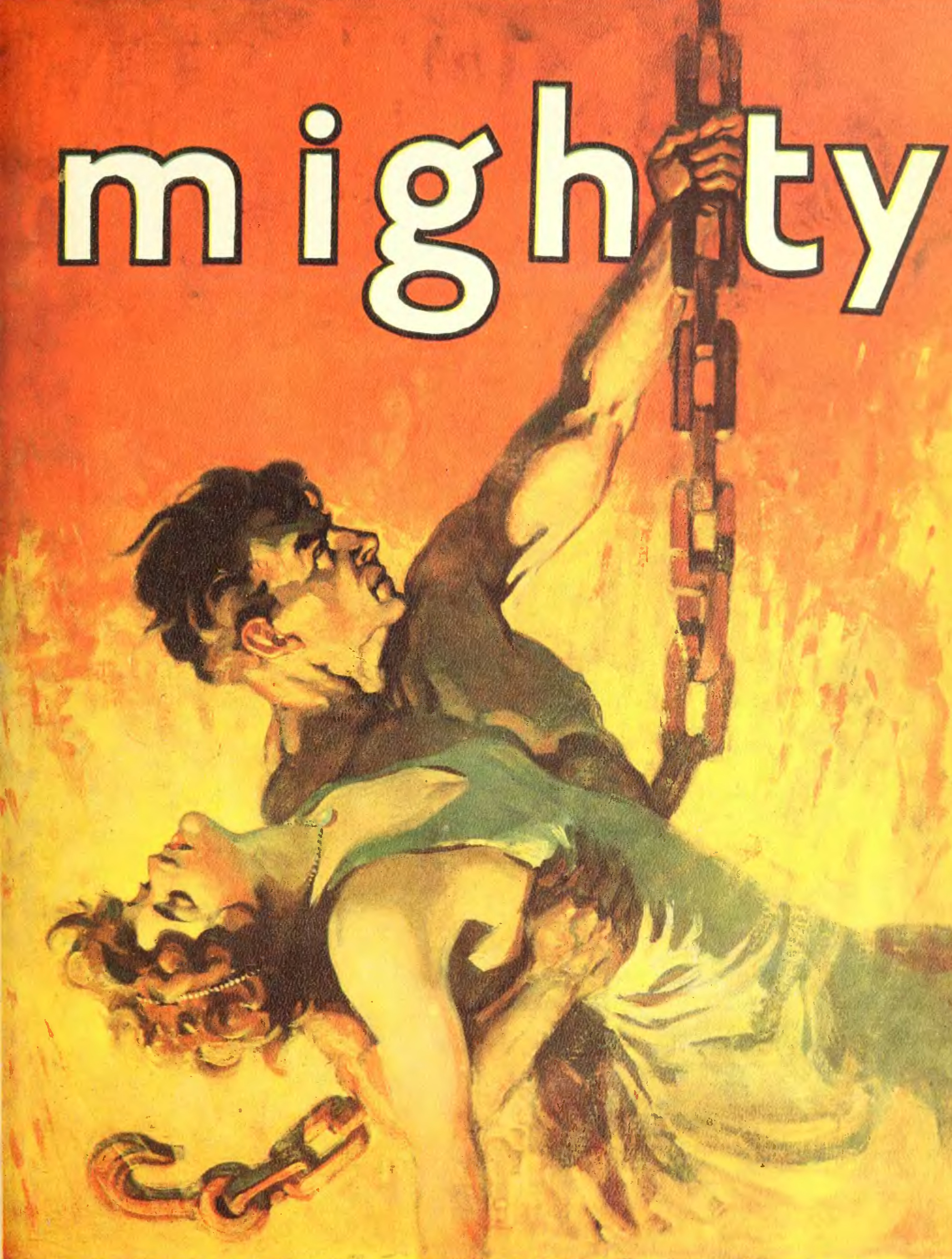
Men of Steel ad in Motion Picture News, 1926

Men of Steel is a 1926 American silent drama film directed by George Archainbaud and starring Milton Sills, Doris Kenyon, and May Allison.

The film's sets were designed by the art director Milton Menasco.

== Cast ==
- Milton Sills as Jan Bokak
- Doris Kenyon as Mary Berwick
- May Allison as Clare Pitt
- Victor McLaglen as Pete Masarick
- Frank Currier as Cinder Pitt
- George Fawcett as Hooker Grimes
- John Kolb as Anton Berwick
- Harry Lee as Frazer
- Henry West as Wolfe
- Taylor Graves as Alex

== Production ==
Men of Steel was shot partially on location at Birmingham, Alabama.

== Bibliography ==
- Michael Slade Shull. Radicalism in American Silent Films, 1909-1929: A Filmography and History. McFarland, 2000. ISBN 9780786406920
