= At the End of the World =

1921 American silent action drama film

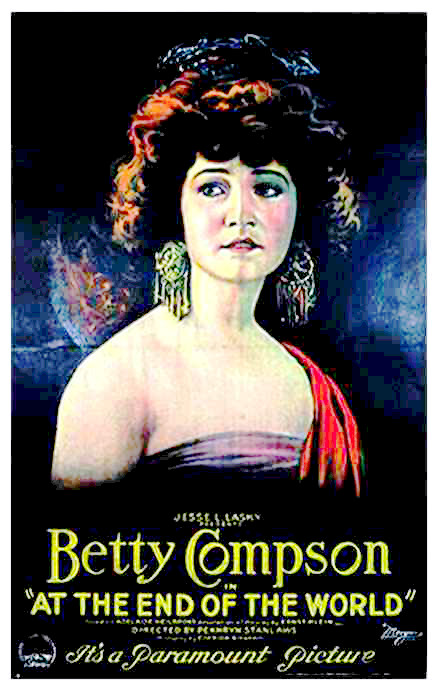
- Film poster
- Directed by: Penrhyn Stanlaws
- Written by: Edfrid A. Bingham (scenario); Adelaide Heilbron (adaptation)
- Based on: At the End of the World by Ernst Klein
- Produced by: Famous Players–Lasky
- Starring: Betty Compson; Milton Sills
- Cinematography: Paul Perry
- Distributed by: Paramount Pictures
- Release date: August 14, 1921
- Running time: 6 reels; 5,729 feet
- Country: United States
- Language: Silent (English intertitles)

At the End of the World is a 1921 American silent action drama film directed by Penrhyn Stanlaws. It was produced by Famous Players–Lasky and distributed by Paramount Pictures. It is based on the play At the End of the World by Ernst Klein and starred Betty Compson and Milton Sills. The film is the directorial debut of Stanlaws and Compson's first starring role for Paramount.

== Cast ==
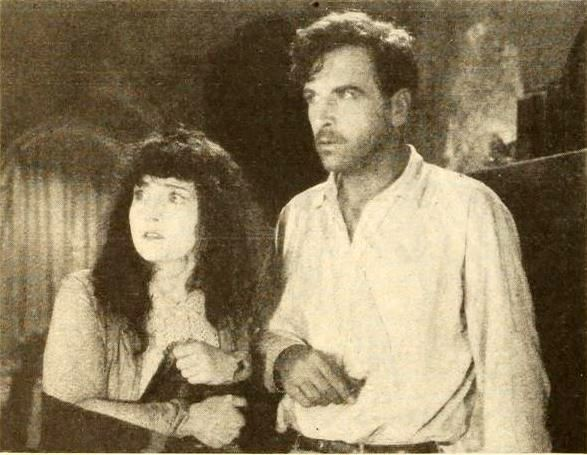
Film still with Compson and Sills

- Betty Compson as Cherry O'Day
- Milton Sills as Gordon Deane
- Mitchell Lewis as Donald MacGregor
- Casson Ferguson as Harvey Gates
- Spottiswoode Aitken as Terence O'Day
- Joseph Kilgour as William Blaine
- Goro Kino as Uang

== Preservation ==
A complete print of At the End of the World is held at the Gosfilmofond Russian State Archive.
