= Margaretta Tuttle =

American writer

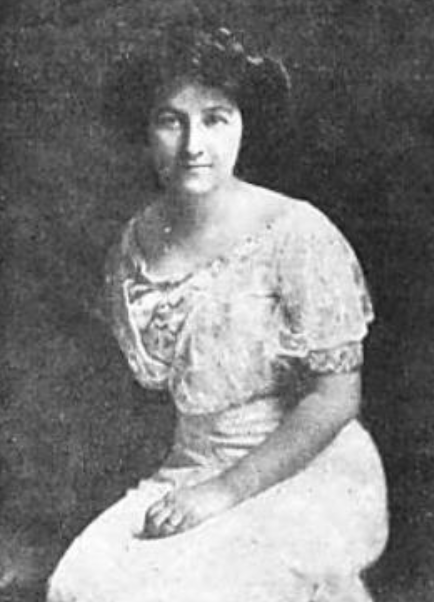
- Margaretta Tuttle, from a 1926 publication
- Born: September 2, 1875; Cleveland, Ohio, U.S.
- Died: 1958
- Occupation: Writer

Margaretta Muhlenberg Tuttle (née Perkins; September 2, 1875 – 1958) was an American writer of the early 20th century.

== Early life and education ==
Margaretta Tuttle was born in Cleveland, the daughter of lawyer and newspaper editor George Perkins (1847–1895) and Gertrude Withers Perkins (1853–1889) of Cincinnati. Margaretta's father committed suicide by poison, leaving a note complaining of ill health. She was educated at the University of Cincinnati.

== Career ==
Stories and articles by her started to appear in 1910, starting with the article "Maternity and the Woman Intellectual” (Collier's, January 29, 1910) and the story "The Greatest of These" (Ainslee's Magazine, Sept. 1910).

Tuttle wrote fiction and articles for markets such as Collier's, Ainslee's Magazine, Metropolitan Magazine, Harper's Weekly, the Women's Home Companion, the Ladies' Home Journal, Good Housekeeping, and the Saturday Evening Post from 1910 to 1932. Tuttle supported women's suffrage and wrote a number of articles encouraging women to attend college and enter the workforce. She also wrote about health and diet. Her best-known work of fiction was probably the novel Feet of Clay, which was filmed by Cecil B. DeMille as Feet of Clay (1924) and published in several editions, including one with images from the "photoplay". Another story was filmed in 1925 as The Unguarded Hour by Lambert Hillyer.

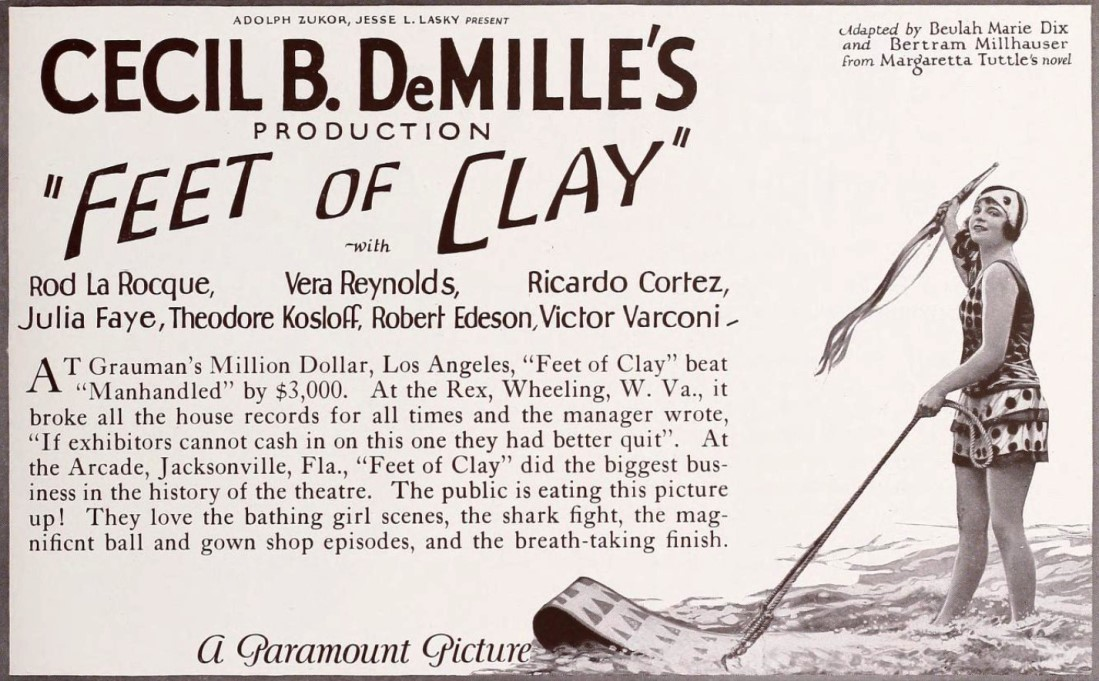
trade advertisement for movie version of "Feet of Clay" (1924)

Tuttle was sued in 1924 by agent Laura Wilck who claimed that Tuttle had cheated her out of her commission on the sale of Feet of Clay to Famous Players/Lasky for $25,000; Tuttle won the case and got court costs from Wilck.

In the late 1920s Tuttle attempted to get screenwriting work in Hollywood, and her daughter Margaretta "Gretta" Tuttle also attempted to break into the business. Gretta had a bit part in the 1929 movie The Sophomore.

== Works ==
Her longer works included:

- "By the Gate of Allah" (1911, Ainslee's Magazine)
- "In His Own House" (1912, Ainslee's Magazine)
- "His Worldly Goods" (1912)
- "In Velvet Gown" (1913, Ainslee's Magazine)
- "The Runaway Rest Cure" (serialized 1915, Women's Home Companion)
- "In All Fairness" (1919, Ainslee's Magazine)
- "The Confessions of a Useless Wife" (serialized 1922, Ladies' Home Journal)
- Feet of Clay (1923)
- "The Cobweb" (serialized 1925, Ladies' Home Journal)
- "Kingdoms of the World" (1926)
- "Little Girl" (serialized 1928, Saturday Evening Post)

== Personal life ==
Margaretta Perkins married businessman Frederic Crosby Tuttle (1865–1953) and had two daughters, Margaretta (1898–1994) and Katherine (1900–1987). She died in 1958.
