= Claw (comics) =

Claw, in comics, may refer to:

- Claw (Lev Gleason Publications)
- Claw the Unconquered, a DC Comics character
- Claw (John Chan), a DC Comics character
- Claw (Gargoyles), a character from the Gargoyles animated series and spin-off comic
- Claw, also known as Ironclaw, from The Legendaries whose name in the original French is Gryf (Gryfenfer)

It may also refer to:

- Cat Claw, a Malibu Comics character
- Claws (comics), a Marvel Comics mini-series
- Crimson Claw, a First Comics character
- Dark Claw, an Amalgam Comics character
- Dragon's Claws, a Marvel UK team and series
- Ripclaw, a Top Cow character
- Sabreclaw, a Marvel Comics MC2 character
- Silverclaw, a Marvel Comics character
- Steel Claw, a British comic character
- Steelclaw, a DC Comics character
- Yellow Claw (character), a Marvel Comics character

== See also ==
- Claw (disambiguation)
