= The Unguarded Hour (1925 film) =

1925 film

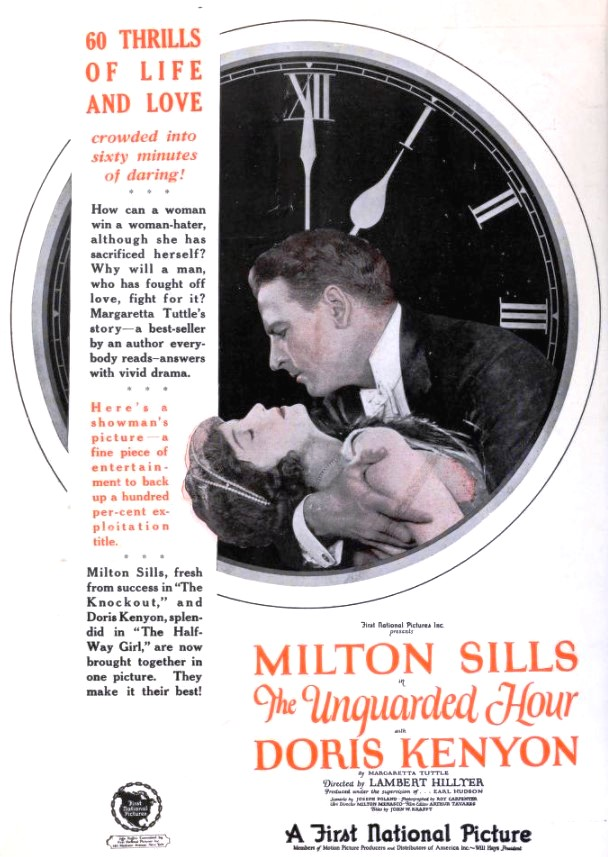
- Advertisement
- Directed by: Lambert Hillyer
- Written by: John W. Krafft; Joseph F. Poland; Margaretta Tuttle
- Starring: Milton Sills; Doris Kenyon; Claude King
- Cinematography: Roy Carpenter
- Edited by: Arthur Tavares
- Production company: First National Pictures
- Distributed by: First National Pictures
- Release date: November 22, 1925
- Running time: 70 minutes
- Country: United States
- Language: Silent (English intertitles)

The Unguarded Hour is a 1925 American silent comedy-drama film directed by Lambert Hillyer and starring Milton Sills, Doris Kenyon, and Claude King. The film's sets were designed by the art director Milton Menasco.

== Plot ==
As described in a review in a film magazine, Bryce Gilbert, business man, shows his daughter Virginia the folly of an intended elopement with a youth. She goes to Italy and meets Duke Andrea d'Arona, a young and handsome man, who is puzzled by her jazzy American ways and doubts her character. Virginia is found with a certain male flirt in her room and misunderstood until it develops that the duke's sister has been misled by the male flirt and is listening in another room. The sister kills herself and the tragedy brings the duke and the young American woman to an understanding of their love.

== Cast ==
- Milton Sills as Andrea
- Doris Kenyon as Virginia Gilbert
- Claude King as Bryce Gilbert
- Dolores Cassinelli as Duchess Bianca
- Cornelius Keefe as Russell Van Alstyne
- Jed Prouty as Gus O'Rorick, a Yeggman
- Tammany Young as Another Yeggman
- Charles Byer as Stelio
- Lorna Duveen as Elena
- Vivia Ogden as Annie, the Maid
- J. Moy Bennett as Butler
- Laura Wood as Virginia Gilbert's swimming double

== Preservation ==
With no prints of The Unguarded Hour located in any film archives, it is a lost film.

== Bibliography ==
- Munden, Kenneth White. The American Film Institute Catalog of Motion Pictures Produced in the United States, Part 1. University of California Press, 1997.
