= Klaw (surname) =

Klaw is a surname. Notable people with the surname include:

- Irving Klaw (1910–1966), American businessman, photographer, and filmmaker
- Marcus Klaw (1858–1936), American lawyer, theatrical producer, and theatre owner
- Rick Klaw (born 1967), American editor, essayist, and bookseller, grandson of Irving Klaw
