= Pink Gods =

1922 film by Penrhyn Stanlaws

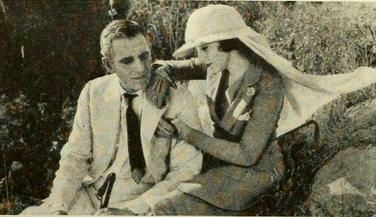
- Still of scene with James Kirkwood and Bebe Daniels
- Directed by: Penrhyn Stanlaws
- Written by: Cynthia Stockley (short story); J. E. Nash (adaptation); Sonya Levien (adaptation); Ewart Adamson (scenario)
- Produced by: Adolph Zukor; Jesse Lasky
- Starring: Bebe Daniels; Adolphe Menjou
- Cinematography: Paul Perry
- Distributed by: Paramount Pictures
- Release date: September 24, 1922
- Running time: 80 minutes; 8 reels (7,180 feet)
- Country: United States
- Language: Silent (English intertitles)

Pink Gods is a 1922 American silent melodrama film produced by Famous Players–Lasky and distributed by Paramount Pictures. It was directed by Penrhyn Stanlaws and starred Bebe Daniels and Adolphe Menjou. The source for the film scenario was the short story Pink Gods and Blue Demons by Cynthia Stockley.

The film was released the same day as Manslaughter in which Pink Gods cast members Raymond Hatton and Guy Oliver also appear.

== Cast ==
- Bebe Daniels as Lorraine Temple
- James Kirkwood as John Quelch
- Anna Q. Nilsson as Lady Margot Cork
- Raymond Hatton as Jim Wingate
- Adolphe Menjou as Louis Barney
- Guy Oliver as Mark Escher
- George Cowl as Colonel Pat Temple
- Arthur Trimble as Dick Cork

== Preservation ==
Pink Gods is currently considered a lost film. In February 2021, the film was cited by the National Film Preservation Board on their Lost U.S. Silent Feature Films list.
