= The Claw (1918 film) =

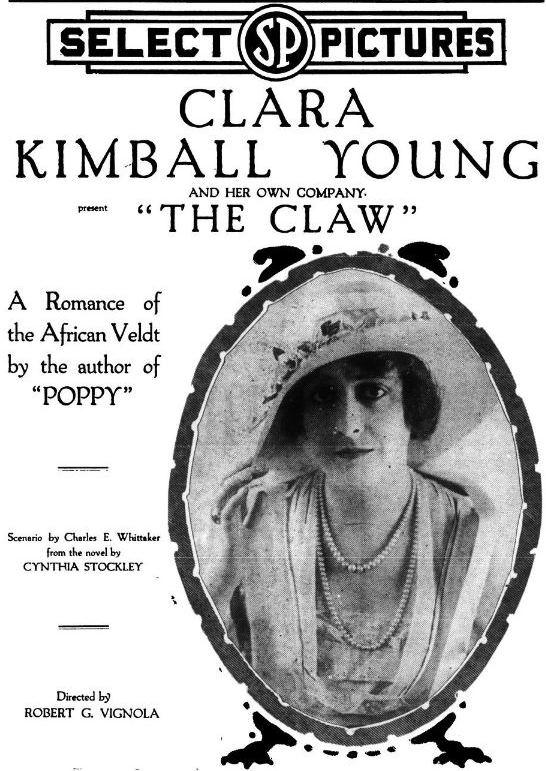
- Advertisement
- Directed by: Robert G. Vignola
- Written by: Charles E. Whittaker
- Based on: The Claw by Cynthia Stockley
- Produced by: Clara Kimball Young
- Starring: Clara Kimball Young; Milton Sills; Jack Holt
- Cinematography: Lewis W. Physioc
- Production company: Clara Kimball Young Film Corporation
- Distributed by: Select Pictures
- Release date: June 10, 1918
- Running time: 50 minutes
- Country: United States
- Language: Silent (English intertitles)

The Claw is a 1918 American silent drama film directed by Robert G. Vignola and starring Clara Kimball Young, Milton Sills, and Jack Holt.

== Cast ==
- Clara Kimball Young as Mary Saurin
- Milton Sills as Major Anthony Kinsella
- Henry Woodward as Richard Saurin
- Mary Mersch as Judy Saurin
- Jack Holt as Maurice Stair
- Edward Kimball as Postmaster
- Marcia Manon as Mrs. Valetta

== Bibliography ==
- Donald W. McCaffrey & Christopher P. Jacobs. Guide to the Silent Years of American Cinema. Greenwood Publishing, 1999. ISBN 0-313-30345-2
