= The Claw (1927 film) =

1927 film

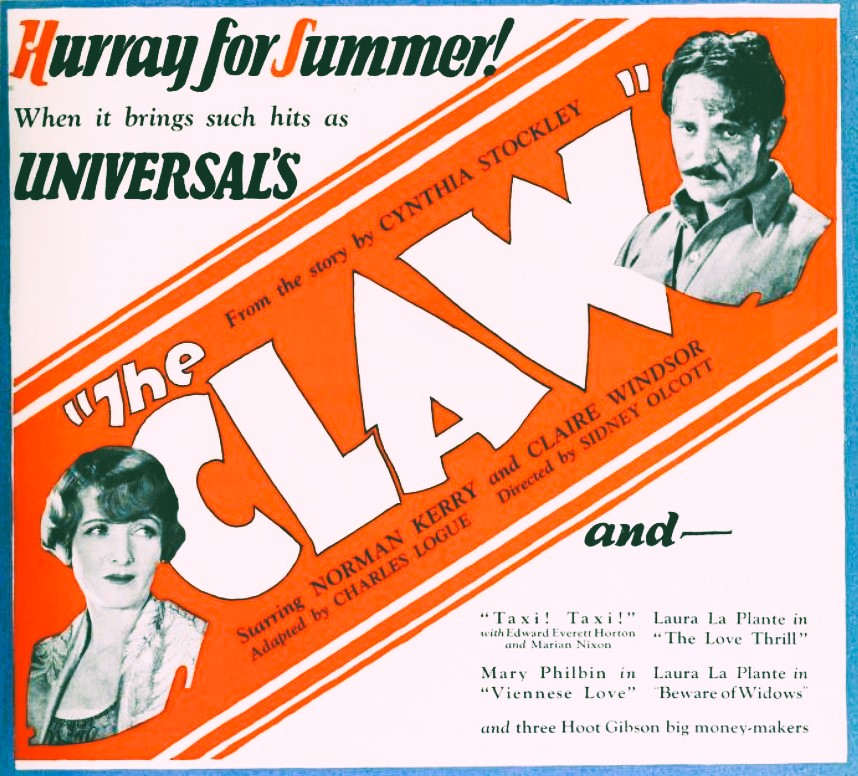
- Advertisement
- Directed by: Sidney Olcott
- Written by: Charles A. Logue
- Based on: The Claw by Cynthia Stockley
- Produced by: Carl Laemmle
- Starring: Norman Kerry; Claire Windsor
- Cinematography: John Stumar
- Edited by: Tom Miranda
- Distributed by: Universal Pictures
- Release date: April 20, 1927
- Running time: 54 minutes (6 reels)
- Country: United States
- Language: Silent (English intertitles)

The Claw is a 1927 American silent drama film produced by Carl Laemmle and distributed by Universal Pictures. It was directed by Sidney Olcott with Norman Kerry and Claire Windsor in the leading roles.

== Cast ==
- Norman Kerry as Maurice Stair
- Claire Windsor as Deirdre Saurin
- Arthur Edmund Carewe as Maj. Anthony Kinsella
- Tom Guise as Marquis de Stair
- Helene Sullivan as Judy Saurin
- Nelson McDowell as Scout MacBourney
- Larry Steers as Captain Rockwood
- J. Gordon Russell as wagon driver
- Myrta Bonillas as Saba Rockwood
- Jacques d'Auray as Richard Saurin
- Pauline Neff as Nonie Valetta
- Bertram Johns as Doctor Harriatt
- Billie Bennett as Mrs Harriatt
- Annie Ryan as Mrs MacBourney
- Dick Sutherland as Chief Loguenbuela

== Preservation ==
A print of The Claw is housed at the BFI National Archive in London.
