= The Claw (novel) =

1911 novel

The Claw is a 1911 novel by Cynthia Stockley. Set in Colonial South Africa and Zimbabwe, the work follows the adventures of an eighteen-year-old girl who was born in South Africa to Irish parents. From South Africa she travels to Mashonaland in a time of political unrest when there is an uprising of the Matabele people. The novel was adapted into a silent film twice.

== Film adaptations ==
- The Claw (1918, Select Pictures)
- The Claw (1927, Universal Pictures)
