= List of films shot in Sonora, California =

A list of films and television series shot in or near the city of Sonora, a historic Gold Rush mining town in the Sierra Nevada foothills and Tuolumne County, California.

== List ==
- The A-Team (1983) TV Series
- A Woman Called Moses (1978)
- The Adventures of Brisco County, Jr. (1993)
- Against All Odds (1924)
- Alex & the Gypsy (1976)
- The American Short Story (1976)
- Another 48 Hrs. (1990)
- Apache (1954)
- The Apple Dumpling Gang Rides Again (1979)
- Back to the Future Part III (1990)
- Baby Doll (1956)
- Bad Girls (1994/I)
- Bad Men of Missouri (1941)
- Behind the Mask of Zorro (2005)
- Belle Starr (1980)
- The Best Bad Man (1925)
- The Big Country (1958)
- The Big Land (1957)
- The Big Valley (1965) TV Series
- Blood Red (1988)
- Bonanza (1959) TV Series
- Bonanza: The Return (1993)
- Booker (1984)
- The Border Legion (1918)
- The Border Legion (1930)
- Bound for Glory (1976)
- The Branding Iron (1920)
- The Brothers (2006)
- Bullwhip (1958)
- California Conquest (1951)
- The Call of the Wild (1935)
- Casey Jones (1957) TV Series
- Cat Story (1988)
- Catch My Smoke (1922)
- The Charge of the Light Brigade (1936)
- Chattanooga Choo Choo (1983)
- The Cimarron Kid (1951)
- Cimarron Strip (1967) TV Series
- Come Live with Me (1941)
- Conflict (1936)
- The Conquering Horde (1931)
- The Conquerors (1932)
- The County Chairman (1935)
- The Covered Wagon (1923)
- Day of the Animals (1977)
- Death Valley Days (1953) TV Series
- The Deputies (Law of the Land) (1976) TV Series
- Dirty Mary, Crazy Larry (1974)
- Dodge City (1939)
- Down Rio Grande Way (1942)
- Downwardly Mobile (1996)
- Drums of the Deep South (1951)
- Duel in the Sun (1946)
- Dundee and the Culhane (1967) TV Series
- East of Eden (1981)
- The Eagle's Talons (1923)
- The F.B.I. (1965) TV Series
- Face of a Fugitive (1959)
- The Farmer Takes a Wife (1935)
- Fast Charlie... the Moonbeam Rider (1979)
- Father Murphy (1982) TV Series
- Fighting Caravans (1931)
- Finian's Rainbow (1968)
- Flying Lariats (1931)
- For Whom the Bell Tolls (1943)
- The Galloping Ace (1924)
- Girl of the Limberlost (1934)
- Go West (1940)
- Go West Young Dog (1977)
- The Great Bank Robbery (1969)
- The Great Man's Whiskers (1969)
- The Great Meadow (1931)
- The Great Northfield Minnesota Raid (1972)
- The Great Race (1965)
- Gold Rush (2006)
- The Great Missouri Raid (1951)
- Guest of Cindy Sherman (2008)
- Gunsmoke (1971) TV Series
- The Half-Breed (1916)
- The Hazards of Helen (1914)
- Hidalgo (2004)
- High Noon (1952)
- Highway to Heaven (1984) TV Series
- Hills of Home (1948)
- Honkytonk Man (1982)
- Hopalong Cassidy (television series, 1952)
- If You Believe It, It's So (1922)
- In Old Chicago (1937)
- Indiana Jones and the Last Crusade (1989)
- The Iron Horse (1966)
- The Inventing of America (1975)
- Ishi: The Last of His Tribe (1978)
- I've Got You (2026)
- Jack Slade (1953)
- Joe Dancer: The Big Trade (1981)
- Joe Hill (1971)
- The Johnstown Flood (1926)
- Kansas Pacific (1952)
- Kate Bliss and the Ticker Tape Kid (1978)
- Kenny Rogers as The Gambler (1980)
- Kenny Rogers as The Gambler: The Adventure Continues (1983)
- Kidschool (2001)
- The Kissing Bandit (1948)
- Lacey and the Mississippi Queen (1978)
- Lasca of the Rio Grande (1931)
- Lassie (1961) TV Series
- The Last of His Tribe (1992)
- The Last Ride of the Dalton Gang (1979) (TV)
- The Legend of Jesse James (1965) TV Series
- Let Me Tell You A Song (1972)
- Libeled Lady (1936)
- Little House on the Prairie (1974) TV Series
- Locked Doors (1925)
- Lone Cowboy (1933)
- The Lone Ranger (1956) TV Series
- The Long Riders (1980)
- The Love Bug (1969)
- Mail Order Bride (1964)
- A Man Called Gannon (1968)
- Man From Shiloh (1970) TV Series
- The Man from U.N.C.L.E. (1967) TV Series
- Man of Conquest (1939)
- Man of the West (1958)
- Man Power (1927)
- The Man Who Won (1923)
- Maxie (1984)
- Money! Money! Money! (1923)
- The Moonlighter (1953)
- Mountain Justice (1937)
- My Little Chickadee (1940)
- Nichols (1971) TV Series
- Nickelodeon (1976)
- The Night Rider (1979)
- No One's Watching: An Alien Abductee's Story (2006)
- No Place to Run (1972)
- North of 36 (1924)
- North of the Rio Grande (1937)
- Not a Drum Was Heard (1924)
- Oklahoma Crude (1973)
- The Omaha Trail (1942)
- The Outrage (1964)
- Over the Hill (1931)
- Overland Trails (1948)
- Overland Trail (1960) TV Series
- Ox Train (1952)
- The Painted Hills (1951)
- Pale Rider (1984)
- Paradise (1988) TV Series
- Passion (1954)
- The Perils of Pauline (1967)
- Petticoat Junction (1963)
- Pierre of the Plains (1942)
- The Prisoner of Zenda (1937)
- Promises (1998)
- Radio Flyer (1992)
- Rage at Dawn (1955)
- The Raiders (1932)
- The Rare Breed (1966)
- Rawhide (1960) TV Series
- The Red Glove (1919)
- The Red House (1947)
- The Red Pony (1973) (TV)
- Redemption of the Ghost (2002)
- The Return of Frank James (1940)
- Riders of the Cactus (1931)
- The Right of Way (1931)
- The Robin Hood of El Dorado (1936)
- Rose Marie (1936)
- The Romance of Rosy Ridge (1947)
- Roseanna McCoy (1949)
- Rustlers' Valley (1937)
- The Sacketts (1979) (TV)
- San Antone (1953)
- Santa Fe Trail (1940)
- Sawyer and Finn (1983)
- Scalplock (1965)
- Scarlet Days (1919)
- Scars of Jealousy (1923)
- Scouts to the Rescue (1939)
- Scudda Hoo! Scudda Hay! (1948)
- Seven Brides for Seven Brothers (1982) TV Series
- Seven Wonders of The Industrial World: The Line (2003)
- The Shadow Riders (1982) (TV)
- Shaughnessy (1996) (TV)
- Sierra Passage (1951)
- The Silent Call (1921)
- Silver City (1951)
- The Silver Whip (1953)
- Singer Jim McKee (1924)
- Slither (1973)
- Something for a Lonely Man (1968)
- Somewhere in Sonora (1933)
- Son of Slade (1955)
- The Song of the Lark (2001)
- Songs and Saddles (1938)
- Stampede (1949)
- Tales of Wells Fargo (1957) TV Series
- The Terror (1920)
- Terror in a Texas Town (1958)
- Tess of the Storm Country (1960)
- The Texan (1930)
- Texas Lady (1955)
- The Texas Rangers (1951)
- Three Bad Men (2005)
- Three Wishes (2005) TV Series
- Timber Stampede (1939)
- The Timber Wolf (1925)
- Toast of New York (1937)
- The Toll Gate (1920)
- Trail Dust (1936)
- The Trail Rider (1925)
- Traveling Salesman (1921)
- True Tales (1991) TV Series
- Two Alone (1934)
- Unforgiven (1992)
- Union Pacific (1939)
- The Virginian (1929)
- Wagon Wheels (1934)
- The West of the Imagination (1986)
- Wells Fargo (1937)
- When the Daltons Rode (1940)
- Where the Wind Dies (1954)
- Whispering Smith (1948)
- White-Collar Crime (1996)
- Wichita (1955)
- The Wild Wild West (1964) TV Series
- Without Compromise (1922)
- The World's Greatest Lover (1977)
- Wyoming (1940)
- Wyoming Mail (1950)
- The Young Riders (1969) TV Series
- Young Tom Edison (1940)
- The Other Kids (2016)

== See also ==
- Films shot in California
- Mining communities of the California Gold Rush
