= Ridgwell Cullum =

British writer

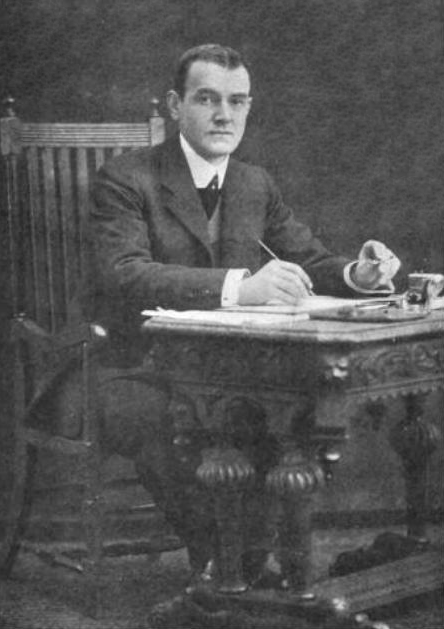
- In The Bookman, May 1908
- Born: Sidney Groves Burghard; 13 August 1867; London, England
- Died: 3 November 1943 (aged 76); Torquay, Devon, England
- Occupation: Writer

Ridgwell Cullum (pseudonym of Sidney Groves Burghard; 13 August 1867 – 3 November 1943) was a British writer who wrote a large number of adventure novels over more than 30 years, usually set in sparsely populated regions of the United States or Canada.

== Biography ==
Sidney Groves Burghard was born in London on 13 August 1867. He left home aged 17 to join a gold rush in the Transvaal in South Africa, where he became involved in the conflict between British and Boer settlers. Later he travelled to the scene of another gold rush in Yukon in north-west Canada and spent a number of years cattle-ranching in Montana, United States.

His first novel The Devil's Keg, set in Alberta, Canada, was published in 1903. After its success he settled in Britain and became a full-time writer. Several of his novels were made into films.

He died in Torquay on 3 November 1943.

== Works ==
- The Devil's Keg (US: The Story of the Foss River Ranch) (1903)
- The Hound from the North (1904) (also in Project Gutenberg)
- In the Brooding Wild (1905) (Also at Project Gutenberg)
- The Night Riders (1906) – made into a film (1920) (Also at Project Gutenberg)
- The Watchers of the Plains (1908) (Also on Project Gutenberg.)
- The Compact (1909)
- The Sheriff of Dyke Hole (1909)
- The Trail of the Axe (1910) – made into a film (1922), featuring Dustin Farnum and George Fisher
- The One-Way Trail (1911) (Also on Project Gutenberg)
- The Twins of Suffering Creek (1912) – made into two films, Twins of Suffering Creek (1920), featuring William Russell, and The Man Who Won (1923), directed by William A. Wellman and featuring Dustin Farnum, Jacqueline Gadsden and Lloyd Whitlock
- The Golden Woman (1913)
- The Way of the Strong (1914) – made into a film (1919), directed by Edwin Carewe and featuring Anna Q. Nilsson, Joe King and Harry Northrup
- The Law-Breakers (1914)
- The Son of his Father (1915) – made into a film (1917) directed by Victor Schertzinger and featuring Charles Ray, Vola Vale and Robert McKim (Also at Project Gutenberg)
- The Men Who Wrought (1916)
- The Triumph of John Kars (1917)
- The Purchase Price (US: The Forfeit) (1917) – made into a film The Forfeit (1919), directed by Frank Powell and featuring House Peters Sr.
- The Law of the Gun (1918)
- The Heart of Unaga (1920)
- The Man in the Twilight (1922)
- The Luck of the Kid (1923)
- The Saint of the Speedway (1924)
- The Riddle of Three-Way Creek (1925)
- The Candy Man (US: Child Of The North) (1926)
- The Wolf Pack (1927)
- The Mystery of the Barren Lands (1928)
- The Tiger of Cloud River (1929)
- The Treasure of Big Waters (1930)
- The Bull Moose (1931)
- Sheets in the Wind (1932)
- The Flaming Wildness (1934)
- The Vampire of N'Gobi (1935)
- One Who Kills (1938)
