= The Desert Bride =

The Desert Bride may refer to:

- The Desert Bride (1928 film), an American film
- The Desert Bride (2017 film), an Argentine-Chilean film
