= Black Tears (disambiguation) =

"Black Tears" is a song by Australian alternative rock band Powderfinger.

Black Tears may also refer to:

- Black Tears (short story)
- Black Tears (1927 film)
- Black Tears (1998 film)
- "Black Tears", song by Imelda May from Life Love Flesh Blood
- "Black Tears", song by Edge of Sanity from Purgatory Afterglow
- "Black Tears", song by Jason Aldean from Night Train
