= The Man Who Waited =

1922 film

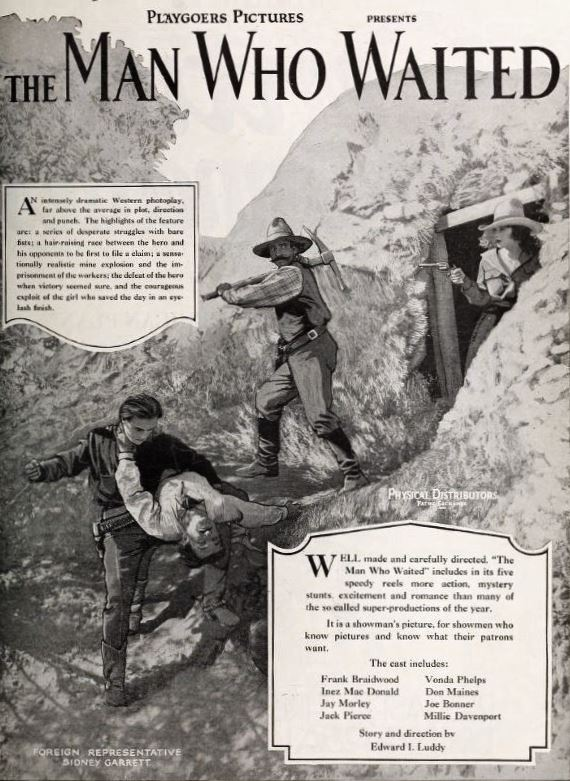
- Directed by: Edward Ludwig
- Written by: Edward Ludwig
- Starring: Jay Morley; Vonda Phelps; Milla Davenport
- Production company: Jacob Wilk Productions
- Distributed by: Playgoers Pictures
- Release date: November 19, 1922
- Running time: 50 minutes
- Country: United States
- Languages: Silent; English intertitles

The Man Who Waited is a 1922 American silent Western film directed by Edward Ludwig and starring Jay Morley, Vonda Phelps and Milla Davenport.

== Cast ==
- Frank Braidwood as Frank Magee
- Inez MacDonald as June Rance
- Jay Morley asJoe Rance
- Jack P. Pierce as Black Pete
- Vonda Phelps as June, as a baby
- Dan Maines as Sandy
- Joe Bonner as Manuel Sánchez
- Milla Davenport as Madre Sánchez

== Bibliography ==
- Connelly, Robert B. The Silents: Silent Feature Films, 1910-36, Volume 40, Issue 2. December Press, 1998.
- Munden, Kenneth White. The American Film Institute Catalog of Motion Pictures Produced in the United States, Part 1. University of California Press, 1997.
