= The Secret of Black Mountain =

1917 film

- Directed by: Otto Hoffman
- Written by: Jackson Gregory
- Produced by: Falcon Features; H. M. Horkheimer; E. D. Horkheimer
- Starring: Vola Vale; Philo McCullough
- Distributed by: General Film Company
- Release date: September 29, 1917
- Running time: 4 reels; 40 minutes
- Country: United States
- Languages: Silent; English intertitles

The Secret of Black Mountain is a 1917 silent film western short directed by Otto Hoffman and starring Vola Vale.

An incomplete print is preserved in the Library of Congress collection.

== Cast ==
- Vola Vale - Miriam Vale
- Philo McCullough - Blake Stanley
- Charles Dudley - Ed Stanley
- George Austin - George Cooper (* as Frank Austin)
- Henry Crawford - Barton
- Mignon LeBrun - Sarah Stanley
- James Warner - Henry Stanley
- Lewis King - Jake DeWitt
- Jack McLaughlin - Jim Vale
- Gibson Gowland - Jack Rance
- H. C. Russell - Old Bill
