= Playgoers Pictures =

American film company

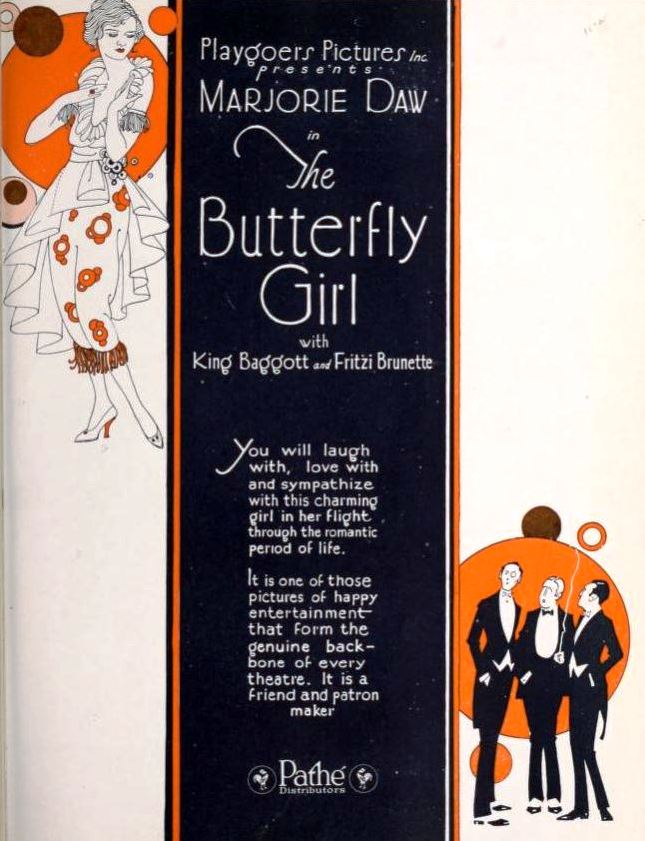
Poster for The Butterfly Girl (1921)

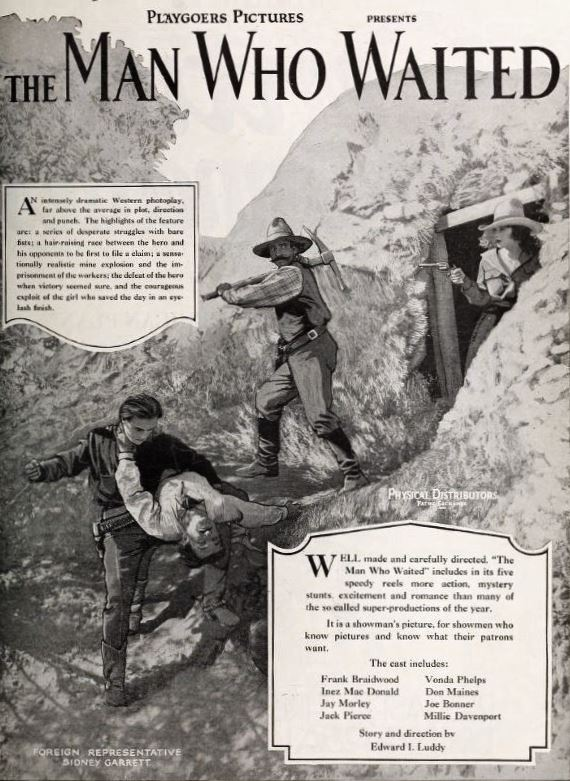
Poster for The Man Who Waited (1922)

Playgoers Pictures was an American film production and distribution company active between 1921 and 1923 during the silent era. Unlike many other independent companies it concentrated on a variety of genres rather than just westerns. The 1921 film Tropical Love was one of the first to be shot in Puerto Rico. It also released several British films including The Pauper Millionaire. Norma Shearer starred in the 1923 film A Clouded Name while other actors appearing in the company's films include Dolores Cassinelli, Marjorie Daw, Fred Niblo, Lillian Lorraine, Wyndham Standing, Noah Beery, Dorothy Mackaill and Reginald Denny.

== Selected filmography ==
- The Butterfly Girl (1921)
- Discontented Wives (1921)
- The Ruse of the Rattler (1921)
- Home-Keeping Hearts (1921)
- Forbidden Love (1921)
- They Shall Pay (1921)
- The Family Closet (1921)
- Father Tom (1921)
- Across the Divide (1921)
- Tropical Love (1921)
- Anne of Little Smoky (1921)
- A Pasteboard Crown (1922)
- Hills of Missing Men (1922)
- Sunshine Harbor (1922)
- The Man Who Waited (1922)
- Lonesome Corners (1922)
- Face to Face (1922)
- The Bootlegger's Daughter (1922)
- The Pauper Millionaire (1922)
- The Inner Man (1922)
- The Man She Brought Back (1922)
- Isle of Doubt (1922)
- Her Majesty (1922)
- Counterfeit Love (1923)
- A Clouded Name (1923)
- Tipped Off (1923)

== Bibliography ==
- García-Crespo, Naida. Early Puerto Rican Cinema and Nation Building: National Sentiments, Transnational Realities, 1897-1940. Rutgers University Press, 2019.
- Langman, Larry. A Guide to Silent Westerns. Greenwood Publishing Group, 1992.
- Langman, Larry & Finn, Daniel. A Guide to American Silent Crime Films. Greenwood Press, 1994.
- Munden, Kenneth White. The American Film Institute Catalog of Motion Pictures Produced in the United States, Part 1. University of California Press, 1997.
- Soister, John T., Nicolella, Henry & Joyce, Steve. American Silent Horror, Science Fiction and Fantasy Feature Films, 1913-1929. McFarland, 2014.
