= Isle of Doubt =

1922 silent film

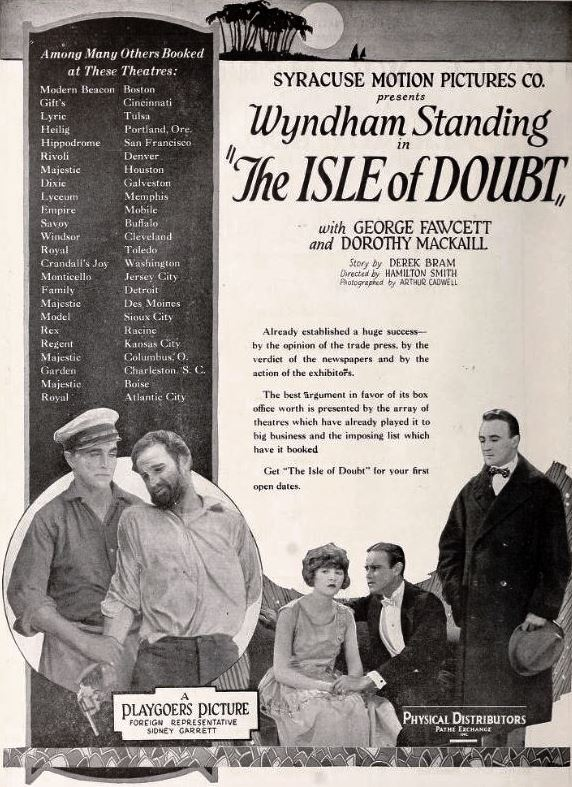
- Directed by: Hamilton Smith
- Written by: Derek Bram
- Starring: Wyndham Standing; Dorothy Mackaill; George Fawcett
- Production company: Syracuse Motion Pictures Company
- Distributed by: Playgoers Pictures
- Release date: September 10, 1922
- Running time: 60 minutes
- Country: United States
- Languages: Silent; English intertitles

Isle of Doubt is a 1922 American silent drama film directed by Hamilton Smith and starring Wyndham Standing, Dorothy Mackaill and George Fawcett. The title is sometimes written as The Isle of Doubt.

== Cast ==
- Wyndham Standing as Dean Deland
- Dorothy Mackaill as Eleanor Warburton
- George Fawcett as Burton J. Warburton
- Marie Burke as Mrs. Warburton
- Warner Richmond as Gerry Patten
- Arthur Dewey as Bill Hardy

== Bibliography ==
- Munden, Kenneth White. The American Film Institute Catalog of Motion Pictures Produced in the United States, Part 1. University of California Press, 1997.
