= The Son of His Father =

1917 silent film by Victor Schertzinger

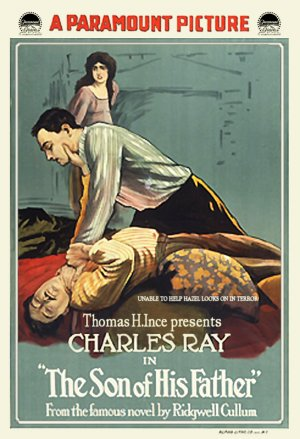
- Theatrical release poster
- Directed by: Victor Schertzinger
- Screenplay by: Ridgwell Cullum (story)
- Based on: The Son of His Father by Ridgwell Cullum
- Produced by: Thomas H. Ince
- Starring: Charles Ray; Vola Vale; Robert McKim; George Nichols; Charles K. French; J. P. Lockney
- Production company: Thomas H. Ince Productions
- Distributed by: Paramount Pictures
- Release date: October 22, 1917
- Running time: 50 minutes
- Country: United States
- Language: Silent (English intertitles)

The Son of His Father is a 1917 American silent drama film directed by Victor Schertzinger and written by Ridgwell Cullum. The film stars Charles Ray, Vola Vale, Robert McKim, George Nichols, Charles K. French, and J. P. Lockney. The film was released on October 22, 1917, by Paramount Pictures.

== Plot ==
As described in a film magazine, Gordon Carbhoy, the spoiled son of wealthy father James Carbhoy who owns several railroads, is sent out by his father to turn $5,000 into $100,000, which the son claimed to be able to do. Gordon meets Silas Mallinsbee at Buffalo Falls, where the son is eager to have the railroad build a station at that point. Mallinsbee cannot come to an agreement with David Slosson, the representative of Gordon's father. Gordon takes things into his own hands and makes a captive of Slosson. When his father shows up, Gordon takes him captive also. Using his father's code, Gordon orders a train crew to come to Buffalo Falls and construction of the station begins. After work is well underway, Gordon brings his report to his father, who is proud of his son. By then the little love affair between Gordon and Hazel, daughter of Mallinsbee, comes to a head, and Hazel promises to become Gordon's wife.

== Cast ==
- Charles Ray as Gordon Carbhoy
- Vola Vale as Hazel Mallinsbee
- Robert McKim as David Slosson
- George Nichols as Silas Mallinsbee
- Charles K. French as James Carbhoy
- J. P. Lockney as Peter McSwain
- Harry Yamamoto as Hi Plee
- Otto Hoffman as Harker

== Reception ==
Like many American films of the time, The Son of His Father was subject to cuts by city and state film censorship boards. The Chicago Board of Censors required cuts of scenes of striking man over the head, struggle scene with girl and that part of the third scene where man kisses girl and drags her to door, and two closeups of wounded man in fight.

== Survival status ==
Copies of the film are held in the Library of Congress film archive and the UCLA Film and Television Archive.
