= Finnegan's Ball =

1927 film

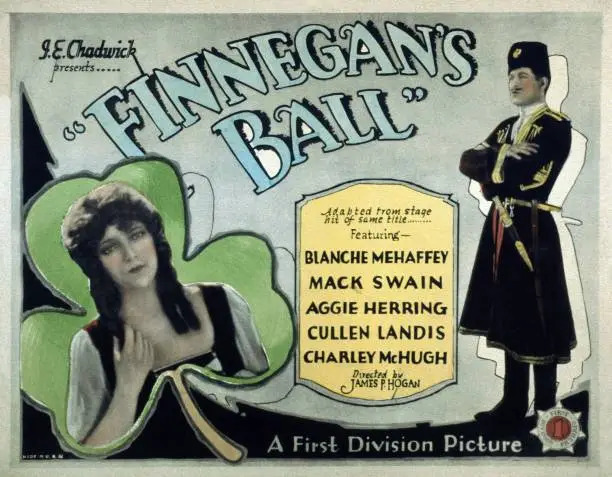
- Directed by: James P. Hogan
- Written by: Max Graf
- Based on: Finnegan's Ball by George H. Emerick
- Produced by: Max Graf
- Starring: Blanche Mehaffey; Mack Swain; Cullen Landis
- Cinematography: Blake Wagner
- Production company: Graf Brothers Studio
- Distributed by: First Division Pictures
- Release date: September 15, 1927
- Running time: 70 minutes
- Country: United States
- Languages: Silent; English intertitles

Finnegan's Ball is a 1927 American silent comedy film directed by James P. Hogan and starring Blanche Mehaffey, Mack Swain and Cullen Landis. It is based on an 1894 Broadway play of the same title.

== Synopsis ==
The Finnegan family emigrate from Ireland to the United States, but get into a dispute with their neighbors the Flannigans. The Finnegans mistakenly believe they have inherited a large fortune and become very snobbish, but all is resolved by a marriage between the two families.

== Cast ==
- Blanche Mehaffey as Molly Finnegan
- Mack Swain as Patrick Flannigan
- Cullen Landis as Flannigan Jr
- Aggie Herring as Maggie Finnegan
- Charles McHugh as Danny Finnegan Sr
- Westcott Clarke as Lawyer O'Connell
- Kewpie Morgan as Judge Morgan
- Mimi Finnegan as Danny Finnegan Jr
- Harry Bowen as Cop

== Bibliography ==
- Connelly, Robert B. The Silents: Silent Feature Films, 1910-36, Volume 40, Issue 2. December Press, 1998.
- Munden, Kenneth White. The American Film Institute Catalog of Motion Pictures Produced in the United States, Part 1. University of California Press, 1997.
