= Mothers-in-Law =

1923 silent film

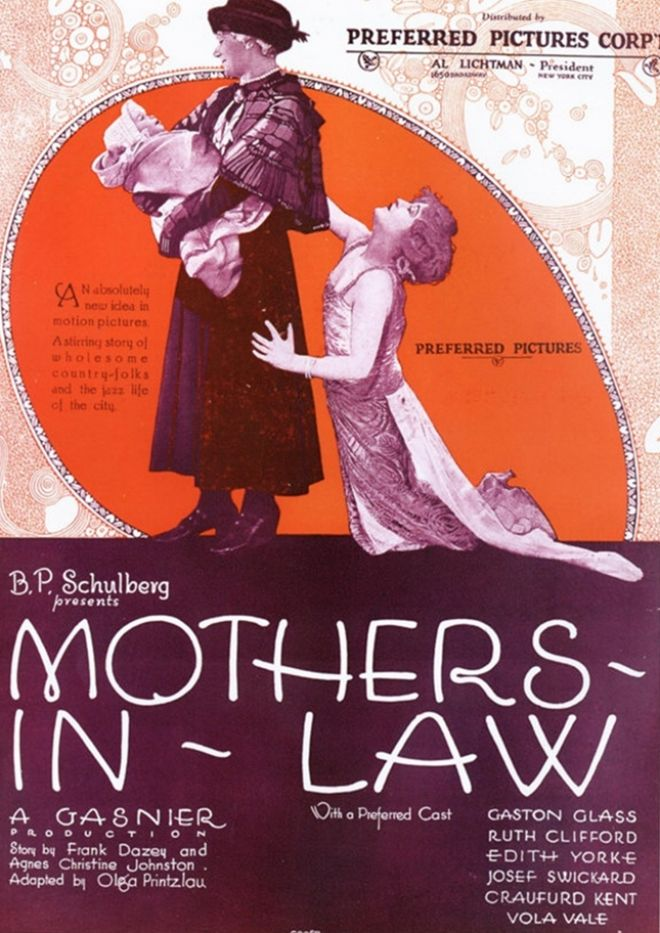
- Directed by: Louis J. Gasnier
- Written by: Frank Mitchell Dazey; Agnes Christine Johnston; Olga Printzlau
- Produced by: B.P. Schulberg
- Starring: Ruth Clifford; Gaston Glass; Vola Vale
- Cinematography: Karl Struss
- Production company: B.P. Schulberg Productions
- Distributed by: Preferred Pictures
- Release date: September 9, 1923
- Running time: 70 minutes
- Country: United States
- Language: Silent (English intertitles)

Mothers-in-Law is a 1923 American silent drama film directed by Louis J. Gasnier and starring Ruth Clifford, Gaston Glass, and Vola Vale.

== Cast ==
- Ruth Clifford as Vianna Courtleigh
- Gaston Glass as David Wingate
- Vola Vale as Ina Phillips
- Crauford Kent as Alden Van Buren
- Josef Swickard as Newton Wingate
- Edith Murgatroyd as 'Mom' Wingate

== Bibliography ==
- Munden, Kenneth White. The American Film Institute Catalog of Motion Pictures Produced in the United States, Part 1. University of California Press, 1997.
