= Why Women Remarry =

1923 film

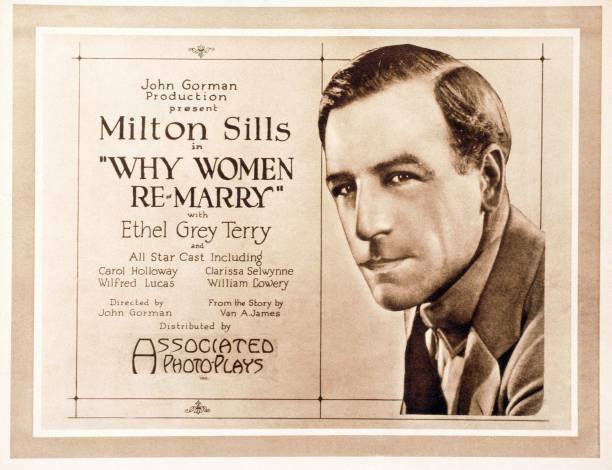
- Directed by: John Gorman
- Written by: Van A. James
- Produced by: John Gorman
- Starring: Milton Sills; Ethel Grey Terry; William Lowery
- Production company: John Gorman Productions
- Distributed by: Associated Photoplays
- Release date: October 30, 1923
- Running time: 50 minutes
- Country: United States
- Languages: Silent; English intertitles

Why Women Remarry is a 1923 American silent crime drama film directed by John Gorman and starring Milton Sills, Ethel Grey Terry and William Lowery.

== Synopsis ==
Martin Talbot, a heavy gambler who mistreats his family is murdered. The man who is blamed for it is in fact innocent, as a policeman is able to establish. However, all the wives connected with the case remarry to start new lives.

== Cast ==
- Milton Sills as Dan Hannon
- Ethel Grey Terry as Mary Talbot
- William Lowery as Martin Tablot
- Marion Feducha as Jimmy Talbot
- Jeanne Carpenter as Mildred Talbot
- Wilfred Lucas as Mr. Compton
- Clarissa Selwynne as Mrs. Compton
- James Barton as Don Compton
- Anita Simons as Mrs. McKinnon
- George 'Gabby' Hayes as Tuck McKinnon
- Tom McGuire as Robert Milton
- Bud Geary as Billy
- Carol Holloway as Dan Hannon's sister
- Westcott Clarke as Dan Hannon's sister's first husband
- Robert Walker as Dan Hannon's sister's second husband

== Bibliography ==
- Connelly, Robert B. The Silents: Silent Feature Films, 1910-36, Volume 40, Issue 2. December Press, 1998.
- Munden, Kenneth White. The American Film Institute Catalog of Motion Pictures Produced in the United States, Part 1. University of California Press, 1997.
