= The Pauper Millionaire =

1921 film

- Directed by: Frank Hall Crane
- Written by: Eliot Stannard
- Based on: The Pauper Millionaire by Austin Fryers
- Starring: C. M. Hallard; Katherine Blair; Norma Whalley; Polly Emery
- Production company: Ideal Film Company
- Distributed by: Ideal Film Company; Playgoers Pictures (US)
- Release date: 1922
- Running time: 5 reels
- Country: United Kingdom
- Language: Silent (English intertitles)

The Pauper Millionaire is a 1922 British silent comedy film directed by Frank Hall Crane and starring C. M. Hallard, Katherine Blair, and John H. Roberts. It was based on a novel by Austin Fryers.

== Plot ==
As described in a film magazine, American millionaire John Pye Smith (Hallard) secretly sails for England with the intention of investigating the young woman his son Harry (Roberts) insists on marrying, concerned she may be a gold digger. An accident deprives him of his valet, without whose trained aid he is singularly helpless. In London, while waiting for a train, his beard is shaved off. A porter refuses to give him his suitcase, not recognizing him as its bearded owner. He goes on without it and then discovers that it contained his passport, money, and bankbook. After his trunk is stolen, no one believes his story of misfortune, and he is stranded in London. After undergoing several hardships, he tries to get work and accepts charity from drunken old Sally (Emery) and gets a job washing windows. He falls from a ladder and, injured, is taken to a hospital. There matters mend when his nurse turns out to be Hilda Martin (Blair), the young woman his son intends to wed. She has a cable from his Harry to the effect that he and his mother (Whalley) are sailing to England. His troubles at an end, John Pye Smith accepts Hilda as his future daughter-in-law.

== Cast ==
- C. M. Hallard as John Pye Smith
- Katherine Blair as Hilda Martin
- John H. Roberts as Harry Smith
- Norma Whalley as Mrs. Smith
- George Goodwin as Crook
- Polly Emery as Sally
