= Strange Idols =

1922 film directed by Bernard Durning

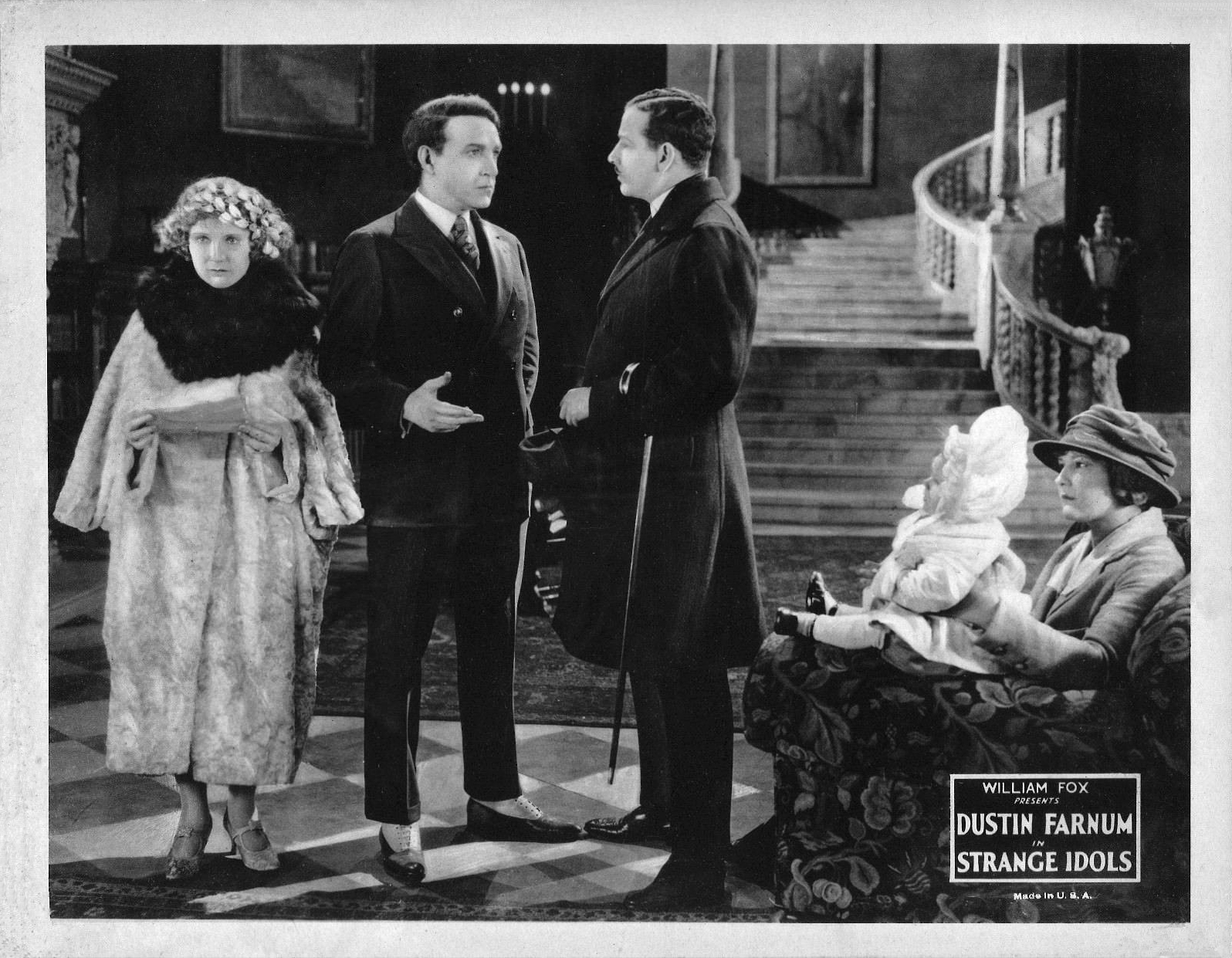
- Lobby card
- Directed by: Bernard Durning
- Screenplay by: Jules Furthman
- Story by: Emil Forst
- Starring: Dustin Farnum; Doris Pawn; Philo McCullough; Richard Tucker
- Cinematography: Don Short
- Production company: Fox Film Corporation
- Distributed by: Fox Film Corporation
- Release date: May 28, 1922
- Running time: 50 minutes
- Country: United States
- Language: Silent (English intertitles)

Strange Idols is a 1922 American drama film directed by Bernard Durning and written by Jules Furthman. The film stars Dustin Farnum, Doris Pawn, Philo McCullough, and Richard Tucker. The film was released on May 28, 1922, by Fox Film Corporation.

== Plot ==
As described in a film magazine, Canadian lumberman Angus MacDonald (Farnum) falls in love at first sight with New York cabaret dancer Ruth Mayo (Pawn) and marries her. Following his hasty marriage, he takes his bride back to the Canadian woods where his financial interests are centered. Ruth, however, longs for New York City and, to keep the peace, they move back to the City where a child is born to them. A strike at the lumber camp takes Angus back to Canada, and during his absence Doris takes the child for a tour of Europe with her old dance partner Ted Raymond (McCullough). Six years later Angus discovers his daughter is the big attraction in the same Broadway cabaret where he met her mother. He rescues her from the midnight show and they go to a hotel where Doris meets them, and there is a reconciliation.

== Cast ==
- Dustin Farnum as Angus MacDonald
- Doris Pawn as Ruth Mayo
- Philo McCullough as Ted Raymond
- Richard Tucker as Malcolm Sinclair
- Vonda Phelps as Daughter at 7 Years Old

== Preservation ==
With no prints of Strange Idols located in any film archives, it is a lost film.

== See also ==
- List of lost films
- 1937 Fox vault fire
