= Code of the Northwest =

1926 film

- Directed by: Frank S. Mattison
- Written by: Frank S. Mattison
- Starring: Tom London; Frank Austin; Shirley Palmer
- Cinematography: Elmer Dyer
- Production company: Chesterfield Pictures
- Distributed by: Associated Exhibitors
- Release date: July 25, 1926
- Running time: 50 minutes
- Country: United States
- Languages: Silent; English intertitles

Code of the Northwest is a 1926 American silent Western film directed by Frank S. Mattison and starring Tom London, Frank Austin and Shirley Palmer.

== Plot ==
In Canada a Mountie is assisted by his police dog to bring in a wanted man.

== Cast ==
- Sandow the Dog as Sandow
- Richard Lang as Sgt. Jerry Tyler
- Tom London as Pvt. Frank Stafford
- Frank Austin as Sandy McKenna
- Shirley Palmer as Lorna McKenna
- Billy Franey as Posty McShanigan
- Eddie Brownell as Clay Hamilton
- Loraine Lamont as Jeanie McKenna
- Jack Richardson as Donald Stafford

== Bibliography ==
- Munden, Kenneth White. The American Film Institute Catalog of Motion Pictures Produced in the United States, Part 1. University of California Press, 1997. ISBN 9780520209695
