= Each to His Kind =

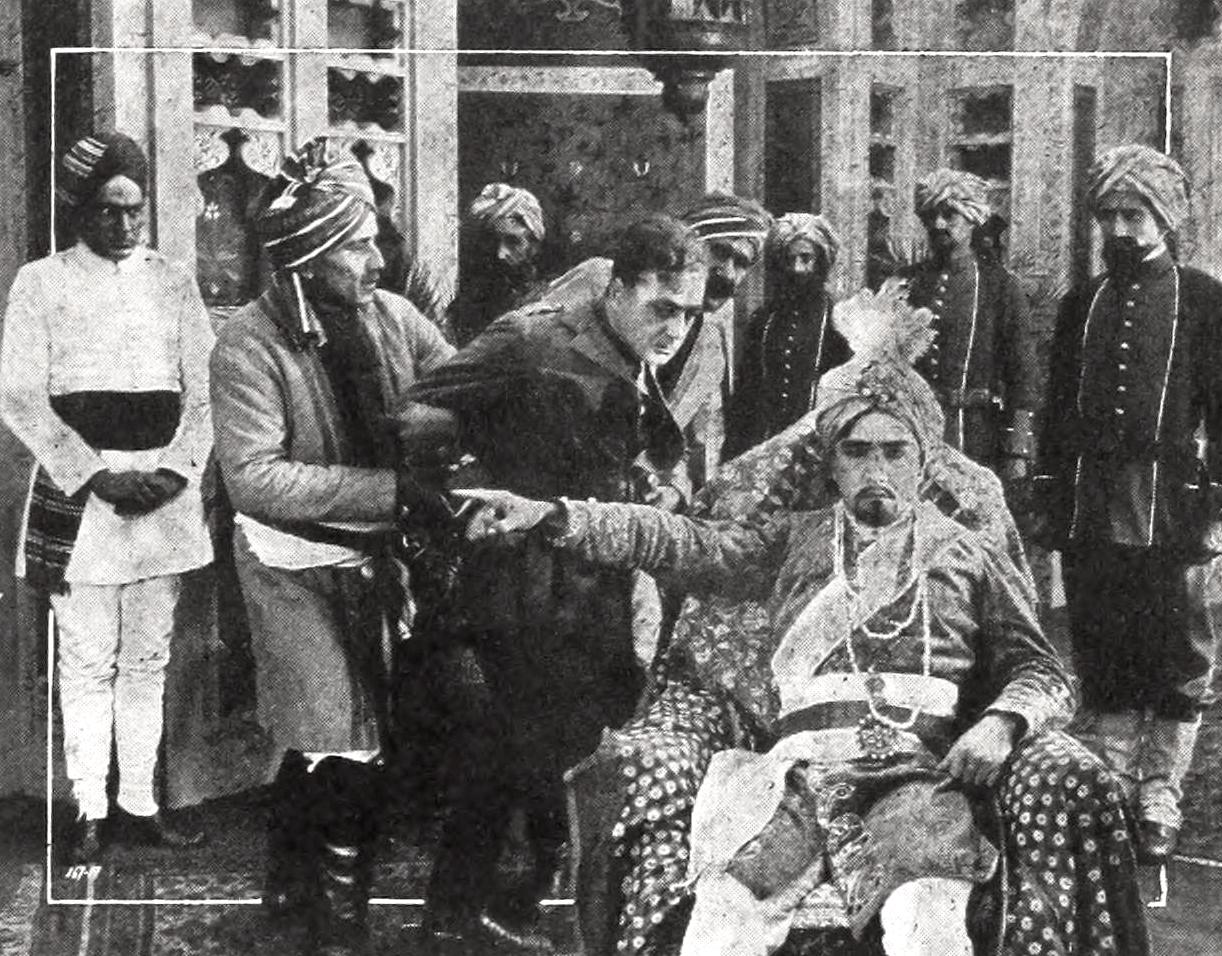
- Publicity photo
- Directed by: Edward LeSaint
- Screenplay by: George DuBois Proctor; Paul West
- Produced by: Jesse L. Lasky
- Starring: Sessue Hayakawa; Tsuru Aoki; Vola Vale; Ernest Joy; Eugene Pallette; Guy Oliver
- Cinematography: Allen M. Davey
- Production company: Jesse L. Lasky Feature Play Company
- Distributed by: Paramount Pictures
- Release date: February 5, 1917
- Running time: 50 minutes
- Country: United States
- Language: English

Each to His Kind is a 1917 American silent drama film directed by Edward LeSaint and written by George DuBois Proctor and Paul West. The film stars Sessue Hayakawa, Tsuru Aoki, Vola Vale, Ernest Joy, Eugene Pallette and Guy Oliver. The film was released on February 5, 1917, by Paramount Pictures.

== Plot ==
Heir to the Maharajah of Dharpuli, Rhandah leaves to study in England. Before leaving, he promises his eternal love to Princess Nada and she, as a token of love, gives him an amulet. In England, Amy Dawe, a rich girl, flirts with the prince because she has bet to get the amulet from him. Rhandah tries to hug Amy, but Dick Larimer, her boyfriend, warns him, reminding him that he's just a Hindu.

Back in India, Rhandah licks his wounds: embittered, he meditates revenge and Nada's attitude certainly does not help him, who rejects him not believing his assurances that he has always been faithful to her. The opportunity for revenge comes when Amy and Dick arrive in India and are taken prisoner during a riot. Rhandah, however, will yield to the pleas of Nada who, realizing that Amy is not her rival, now asks for mercy for the two Englishmen.

== Cast ==
- Sessue Hayakawa as Rhandah
- Tsuru Aoki as Princess Nada
- Vola Vale as Amy Dawe
- Ernest Joy as Col. Marcy
- Eugene Pallette as Dick Larimer
- Guy Oliver as Col. Dawe
- Walter Long as Mulai Singh
- Paul Weigel as Asa Judd
- Cecil Holland as The Maharajah

== Preservation ==
With no prints of Each to His Kind located in any film archives, it is considered a lost film.
