= A Clouded Name =

1923 film

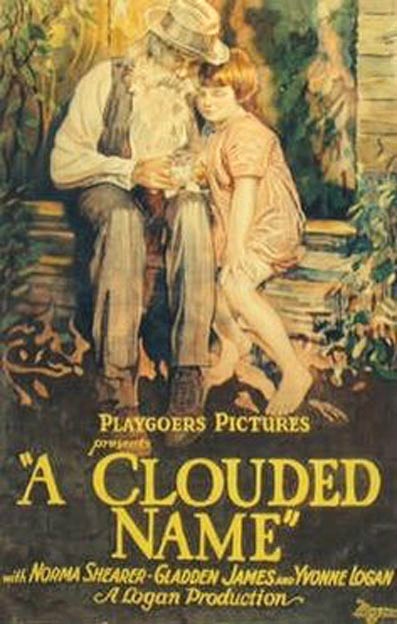
- Directed by: Austin O. Huhn
- Written by: Tom Bret
- Starring: Norma Shearer; Gladden James
- Cinematography: Jean Logan
- Production company: Logan Productions
- Distributed by: Playgoers Pictures
- Release date: February 18, 1923
- Running time: 52 minutes
- Country: United States
- Languages: Silent; English intertitles

A Clouded Name is a 1923 American silent drama film directed by Austin O. Huhn and starring Norma Shearer, Gladden James and Yvonne Logan. A print of A Clouded Name exists and is available on DVD.

== Cast ==
- Norma Shearer as Marjorie Dare
- Gladden James as Jim Allen
- Yvonne Logan as Smiles
- Richard Neill as Stewart Leighton
- Charles Miller as Sam Slocum
- Frederick Eckhart as Ben Tangleface
- Marion Bradley as Mrs. Davenport's maid
- Martha Langford as Mrs. Davenport

== Bibliography ==
- Jack Jacobs & Myron Braum. The films of Norma Shearer. A. S. Barnes, 1976.
