= John Gorman (director) =

American film director

John Gorman (1884–1936) was an American film director. He was born in Boston in 1884 and died in 1936.

Gorman directed 13 films.

== Partial filmography ==
- The Butterfly Girl (1921)
- Why Women Remarry (1923)
- Home Sweet Home (1926)
- The Prince of Broadway (1926)
- Black Tears (1927)
