= Vonda Phelps =

American actress and dancer (1915–2004)

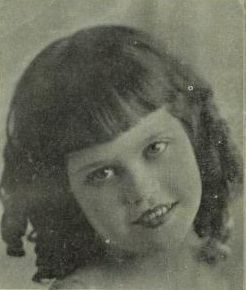
- Phelps in 1922
- Born: Avonda Maude Phelps; April 19, 1915; Shreveport, Louisiana, U.S.
- Died: September 2, 2004 (aged 89); Los Angeles, California, U.S.
- Spouse: Gerald Russell Hunsaker (m. 1940; died 1997)
- Parent(s): Rinaldo Abel Phelps (1872–1951); Lillian Maude Tiffin (1891–1983)

Avonda Maude Phelps (April 19, 1915 – September 2, 2004), credited as Vonda Phelps, was an American child stage actress, vaudeville performer and dancer in the 1920s. She appeared in four silent film productions in 1922 and 1923.

== Biography ==
Phelps was born on April 19, 1915, in Shreveport, Louisiana, to Rinaldo Abel Phelps (1872–1951) and Lillian Maude Tiffin (1891–1983).

In May 1924 Phelps participated in Good Fairy, a fantasy play in two acts, at the Philharmonic Auditorium in Los Angeles, California. She performed along with almost twenty other children. Phelps appeared as a dancer at the Christmas program of the Cosmos Club the following December. Her presentation was highlighted by a rendition of Pierrotte Phantasy. The dance was her original creation and demonstrated her unique personality. Phelps gave a similar interpretation of the dance at the Ambassador Theater in Los Angeles. Her performance was part of a concert given by The Children's Opera in June 1926.

Phelps appeared in four motion pictures in the early 1920s: in The Man Who Waited (1922), as "June", a baby, and in The Jungle Goddess (1922) as "Betty", a little girl, Strange Idols, as a girl at seven and Slippery McGee.

Her fame as a youth performer did not endure. She had a birthday luncheon in 1928 at the Elite on Hollywood Boulevard in Los Angeles. Guests were entertained at a table replete with a centerpiece of sweet peas rendered in pastel shades. Later the celebrants went to Grauman's Chinese Theater. Fellow silent film star Virginia Marshall was among Phelps' birthday attendants. In 1935 she spent twelve weeks dancing in Mexico at the Paris Inn Cafe. On December 7, 1940 in Alameda, California, she married Gerald Russell Hunsaker (1919–1997).

She died in Los Angeles, California, on September 2, 2004, at the age of 89.
