= Home Sweet Home (1926 film) =

1926 film

- Directed by: John Gorman; Roger Heman
- Written by: John Gorman
- Produced by: John Gorman; Paul Terry
- Starring: Mahlon Hamilton; Vola Vale
- Cinematography: James S. Brown
- Edited by: Alex Troffey
- Distributed by: Pathé Exchange
- Release date: December 24, 1926
- Running time: 55 minutes
- Country: USA
- Language: Silent..English titles

Home Sweet Home is a 1926 American silent drama film starring Mahlon Hamilton and Vola Vale. It was directed and produced by independent John Gorman and distributed through Pathé Exchange.

It is preserved in the Library of Congress collection.

== Cast ==
- Mahlon Hamilton
- Vola Vale
- Hugh Allan (actor)
- Lila Leslie
- Lillian Gilmore
- Archie Burke
- Ervin Renard
- J. D. Lockart
- Mildred Gregory
- S. D. Wilcox
