= Frank Austin (actor) =

American actor (1877–1954)

- Born: October 9, 1877; Mound City, Missouri, United States
- Died: May 13, 1954 (aged 76); Los Angeles, California, United States
- Occupation: Actor
- Years active: 1917–1950

George Francis Austin (October 9, 1877 – May 13, 1954) was an American film actor. He appeared in more than 120 films between 1917 and 1950. He died in Los Angeles on May 13, 1954, at age 76.

== Selected filmography ==
- The Secret of Black Mountain (1917)
- The Circus Cyclone (1925)
- The Desert Demon (1925)
- The Monster (1925)
- Snowed In (1926)
- Code of the Northwest (1926)
- Sweet Adeline (1926)
- The Terror (1928)
- The Desert Bride (1928)
- Court Martial (1928)
- The Drifter (1929)
- The Laurel-Hardy Murder Case (1930)
- Bad Girl (1931)
- The Range Feud (1931)
- Another Wild Idea (1934)
- Babes in Toyland (1934)
- Young Dynamite (1937)
- The Harvey Girls (1944)
- Jiggs and Maggie in Court (1948)
