= Harry Bowen (actor) =

American actor (1888–1941)

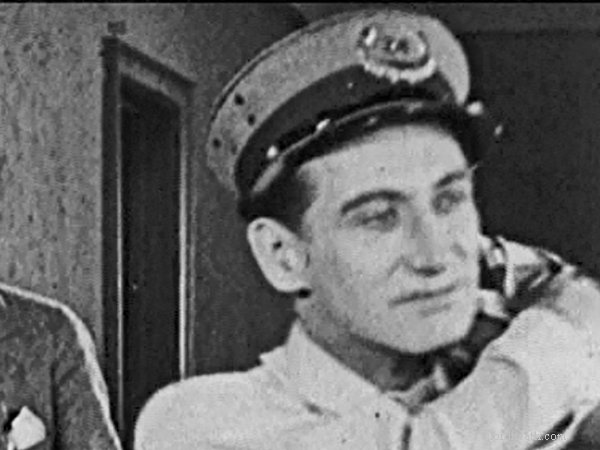
- Born: October 4, 1888; Brooklyn, New York
- Died: December 5, 1941 (aged 53); Los Angeles, California
- Occupation: Actor
- Years active: 1920–39

Harry Bowen (October 4, 1888 – December 5, 1941) was an American character actor of the silent and sound film eras. Born on October 4, 1888, in Brooklyn, New York, he broke into the film industry doing film shorts during the silent era. His work on shorts continued into talking pictures, and it was in 1929 that he made his first appearance in a full-length feature, with a small role in Red Hot Rhythm, directed by Leo McCarey. During his 20-year career, Bowen appeared in over 150 films, most of them film shorts, supporting comedians like Charley Chase, Edgar Kennedy and Laurel and Hardy. Other notable films in which he appeared include: the 1933 classic King Kong; Flying Down to Rio (1933), which was the first on-screen pairing of Fred Astaire and Ginger Rogers; John Ford's 1935 comedy, The Whole Town's Talking, starring Edward G. Robinson; and Next Time We Love (1936), starring Margaret Sullavan, James Stewart, and Ray Milland. His final screen performance, according to AFI, was the 1939 film, The Day the Bookies Wept, starring Joe Penner and Betty Grable.

Bowen died on December 5, 1941, at the age of 53 in Los Angeles, California.

== Selected filmography ==
- Finnegan's Ball (1927)
- Red Hot Rhythm (1929)
- King Kong (1933)
- Flying Down to Rio (1933)
- The Whole Town's Talking (1935)
- The Bohemian Girl (1936)
- The Moon's Our Home (1936)
- Next Time We Love (1936)
- The Day the Bookies Wept (1939)
