= Her Big Adventure =

1926 film

- Directed by: John Ince
- Written by: John Ince
- Produced by: John Ince
- Starring: Herbert Rawlinson; Grace Darmond; Vola Vale
- Production company: John Ince Productions
- Distributed by: A.G. Steen (state rights system)
- Release date: January 5, 1926
- Running time: 5 reels
- Country: United States
- Language: Silent (English intertitles)

Her Big Adventure is a 1926 American silent comedy drama film directed by John Ince and starring Herbert Rawlinson, Grace Darmond, and Vola Vale.

== Plot ==
As described in a film magazine review, Ralph Merriwell quarrels with his wealthy father, and decides to set out on his own, taking a bell hop job at a Los Angeles job. Betty Burton, who works for Ralph's father as a stenographer, wins a $1000 prize for an ad and goes to the hotel. She poses as Countess Fontaine and Ralph falls in love with her. Complications then ensue when the real Count and Countess Fontaine arrive at the hotel, as do some jewel thieves. By the end, Ralph is reconciled with his father and wins the affection of Betty.

== Cast ==
- Herbert Rawlinson as Ralph Merriwell
- Grace Darmond as Betty Burton
- Vola Vale as Countess Fontaine
- Carlton Griffin as Count Fontaine
- William H. Turner as Silas Merriwell
- Edward Gordon as Transatlantic Smith
- John J. Darby Minor Role (uncredited)

== Bibliography ==
- Munden, Kenneth White. The American Film Institute Catalog of Motion Pictures Produced in the United States, Part 1. University of California Press, 1997.
