= The Butterfly Girl =

1921 film

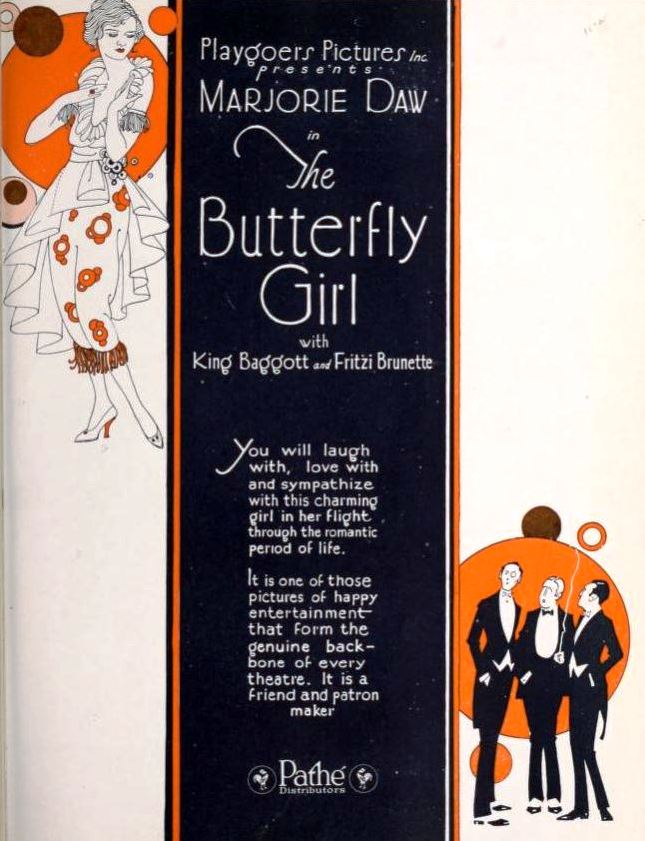
- Directed by: John Gorman
- Written by: John Gorman
- Starring: Marjorie Daw; Fritzi Brunette; King Baggot
- Cinematography: René Guissart
- Production company: Playgoers Pictures
- Distributed by: Pathé Exchange
- Release date: June 12, 1921
- Running time: 50 minutes
- Country: United States
- Language: Silent (English intertitles)

The Butterfly Girl is a 1921 American silent drama film directed by John Gorman and starring Marjorie Daw, Fritzi Brunette, and King Baggot.

== Cast ==
- Marjorie Daw as Edith Folsom
- Fritzi Brunette as Lorna Lear
- King Baggot as H.H. Van Horn
- Jean De Briac as John Blaine
- Ned Whitney Warren as Ned Lorimer
- Lisle Darnell as Mary Van Horn

== Bibliography ==
- Donald W. McCaffrey and Christopher P. Jacobs. Guide to the Silent Years of American Cinema. Greenwood Publishing, 1999. ISBN 0-313-30345-2
