= Westcott Clarke =

American actor (1896–1959)

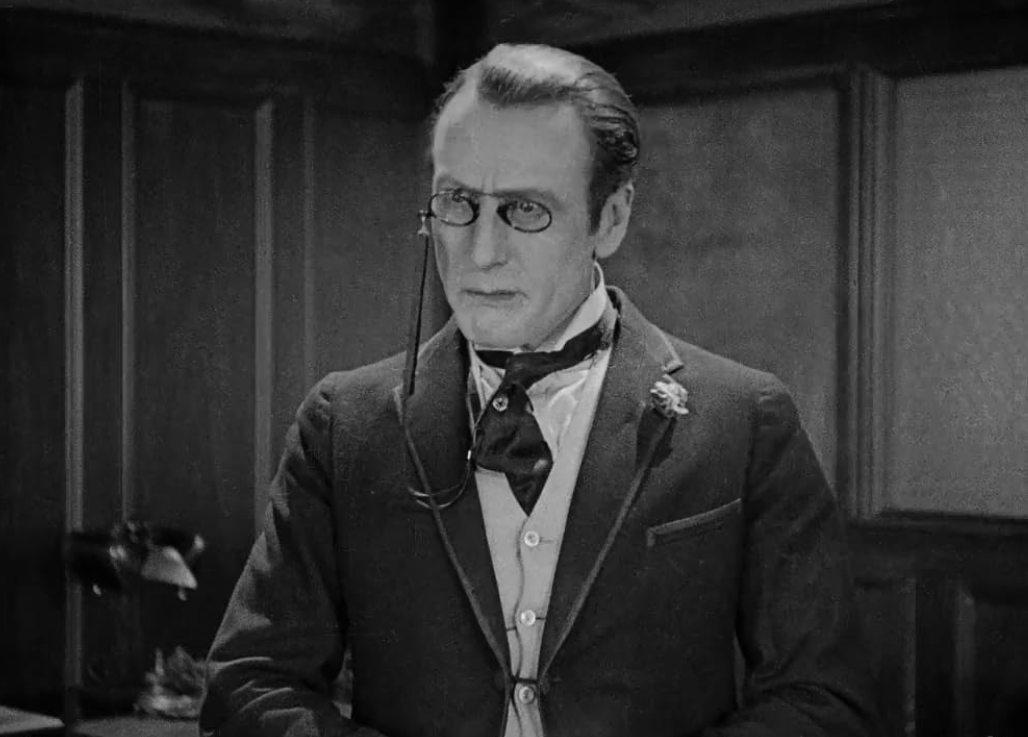
- Clarke in Safety Last! (1923)
- Born: Westcott Bailey Clarke; September 27, 1886; Jersey City, New Jersey, U.S.
- Died: January 26, 1959 (aged 72); Los Angeles, California
- Resting place: Fort Rosecrans National Cemetery, San Diego, California
- Other names: W.B. Clarke, Westcott B. Clarke, W.B. Westcott
- Occupation: Actor
- Years active: 1922–1929

Westcott Bailey Clarke (September 27, 1886 – January 26, 1959), also known as Westcott Clarke, W.B. Clarke, Westcott B. Clarke and W.B. Westcott, was an American actor who worked in the theater and in film. Born in Jersey City, New Jersey, he grew up in nearby Bayonne where he began his acting career in a local repertory theatre company in the early 1900s. He toured North America in Brown of Harvard in 1908-1909, and then worked as an itinerant actor in a variety of theatre troupes in the 1910s, including George M. Cohan and Sam H. Harris's company. He starred in Captain Kidd Junior on Broadway in 1917-1918, and by 1920 was working in Los Angeles as a stage actor. He worked as silent film actor in Hollywood during the 1920s.

== Biography ==
The son of Mr. and Mrs. William Clarke, Clarke was born in Jersey City, New Jersey, on September 27, 1886. He grew up in Bayonne, New Jersey, and began his career performing in repertory theatre in his native town with the Bayonne Opera House Stock Company. He joined the Spooner Stock Company, and in the 1908-1909 season toured North America in Brown of Harvard. In 1909-1910 season he performed in a production of Owen Wister's The Virginian. He starred in a production of The Great Ruby staged in Jersey City in 1910.

By 1914 Clarke was a member of the Selwyn & Co. theatre troupe starring in American regional theater as Detective Sergeant Cassidy in Bayard Veiller's Within the Law. In 1915 he became a member of George M. Cohan and Sam H. Harris's theatre troupe with whom he toured as The Dead Man in Elmer Rice's On Trial; ultimately taking over the larger part of Trask. In February 1916 he married Helen L. Shaffer. The marriage ended in divorce in June 1919.

In June 1916 Clarke starred in the premiere of Rida Johnson Young's Buried Treasure (later renamed Captain Kidd Junior) at the Apollo Theatre in Atlantic City, New Jersey. He starred in this play on Broadway in 1916-1917 at the Cohan & Harris Theatre in the role of the Expressman. By 1920 he was working in Los Angeles at the Symphony Theatre as a live performer before the presentation of silent films. He worked as a silent film actor in the 1920s; appearing in 12 films during his career. He was best known for his role in Safety Last! from 1923.

In 1948 he was a criminal defendant in the "atomic gold" conspiracy trial, and convicted by a jury on conspiracy charges. He was sentenced to three months in prison.

== Death ==
Clarke died in Los Angeles, California, in 1959. He is interred in Fort Rosecrans National Cemetery in San Diego, California.

== Filmography ==
Year	Title	Role	Notes
1922	Saturday Night	Bill – The Plumber	Uncredited
1922	North of the Rio Grande	Clendenning (as W.B. Clarke)	Lost film
1923	Safety Last!	The Floorwalker (as Westcott B. Clarke)	
1923	Why Women Remarry	Dan Hannon's sister's first husband (as W.B. Clarke)	
1924	At First Sight	L.R. Grandy	Short film
1924	The Dramatic Life of Abraham Lincoln	Thomas Lincoln (as Westcott B. Clarke)	
1924	Shadows of Paris	Laroque	Uncredited
1924	The Breaking Point	Sheriff Wilkins (as W.B. Westcott)	
1924	Sweet Daddy	Unknown role (as Westcott B. Clarke)	
1927	Finnegan's Ball	Lawyer O'Connell (as Westcott B. Clarke)	
1929	The Trial of Mary Dugan	Captain Price	
1929	Father and Son	Police Inspector	Uncredited, final film role
