= Home-Keeping Hearts =

1921 silent film

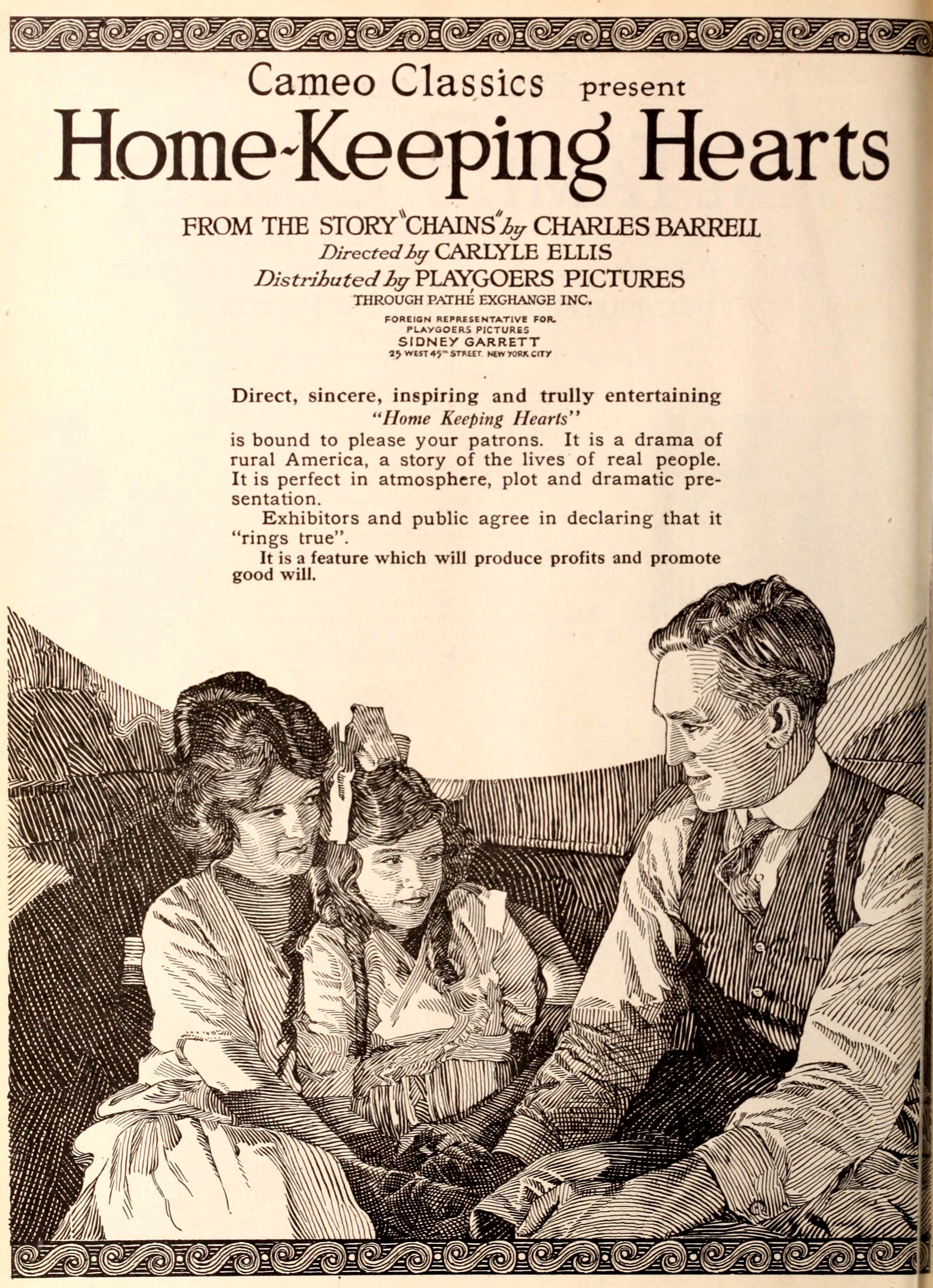
- Magazine advertisement
- Directed by: Carlyle Ellis
- Written by: Charles W. Barrell (story, screenplay)
- Produced by: Cameo Classics
- Starring: Thomas H. Swinton; Mary Ryan
- Cinematography: Walter Pritchard
- Distributed by: Playgoers Pictures
- Release date: September 11, 1921
- Running time: 5 reels
- Country: United States
- Languages: Silent; English intertitles

Home-Keeping Hearts is a lost 1921 silent film rural melodrama directed by Carlyle Ellis. It was produced by an independent production company and released as an independent feature by Playgoers Pictures.

== Cast ==
- Thomas H. Swinton - Robert Colton
- Mary Ryan - Mary Colton
- Louella Carr - Laurel Stewart
- Edward Grace - Squire Teal
- Henry West - Timothy Reece
