= The Breaking Point (1924 film) =

1924 film

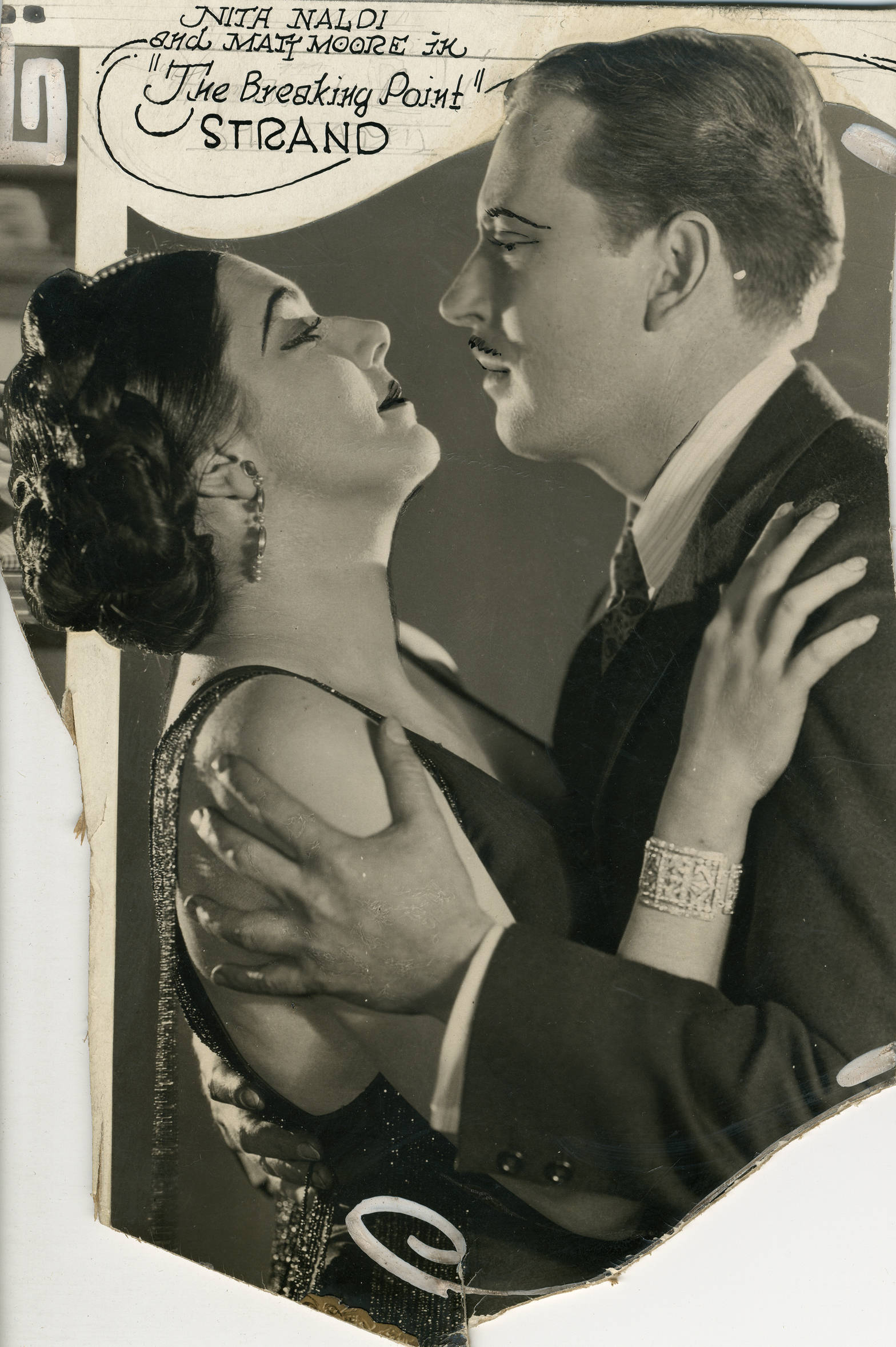
- Newspaper advertisement
- Directed by: Herbert Brenon
- Screenplay by: Edfrid A. Bingham; Julie Herne
- Based on: The Breaking Point; 1922 novel by Mary Roberts Rinehart
- Produced by: Jesse L. Lasky; Adolph Zukor
- Starring: Nita Naldi; Patsy Ruth Miller; George Fawcett; Matt Moore; John Merkyl; Theodore von Eltz; Edythe Chapman
- Cinematography: James Wong Howe
- Production company: Famous Players–Lasky Corporation
- Distributed by: Paramount Pictures
- Release date: May 4, 1924
- Running time: 70 minutes
- Country: United States
- Language: Silent (English intertitles)

The Breaking Point is a 1924 American silent mystery film directed by Herbert Brenon and written by Edfrid A. Bingham and Julie Herne. The film, based on the 1922 novel of the same name by Mary Roberts Rinehart, stars Nita Naldi, Patsy Ruth Miller, George Fawcett, Matt Moore, John Merkyl, Theodore von Eltz, and Edythe Chapman. The film was released on May 4, 1924, by Paramount Pictures.

== Plot ==
As described in a film magazine review, believing that he has killed the husband of Beverly Carlysle, an actress with whom he is infatuated, Judson Clark flees from the darkness of a ranch house in a western town into a snowstorm, is taken ill, and loses his memory. As Richard Livingstone, physician, he succeeds in New York City and becomes engaged to Elizabeth Wheeler. Ten years later while at a theater show, he is recognized from the stage by Beverly, who had thought her husband's killer had perished in the snow. He is taken to face justice back in Wyoming. There the real culprit confesses to the killing of Beverly's spouse. Judson finds happiness with Elizabeth.

== Cast ==
- Nita Naldi as Beverly Carlysle
- Patsy Ruth Miller as Elizabeth Wheeler
- George Fawcett as Dr. David Livingstone
- Matt Moore as Judson Clark
- John Merkyl as William Lucas
- Theodore von Eltz as Fred Gregory
- Edythe Chapman as Lucy Livingstone
- Cyril Ring as Louis Bassett
- Westcott Clarke as Sheriff Wilkins
- Edward Kipling as Joe
- Milton Brown as Donaldson (credited as Milt Brown)
- Charles A. Stevenson as Harrison Wheeler
- Naida Faro as Minnie
- Julia Faye as Gossipy Patient (uncredited)
- Willie Fung as Chinese Cook (uncredited)
- Rolfe Sedan as Theatre Audience Spectator (uncredited)

== Preservation ==
A complete copy of The Breaking Point is preserved in the Library of Congress collection.
