= The Man Who Won (1923 film) =

American silent Western film

- Directed by: William Wellman
- Written by: Ewart Adamson
- Based on: Twins of Suffering Creek (novel) by Ridgwell Cullum (1912)
- Produced by: William Fox
- Starring: Dustin Farnum
- Cinematography: Joseph H. August
- Distributed by: Fox Film Corporation
- Release date: August 26, 1923
- Running time: 50 minutes
- Country: United States
- Language: Silent (with English intertitles)

The Man Who Won is a 1923 American silent Western film directed by William A. Wellman. It was produced and distributed by the Fox Film Corporation.

== Cast ==
- Dustin Farnum - Wild Bill
- Jacqueline Gadsden - Jessie
- Lloyd Whitlock - "Lord" James
- Ralph Cloninger - Scipio, aka "Zip"
- Mary Warren - Birdie
- Pee Wee Holmes - Toby Jenks
- Harvey Clark - Sunny Oaks
- Lon Poff - Sandy Joyce
- Andy Waldron - Minkie
- Ken Maynard - Conroy
- Muriel McCormac -
- Mickey McBan - the Twins
- Bob Marks - The Drunkard

== Preservation ==
With no prints of The Man Who Won located in any film archives, it is considered a lost film.

== See also ==
- 1937 Fox vault fire
- List of Fox Film films
