= Vola Vale =

American actress (1897–1970)

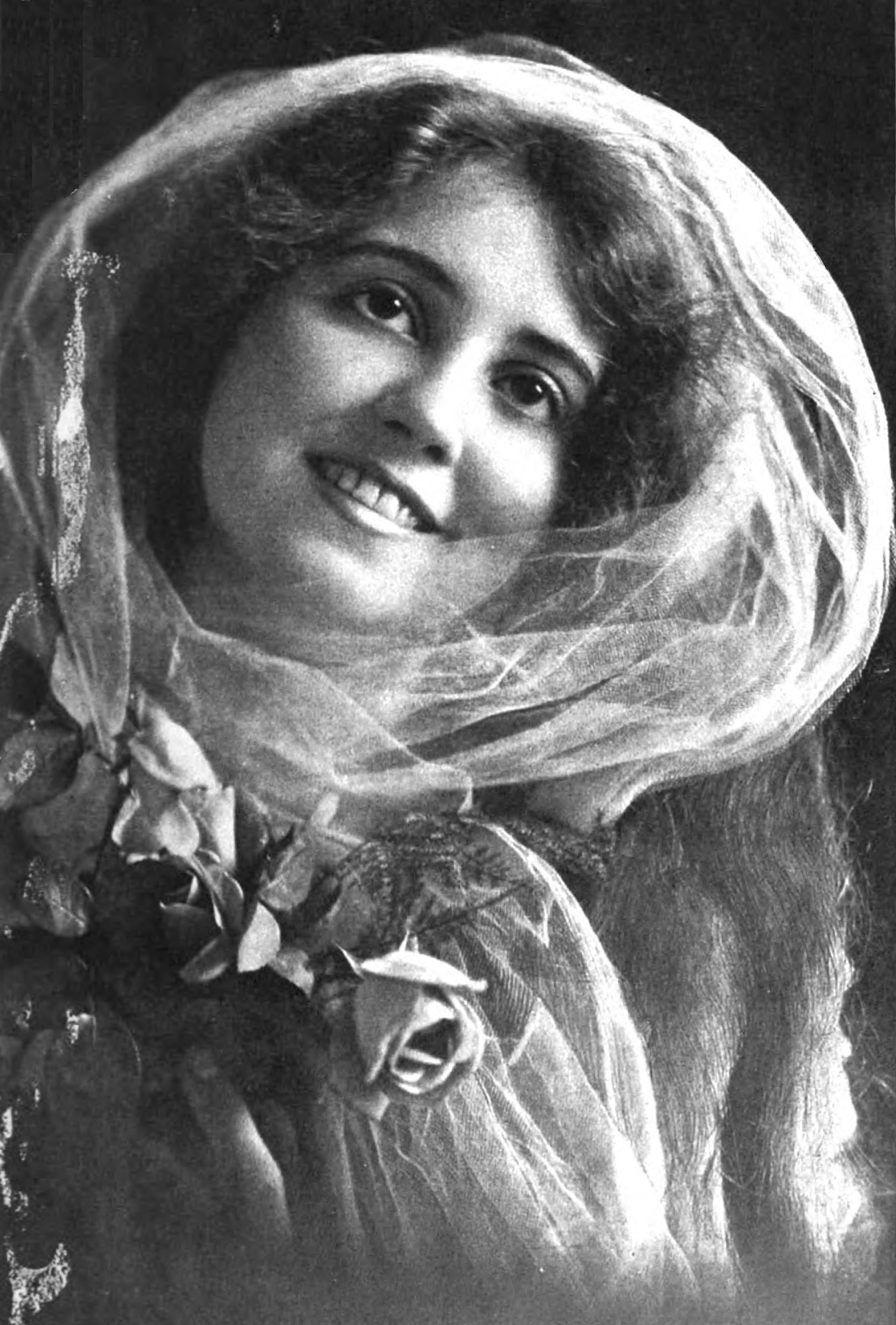
- Publicity photo from Motion Picture Magazine (August, 1915)
- Born: Vola Smith; February 12, 1897; Buffalo, New York, U.S.
- Died: October 17, 1970 (aged 73); Hawthorne, California, U.S.
- Occupation: Actress
- Spouses: Albert Russell (m. 1918; div. 1926) John. W. Gorman (m. 1926) Lawrence McDougal (m. 1932; died 1970)
- Children: 1

Vola Vale (born Vola Smith; February 12, 1897 – October 17, 1970) was a silent film actress. She was active in the film industry from 1916 through 1936.

== Early career ==
Vale was born in Buffalo, New York and educated in Chevy Chase, Maryland. Her high school friends in Rochester, New York, where she was raised, knew her as Vola Smith. She began her career in amateur theatricals in Rochester. Then she played in stock companies for a while.

After working under Bert Lytell on stage, in 1916 Vale began working in film for Biograph, under the tutelage of the film director D.W. Griffith. After a month of playing atmosphere parts, Vola was offered a genuine role. She wore a velvet gown with a train and a feathered hat. Soon she was appearing in short reel films for Biograph. Among the actors she was cast with were William S. Hart, Sessue Hayakawa, Tsuru Aoki, William Haines, Harry Carey, Tully Marshall and William Russell.

She was adept in playing Spanish, Italian, French, and Gypsy roles. Aside from Biograph, Vale worked for Fox Film, Famous Players–Lasky, Universal Pictures, and Paramount Pictures.

== Acting Career ==
Her ambition was to play Madame Butterfly with an actual Japanese company, as well as to act as Lorna Doone. She was most inspired by Hayakawa and hoped to learn to act inside, as he did. With Sessue Hayakawa, she made Each To His Kind (1917). Before filming began it was decided that the name Smith was too common to be used by a motion picture star. She changed her professional name to Vola Vale.

Vale reflected in the early 1920s about observation, particularly its power in attaining one's acting proficiency. It is the ability of the actress to see and note of the little things in life and then store them in her subconscious mind where they await her call to use at the psychological moment before the camera that enables her to either register success in her chosen work, or be merely mediocre. She began this process as a youth acting with D.W. Griffith. She observed how the director took notice of everything the actors did.

== Model ==
Vale modeled clothes for the Broadway Department Store in Los Angeles, California. A 1916 photo from the Los Angeles Times shows her in an exclusive Betty Wales frock from Broadway. This was a very popular dress among college women of the era.

== Private life ==
In the summer of 1917, Vale began living in an Ocean Bluff home in the city of Long Beach. Vale was married to film director and producer Al Russell. They had a son. On December 8, 1926, Vale married director John. W. Gorman in Santa Ana, California. They kept the wedding secret until they told friends on February 2, 1927. She married a third time to Lawrence McDougal, with whom she remained until his death in February 1970.

She was a member of Our Club, a group of seventeen of Hollywood's baby cinema stars. Mary Pickford served as honorary president. Fellow members were Mildred Davis, Helen Ferguson, Patsy Ruth Miller, Clara Horton, Gertrude Olmstead, Laura La Plante, Virginia Fox, Colleen Moore, ZaSu Pitts, Lois Wilson, May McAvoy, Gloria Hope, Virginia Valli, Carmel Myers, Edna Murphy, and Carmelita Geraghty.

Vale died in Hawthorne, California in 1970, aged 73, of heart disease. She is interred at Roosevelt Memorial Park in Los Angeles County, California.

== Filmography ==
Year	Title	Role	Notes
1916	Timothy Dobbs, That's Me	Mary Clarkson	Lost film
1916	The Eagle's Wings	Kitty Miles	Lost film
1916	The Price of Silence	Aline Urmy	
1917	Each to His Kind	Amy Dawe	Lost film
1917	The Winning of Sally Temple	Lady Pamela Vauclain	
1917	Mentioned in Confidence	Marjorie Manning	
1917	Perils of the Secret Service	Minna Ober	(Episode #1)
1917	The Bond Between	Ellen Ingram	Lost film
1917	The Secret of Black Mountain	Miriam Vale	Short; Incomplete film
1917	The Son of His Father	Hazel Mallinsbee	
1917	The Lady in the Library	Mildred Vandeburg	
1917	Zollenstein	Princess Fulvia / Princess Zenia	
1917	The Silent Man	Betty Bryce	
1918	Wolves of the Rail	Faith Lawson	
1918	The Locked Heart	Ruth Mason	Lost film
1919	Happy Though Married	Diana Ramon	Lost film
1919	A Heart in Pawn	Emily Stone	Lost film
1919	Hearts Asleep	Virginia Calvert	Lost film
1919	Hornet's Nest	Muriel Fletcher	Lost film
1919	Six Feet Four	Winifred Waverly	
1919	Someone Must Pay	Molly Brent	Lost film
1920	Overland Red	Louise Alacarme	Lost film
1920	Alias Jimmy Valentine	Rose Lane	Lost film
1920	A Master Stroke	Minnie Patton	Lost film
1920	The Purple Cipher	Jeanne Baldwin	Lost film
1920	Someone in the House	Molly Brent	Lost film
1920	The Iron Rider	Mera Donovan	Lost film
1920	Common Sense	Violet Manners	Lost film
1921	Singing River	Alice Thornton	Lost film
1921	The Duke of Chimney Butte	Vesta Philbrook	Lost film
1921	White Oak	Barbara	
1922	Good Men and True	Georgie Hibbler	Lost film
1923	Crashin' Thru	Diane	Lost film
1923	Soul of the Beast	Jacqueline	
1923	The Man Between	Rosie (Joe Cateau's bride)	Lost film
1923	Mothers-in-Law	Ina Phillips	Lost film
1923	The Midnight Flower	Myra	Lost film
1924	The Mirage	Betty Bond	Lost film
1925	Who Cares	Tootles	
1925	The Phantom of the Opera	Ballerina / Christines Maid	Uncredited
1925	Little Annie Rooney	Mamie	
1925	Heartless Husbands	Mrs. Jackson Cain	Lost film
1926	Her Big Adventure	Countess Fontaine	Lost film
1926	Two Can Play	Mimi	Lost film
1926	The Sky Pirate		Lost film
1926	Home Sweet Home		
1927	Black Tears		Lost film
1932	Tomorrow and Tomorrow	Townswoman	Uncredited
1936	One Rainy Afternoon	Minor Role	Uncredited

== Gallery ==
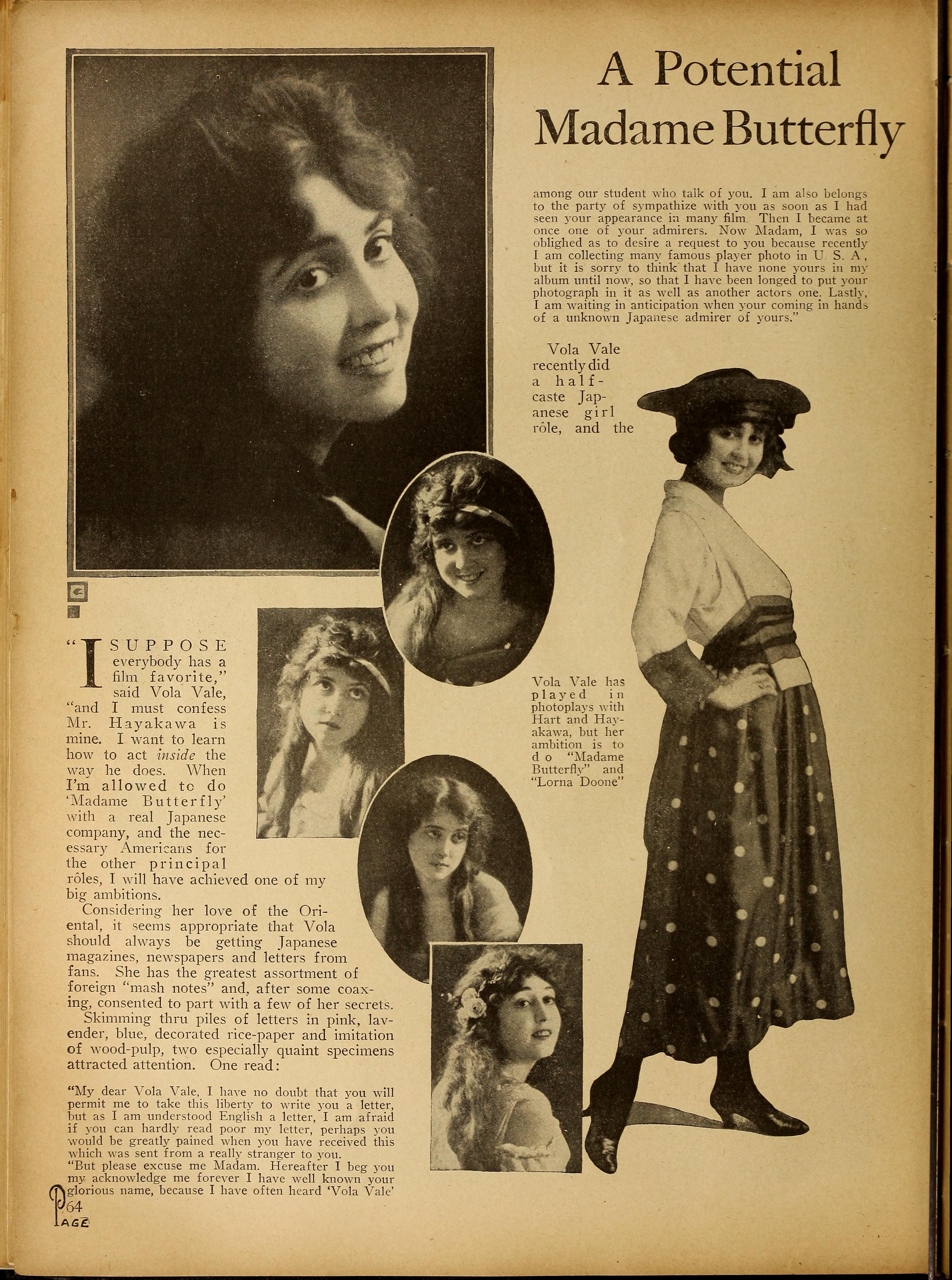
Magazine article regarding Vale

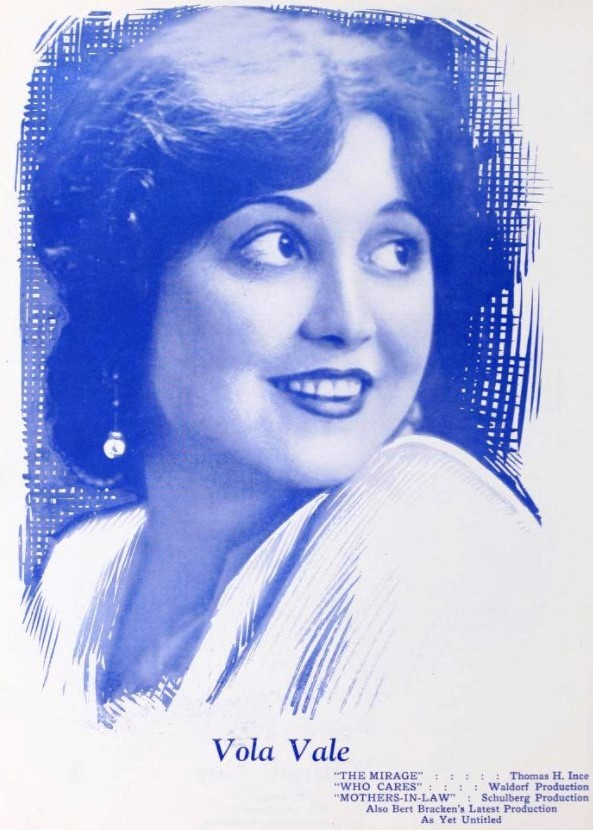
Vale in 1925

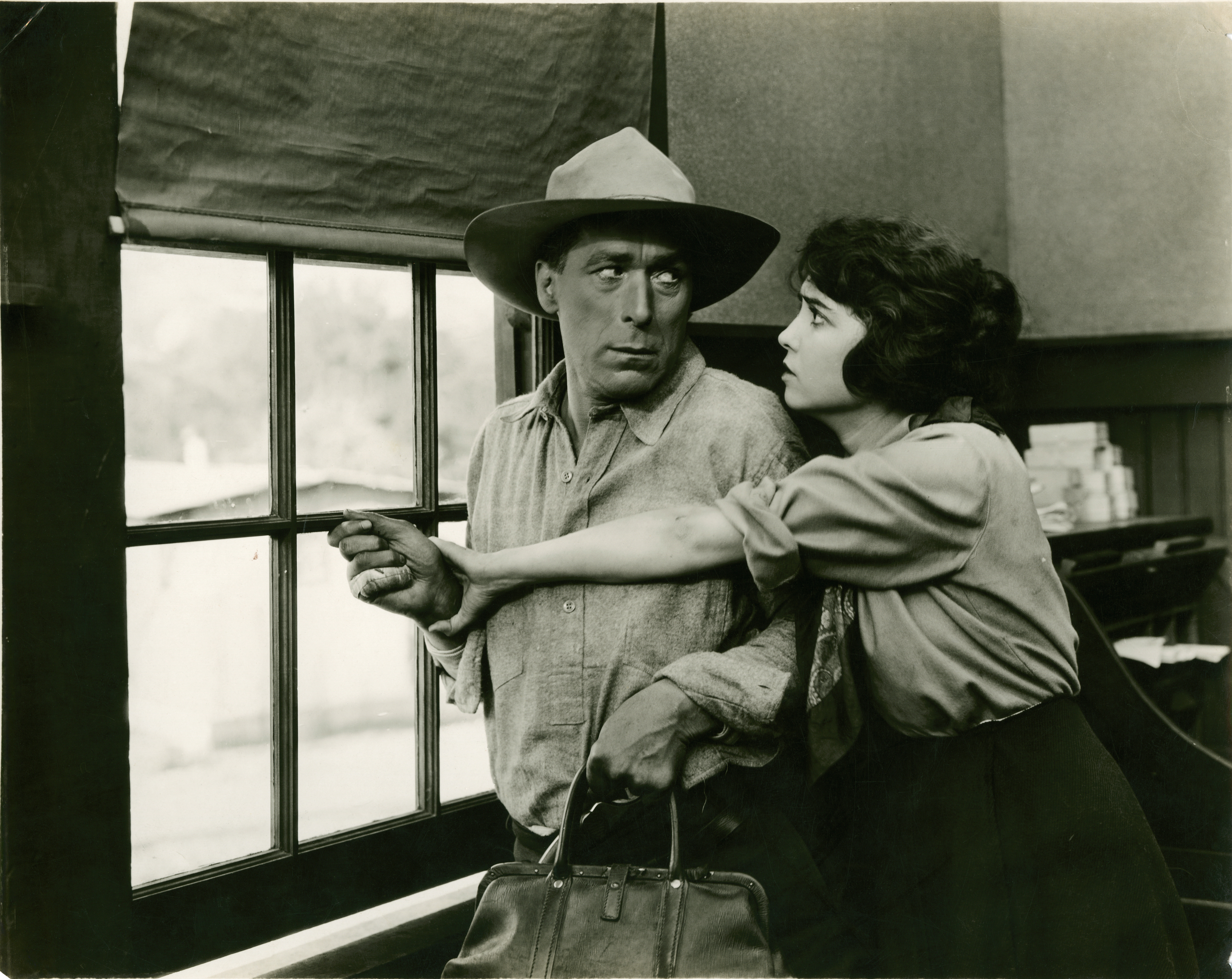
Vale and co-star William S. Hart for Wolves of the Rail

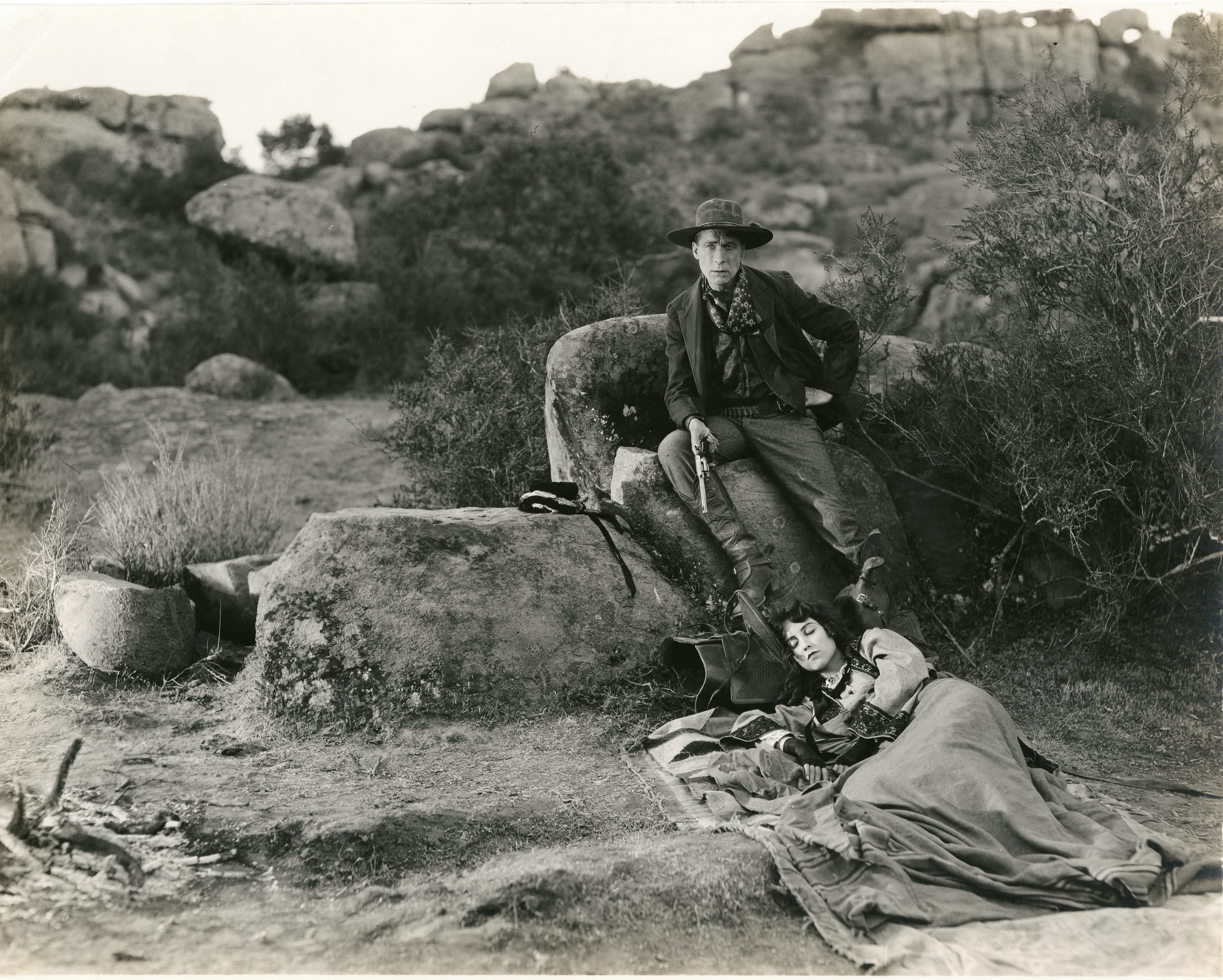
Vale and co-star William S. Hart for The Silent Man

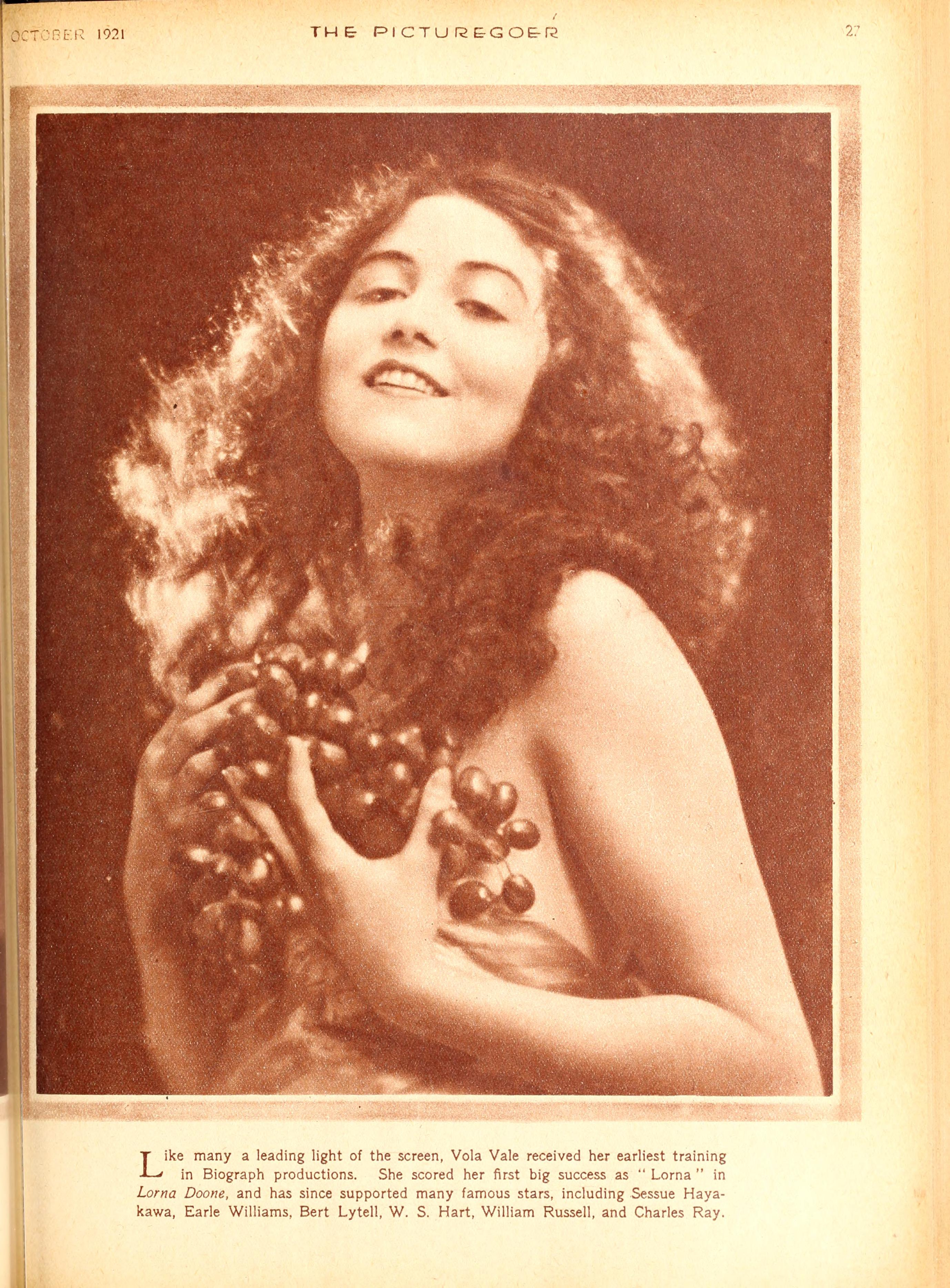
Vola Vale in Picturegoer Magazine

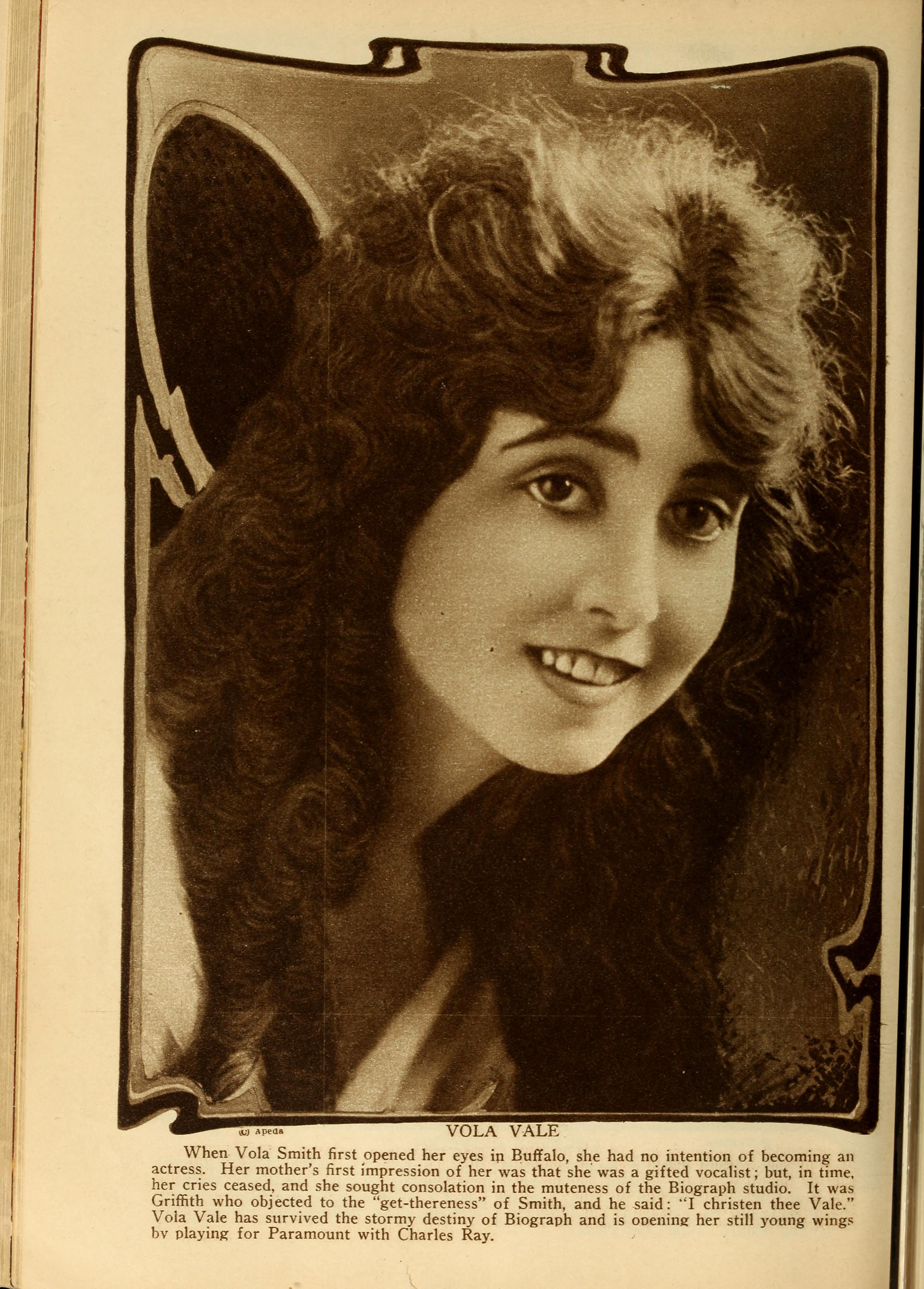
Vola Vale in Motion Picture Magazine

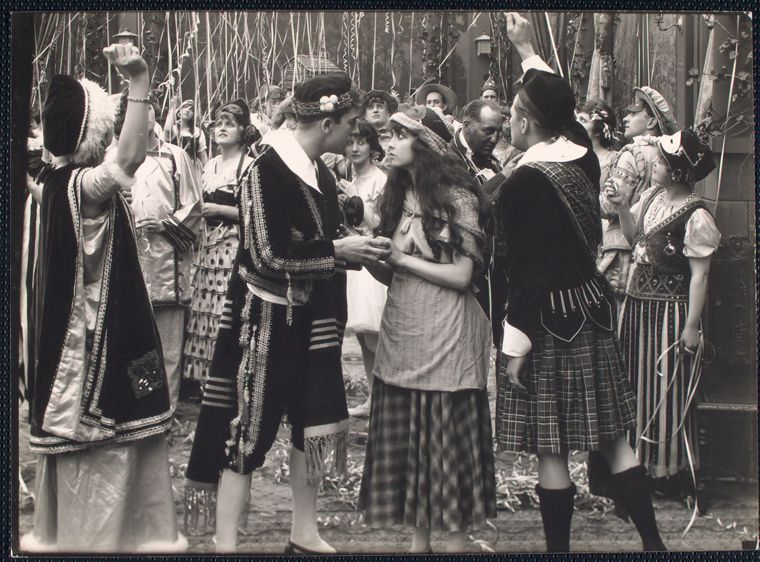
Jack Mulhall and Vola Vale in the motion picture Alias Jimmie Barton
