= The Desert Bride (1928 film) =

1928 film

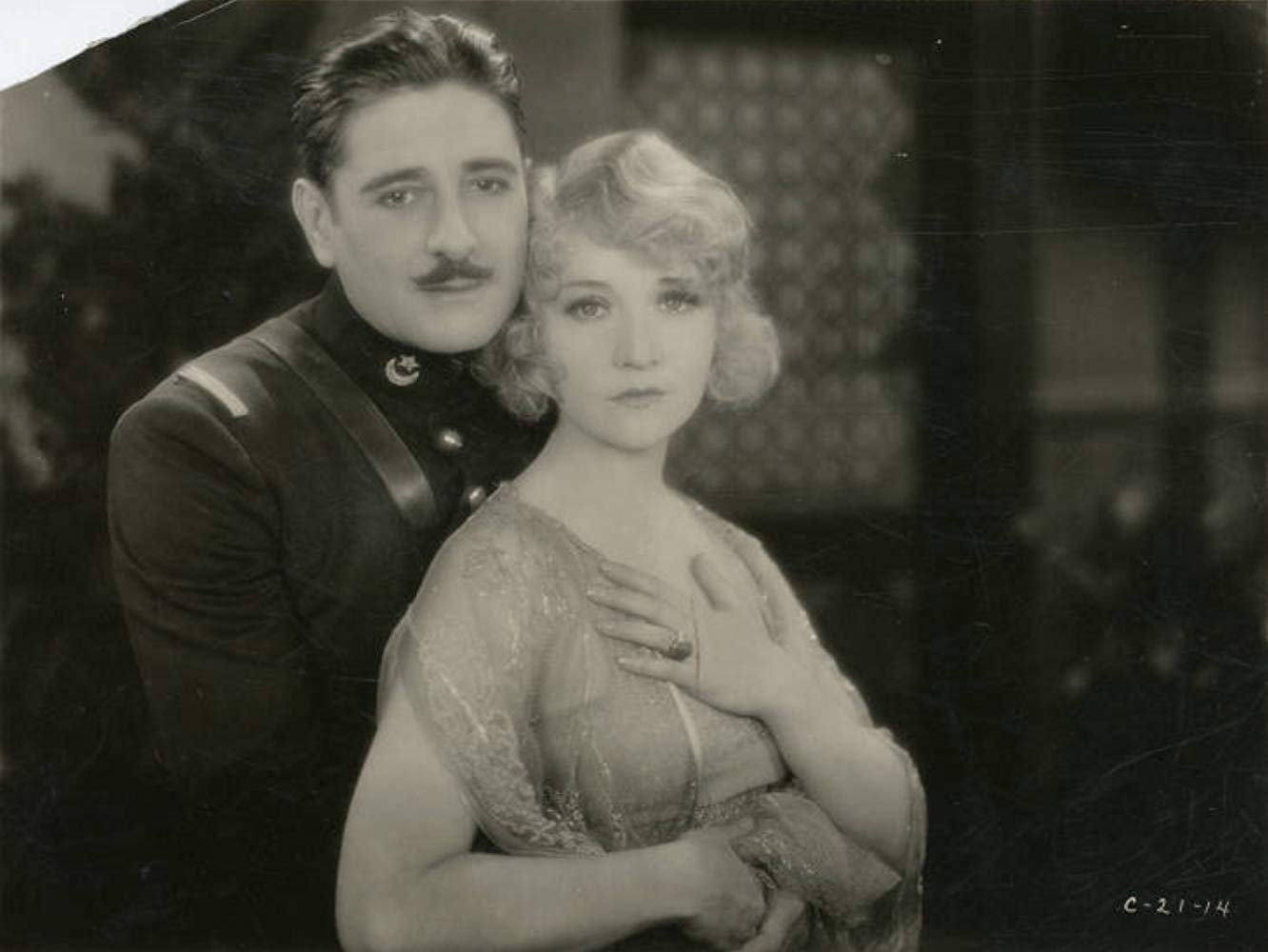
- Directed by: Walter Lang
- Written by: Ewart Adamson
- Produced by: Harry Cohn
- Starring: Betty Compson; Allan Forrest
- Cinematography: Ray June
- Edited by: Arthur Roberts
- Production company: Columbia Pictures
- Distributed by: Columbia Pictures
- Release date: March 26, 1928
- Running time: 56 minutes
- Country: United States
- Languages: Silent; English intertitles

The Desert Bride is a 1928 American silent drama film directed by Walter Lang and starring Betty Compson and Allan Forrest. It was adapted for the screen by Elmer Harris and Anthony Coldeway based on a short story titled "The Adventuress" by Ewart Adamson. Until 2017, the film was considered to be lost.

== Plot ==
The Desert Bride (1928)

In North Africa a French intelligence officer and his fiancée are taken prisoner by Arab Nationalists, whose leader tortures them before they are rescued by French troops.

== Cast ==
- Betty Compson as Diane Duval
- Allan Forrest as Capt. Maurice de Florimont
- Edward Martindel as Col. Sorelle
- Otto Matieson as Kassim Ben Ali
- Roscoe Karns as Pvt. Terry
- Frank Austin as Beggar

== Preservation ==
A complete 35mm nitrate print of The Desert Bride is held by a private collector.

The film was released as part of Columbia Classics Volume 5 on Ultra HD Blu-ray/Blu-ray Disc on October 22, 2024, by Sony Pictures Home Entertainment as a bonus film.

== Bibliography ==
- Parish, James & Robert & Pitts, Michael R. The Great Spy Pictures. Scarecrow Press, 1974.
