= Black Tears (1927 film) =

1927 film

- Directed by: John Gorman
- Written by: Van A. James(story); John Gorman(scenario)
- Produced by: John Gorman
- Starring: Bryant Washburn; Vola Vale
- Cinematography: Ernest Depew
- Distributed by: Hollywood Pictures
- Release date: June 8, 1927
- Running time: 6 reels; 5,700 feet (1,700 m)

Black Tears is a lost 1927 silent film society drama directed by John Gorman and starring Bryant Washburn. An independent production from director Gorman released through B movie Hollywood Pictures.

== Cast ==
- Bryant Washburn
- Vola Vale
- Jack Richardson
- Hedda Hopper
- Melbourne MacDowell
