= North of the Rio Grande (1922 film) =

1922 film

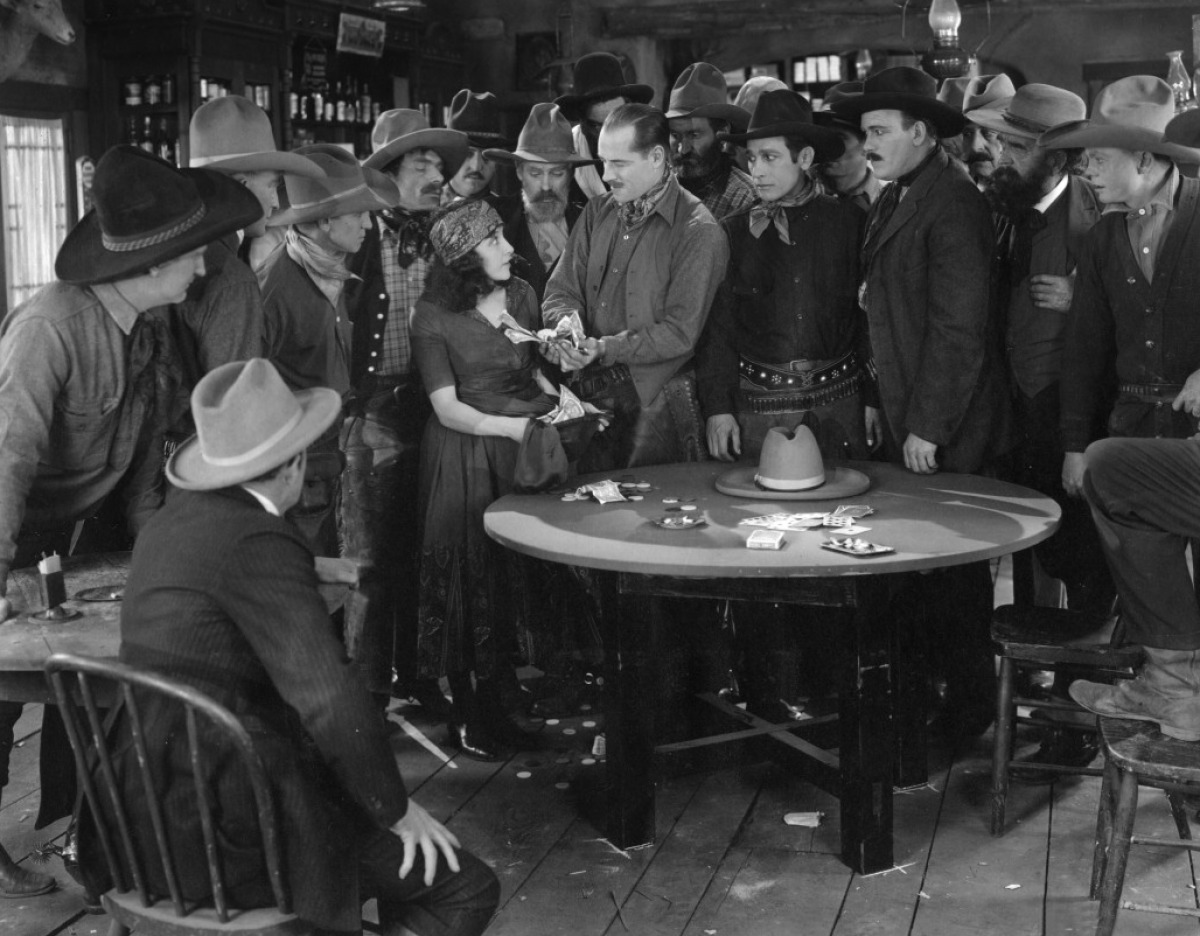
- Still with Shannon Day and Jack Holt (center)
- Directed by: Rollin S. Sturgeon; Joseph Henabery
- Written by: Will M. Ritchie
- Based on: Val of Paradise by Vingie E. Roe
- Produced by: Adolph Zukor; Jesse Lasky
- Starring: Bebe Daniels; Jack Holt
- Cinematography: Faxon M. Dean
- Distributed by: Paramount Pictures
- Release date: May 14, 1922
- Running time: 5 reels
- Country: United States
- Languages: Silent; English intertitles

North of the Rio Grande is a lost 1922 American silent film, a Western directed by Rollin S. Sturgeon and starring Bebe Daniels and Jack Holt.

== Cast ==
- Jack Holt as Bob Haddington
- Bebe Daniels as Val Hannon
- Charles Ogle as Colonel Haddington
- Alec B. Francis as Father Hillaire
- Will Walling as John Hannon
- Jack Carlyle as Brideman
- Fred Huntley as Briston
- Shannon Day as Lola Sanchez
- Edythe Chapman - Belle Hannon
- George Field as Paul Perez
- Westcott Clarke as Clendenning
