= The West of the Imagination =

American documentary series

- Created by: William H. Goetzmann
- Written by: Tom Weidlinger and William H. Goetzmann (1-4); David Kennard and William H. Goetzmann (5); Jannelle Balnicke, David Kennard, and William H. Goetzmann (6_
- Directed by: Tom Weidlinger (1-4); David Kennard (5); Janelle Balnicke (6)
- Narrated by: James Whitmore
- Music by: Stephen Montague
- Country of origin: United States
- Original language: English

Production
- Executive producer: David Kennard
- Cinematography: Hilyard J. Brown, Robert Cozens, Erik Daarstad, and Michael Andersen
- Production company: KERA-TV

Original release
- Network: PBS
- Release: September 22 – October 27, 1986

The West of the Imagination is a six-part documentary series that aired weekly on PBS from September 22, 1986 to October 27, 1986. The series captured the story of the American "Wild West" as it was told through art, film, photography, music, and entertainers within broader pop culture. Created by Dr. William H. Goetzman and hosted by James Whitmore, The West of the Imagination was produced for PBS by KERA-TV, in association with the Independent Communications Association of Los Angeles and London. Alongside the series, W.W. Norton published a companion book, written by creator William H. Goetzmann.

== Series synopsis and episode summaries ==
As writer Robert Barr stated in his interview of The West of the Imagination, "the West isn’t simply a spot on the globe, but a place in the mind, a land that has inflamed the imaginations of Americans and of the world." This idea of the Wild West as not only a location and time period but also as a cultural phenomenon is the central focus of exploration in The West of the Imagination. This documentary series fuses a factual account of the real-world history, including segments of historical reenactment, with an exhibition of the different forms of art and media that have stemmed from the events as a result of its cultural influence. Through this deconstruction, The West of the Imagination immortalizes the folklore and myth surrounding the Wild West and its events, capturing the cultural mindset as it has existed and evolved through time.

Episode 1, "The Romantic Horizon," focuses on the Expedition of Lewis and Clarke as seen through the artwork of George Catlin, Karl Bodmer, and Alfred Jacob Miller.

Episode 2, "The Golden Land," covers the saga of Manifest Destiny and how it influenced the Texas Revolution, the Mexican War, and the gold rush that popularized the journey on the Oregon Trail, as seen through the artwork of George Caleb Bingham, Albert Bierstadt, and Charles Nahl, and the lithographers Currier and Ives.

Episode 3, "Images of Glory," shows how the artwork of Thomas Moran and Albert Bierstadt and the photography of Eadweard Muybridge, William H. Jackson, and Timothy O'Sullivan captured the American Indian Wars and the Transcontinental Railroad, signifying the beginning of the end of the Wild West as it had previously existed.

Episode 4, "The Wild Riders," analyzes the American Cowboy as a figure, primarily focusing on the two contrasting views of the figure in the art of Frederic Remington and Charles Marion Russell.

Episode 5, "Play the Legend," covers the Wild West as it is seen in modern popular culture, from the Buffalo Bill's Wild West Show to influences within country musicians and entertainers such as Billy Joe Shaver and Willie Nelson.

Episode 6, "Enduring Dream," concludes the series with a holistic view of the American Wild West and how its depictions change between the artists who depict it. The episode contrasts the works of white, American artists such as Thomas Hart Benton and Grant Wood with the art of Native American artists Fritz Scholder and T.C. Cannon, the Taos artists' movement, and more, breaking down their differences and similarities and comparing them to the views held today.

== Cast list ==
Episode 1: "The Romantic Horizon" (Monday, September 22, 1986 – 9pm ET)
Role	Portrayed by
George Catlin	Michael O’Guinne
Charles Willson Peale	Douglas Wing
A.J. Miller	Jimmy Higgins

Episode 2: "The Golden Land" (Monday, September 29, 1986 – 9pm ET)
Role	Portrayed by
William Gilpin	Michael Shepherd
Lotta Crabtree	Laura Jean Pacheco
Fiddler	"Cactus Bob" Cole

Episode 3: "Images of Glory" (Monday, October 6, 1986 – 9pm ET)
Role	Portrayed by
Thomas Hart Benton	Jim Antonio
Sitting Bull	Will Sampson
William T. Sherman	David Fox-Brenton
Nathaniel Langford	John Clarke
Fitz Hugh Ludlow	Phillip English
Albert Bierstadt	Newell Tarrant
New York Herald Correspondent	Ron Kuhlman
Barker	J. Eddy Eslin

Episode 4: "The Wild Riders" (Monday, October 13, 1986 – 9pm ET)
Role	Portrayed by
Frederic Remington	Jerome Dempsey
Charlie Russell	Richard Young
Professor Niemeyer	Max Brandt
Art Professor	Richard R.J. Thomsen
Rawhide Rawlins	Matt Emery
Young Remington	Matt Salinger

Episode 5: "Play the Legend" (Monday, October 20, 1986 – 9pm ET)
Role	Portrayed by
Ned Buntline	Rex McGraw
Buffalo Bill	Michael Freemole

Episode 6: "Enduring Dream" (Monday, October 27, 1986 – 9pm ET)
Role	Portrayed by
Eanger Irving Couse	Jeremy Lepard
Mabel Dodge	Mary Gates

== Critical reception ==
The West of Our Imagination was a critical and commercial success. Critics praised its "blending of early artistic visions of the American West" with "up-to-date cinematography of its natural splendors," and it was called "an excellent, cleverly conceived, elegantly photographed series." It was also praised for helping to "distinguish between truth and the fiction depicted by the more romantic artists," and for "answering those questions" about the accuracy of "the mixture of romance and expectation" found within art.

Despite this praise, the series received some criticism for its glossing over of certain issues that perpetuate stereotypes. And, despite intending to remove the mythos from the Wild West, The West of Our Imagination raised comments from several reviewers about potentially "contributing to the myth[s] itself" with historical fiction being infused into the reenactment segments. It was also critiqued for wavering between being "too cute" and making it "too easy for viewers" during some of the reenactment segments, while also "tak[ing] itself too seriously at times" during the short discussion segments at each episodes’ end.
