= Blood and Sand =

Blood and Sand may refer to:

- Blood and Sand (novel) (Spanish: Sangre y arena), a 1908 novel by Vicente Blasco Ibáñez, which was the basis for one play and four films:
  - Blood and Sand (1916 film), directed by Ibáñez himself
  - Blood and Sand (1922 film), starring Rudolph Valentino, Lila Lee, and Nita Naldi (also based on Cushing's play)
  - Blood and Sand (1941 film), directed by Rouben Mamoulian starring Tyrone Power, Linda Darnell, and Rita Hayworth
  - Blood and Sand (1989 film), Spanish film starring Chris Rydell, Sharon Stone, and Ana Torrent
  - Blood and Sand (play), play by Tom Cushing
- Fort Graveyard, a 1965 Japanese war film also known as Chi to Suna (Blood and Sand).
- Spartacus: Blood and Sand, a 2010 television series
- Blood and Sand (cocktail), a Scotch-based cocktail

== See also ==
- Sand and Blood, a 1988 French film
