= La barraca =

La barraca may refer to:

- La barraca (novel), 1898 novel by the Spanish writer Vicente Blasco Ibáñez
- La barraca (film), 1945 film based on the novel
- La barraca (TV series), 1979 television series based on the novel
- La Barraca, a theatre company directed by author Federico García Lorca in the 1930s
