= Tom Cushing =

American playwright

Charles Cyprian Strong Cushing (October 27, 1879 – March 6, 1941) was an American playwright who wrote under the name Tom Cushing.

== Biography ==
Cushing was born in New Haven, Connecticut, the son of William Lee Cushing, founder and headmaster of the Westminster School in Simsbury, Connecticut, and Mary Lewis Strong Cushing. His aunt was mathematics professor Eleanor P. Cushing. He attended Westminster and later Yale University, where he was a member of Skull and Bones. He graduated in 1902. He was a tutor in the English Sudan in 1903 and a teacher of English and Greek at Westminster from 1909 to 1917. During World War II, he served in France in the entertainment division of the YMCA. Cushing died at Baker Memorial Hospital in Boston following an operation for a brain tumor.

== Professional career ==
He made his Broadway in 1912 debut authoring the musical comedy Sari, an English language adaptation of the operetta Der Zigeunerprimas. Cushing complained to P. G. Wodehouse that he was only paid $500 for the play.

In 1921, his play Thank You, co-written with Winchell Smith, debuted at the Longacre Theatre. Dorothy Parker wrote that it was "deftly done..and gently amusing. The small-town characters are not so obtrusively comic as they might be, and you can guess what a relief that is. If ever a play ended at the second act, Thank You is that very play, but there is, of course, a third act, so that the dress suits can be brought in, and the audience can feel that it has had its money's worth." 1925 John Ford directed a film version Thank You.

Another 1921 premiere, at the Empire Theatre, was Blood and Sand, his adaptation of the Vicente Blasco Ibáñez novel Blood and Sand (1908). Otis Skinner starred as the toreador Juan Gallardo, and while his performance was acclaimed, critics thought he was too old for the part. Cushing's play was its adapted into a 1922 silent film version starring Rudolph Valentino.

In 1923, his play Laugh, Clown, Laugh, co-written with David Belasco, debuted at the Belasco Theatre. It was adapted from the Italian play Ridi, Pagliaccio by Fausto Maria Martini. Lionel Barrymore starred as the depressed clown Tito Beppi. Lon Chaney played the role in a 1928 silent film adaptation.

Out O'Luck, a comedy about doughboys in France, was performed by the Yale Dramatic Association in 1925 and later went on tour. Yale alumni Cole Porter contributed three songs to the play and its success provided him with badly needed confidence at a time when he considered abandoning songwriting.

Cushing's 1926 play The Devil in the Cheese premiered at the Charles Hopkins Theatre. In it, an American couple, played by (Robert McWade and Catherine Calhoun Doucet) and their daughter (Linda Watkins) visit Meteora, where they are held for ransom by a Greek bandit posing as a priest and archaeologist (Bela Lugosi) and later rescued by the daughter's boyfriend (Fredric March). The second act takes place within the daughter's imagination, and includes adventurous travels in the South Seas and on a desert island, domestic life, and her becoming First Lady. After her father eats a piece of mummified cheese he is made privy to his daughter's daydreams thanks to the Egyptian god Min. The New York Times wrote of Lugosi's performance that he "acts with an authority and cadence worthy of better things".

La Gringa (1928) premiered at the Little Theatre, starring Claudette Colbert. It was adapted as the now lost film South Sea Rose (1929).

Barely Proper was a 1929 play that went unperformed on Broadway during his lifetime – Cushing subtitled it An Unplayable Play – but it was published. The play about a family of nudists was finally performed in 1970 at the Belasco by Ken McGuire to very poor reviews. Clive Barnes wrote in the New York Times that it was "making teensy-weensy headlines as being the first Broadway nudist play. It should probably be the last".
