= Nita Naldi =

American actress (1894–1961)

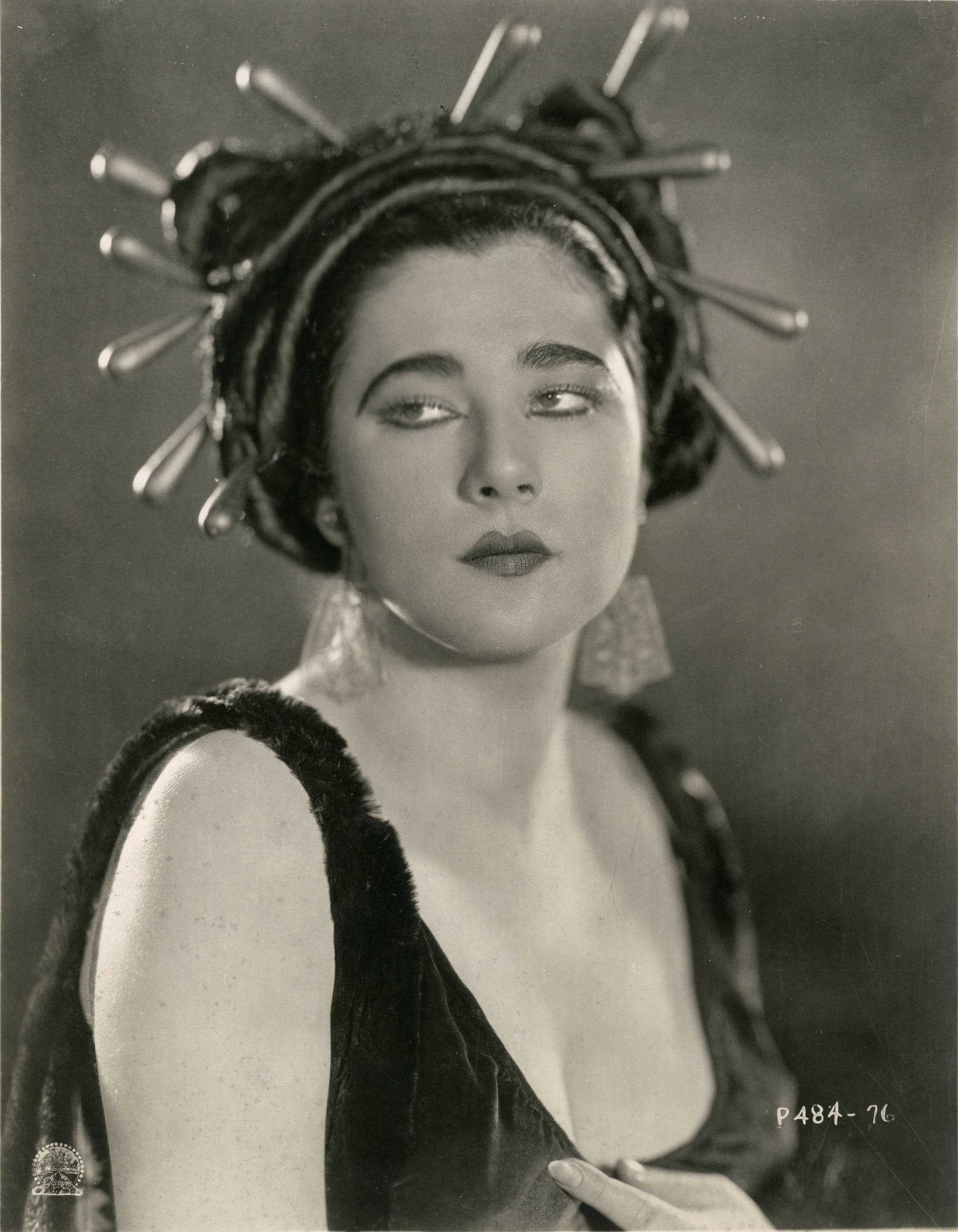
- Naldi, 1924
- Born: Mary Nonna Dooley; November 13, 1894; New York City, U.S.
- Died: February 17, 1961 (aged 66); New York City, U.S.
- Occupation: Actress
- Years active: 1915–1961
- Spouse: J. Searle Barclay (m. 1929; died 1945)

Nita Naldi (born Mary Nonna Dooley; November 13, 1894 – February 17, 1961) was an American stage performer and silent film actress. She was often cast in theatrical and screen productions as a vamp, a type of character first popularized by actress Theda Bara.

== Early life ==
Nita Naldi was born in a tenement in New York City to working class Irish parents, Julia (née Cronin) and Patrick Dooley, in 1894. Four of her siblings died in infancy, with only her younger brother, Daniel Aloysius, surviving to adulthood.

Known in her youth as Nonna, she was named in honor of her great-aunt, Mary Nonna Dunphy, a nun who in 1879 had founded Academy of the Holy Angels in Fort Lee, New Jersey. Later, in 1910, she attended the Catholic school, the same year her father “'left the family'”. The Academy was located directly across Linwood Avenue from Willat/Fox film studio.

Her mother's death in 1915 required Nonna to care for her two younger siblings. To support them and herself she took several jobs, including work as an artist's model and a cloak model. She soon entered vaudeville with her brother Frank, and by 1918, she was performing as a chorus girl at the Winter Garden Theatre in The Passing Show of 1918. Nonna Dooley changed her name to Nita Naldi, which she adapted from the name of a childhood friend Florence Rinaldi. Working under her new name, Naldi continued acting on Broadway, and after her well-received performance in The Bonehead, producer William A. Brady in 1920 offered her a role in his play Opportunity.

== Film career ==
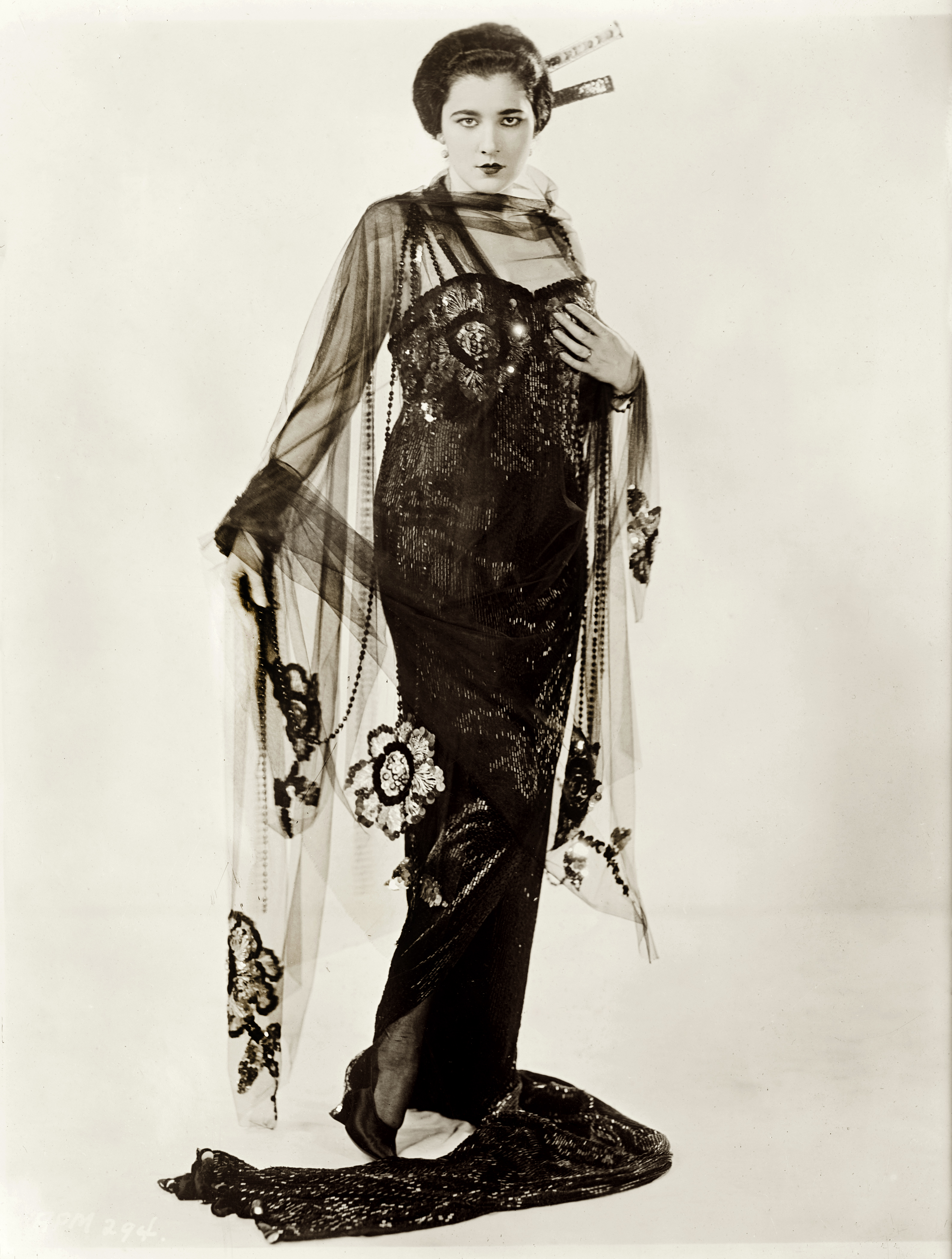
Naldi, 1921

Naldi was asked to perform in a short film with Johnny Dooley, a Scottish comedian who, despite his last name, was unrelated to her. She soon quit the film after realizing that Dooley had romantic intentions with another woman. Naldi was offered a role in A Divorce of Convenience with Owen Moore. Following these two films, she had small roles in several independent films and then was cast as the exotic character Gina in Paramount Pictures's 1920 release Dr. Jekyll and Mr. Hyde starring John Barrymore. Barrymore reportedly recommended her for the role after he “spotted” her dancing at the Winter Garden. Her noted performance in that film subsequently afforded Naldi more career opportunities.

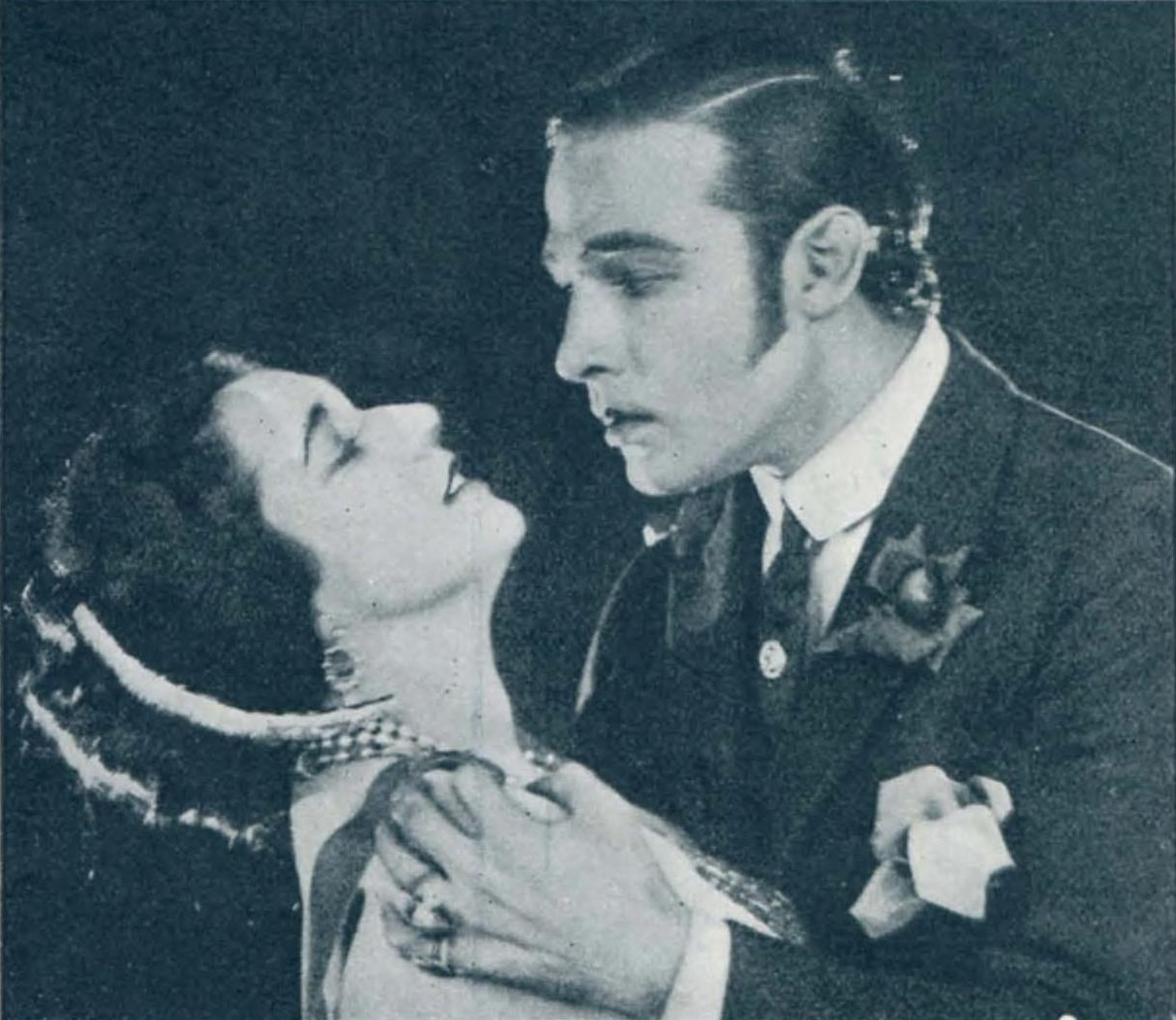
Naldi and Valentino in Blood and Sand, 1922

Naldi was selected by Spanish author Vicente Blasco Ibáñez for the role of Doña Sol in the 1922 film version of his novel Blood and Sand. Naldi was signed by Famous Players–Lasky for the role, and it became her first pairing with screen idol Rudolph Valentino. The film was a major success, giving Naldi the image of a vamp, which followed her for the rest of her life. Naldi and Valentino were never romantic, and she was one of the few to befriend his wife Natacha Rambova, but this friendship soured when the Valentinos divorced.

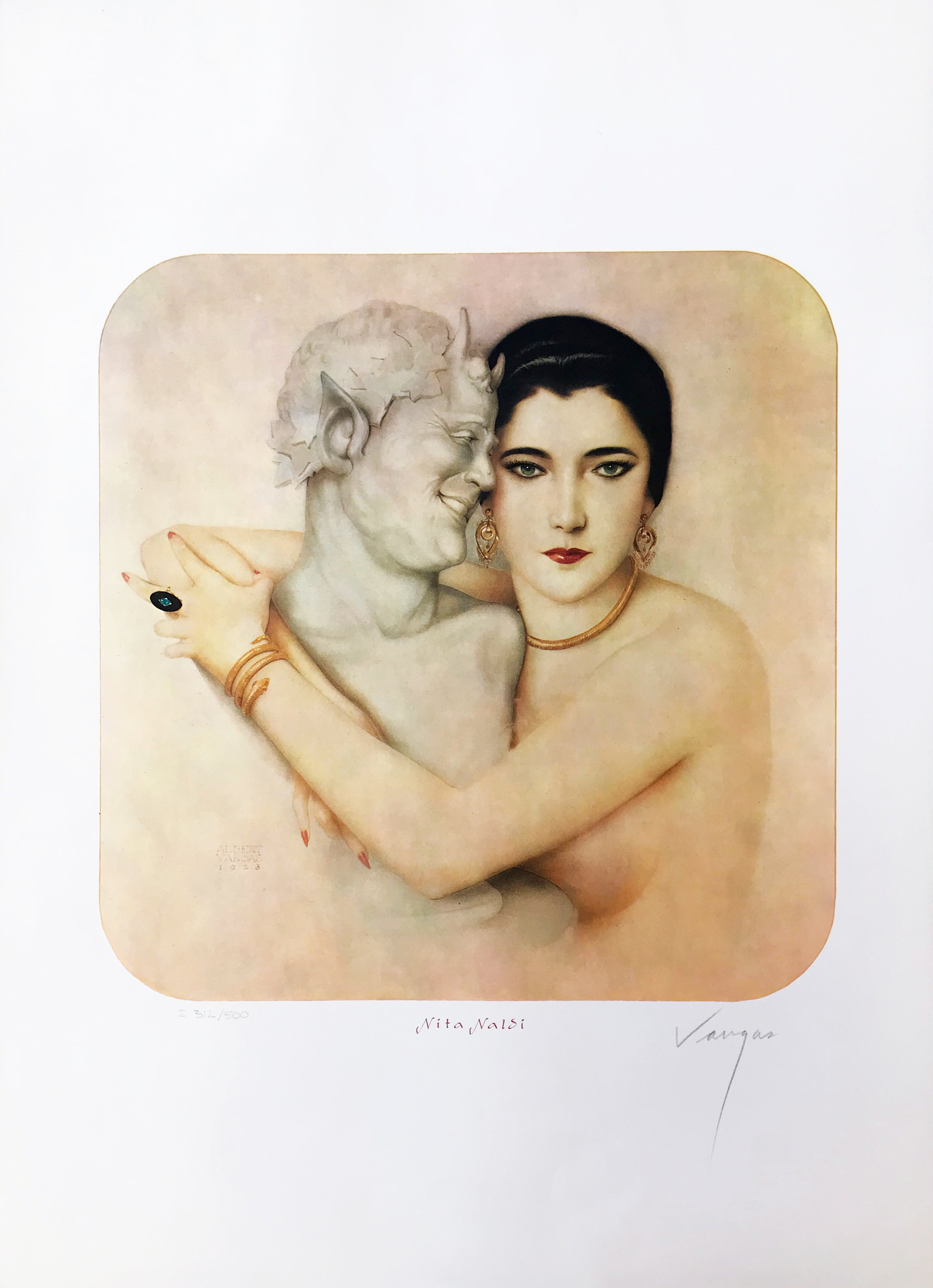
"Nita Naldi with a statue of a faun", by Alberto Vargas, 1923

During this time, Naldi posed for famous Peruvian artist Alberto Vargas, who painted her embracing a bust of a satyr. In Vargas's original “pin-up” painting, Naldi is depicted topless, but copies of the portrait that were published and widely distributed in the 1920s, such as in the art and entertainment magazine Shadowland, were “modified” by the addition of clothing to cover her partially visible left breast.

While Valentino went on his one-man strike, which prevented him from appearing on film, Naldi took on several Famous Players–Lasky roles with growing importance, including The Ten Commandments (1923), directed by Cecil B. DeMille. When Valentino returned and fixed his contract woes, she joined him for his final Famous Players–Lasky film, the now lost A Sainted Devil (1924). Naldi left the company soon after.

Naldi featured in the August 1924 issue of Photoplay, where she is described as “Sloe-eyed, and darkly beautiful”

In 1924, the Valentinos and Naldi traveled to France in order to do research for the film The Hooded Falcon. which was never made. Upon returning to California, the duo made Cobra. The film was not well received, and Cobra became the last film in which Naldi and Valentino starred together. The Valentinos' marriage was ending around this time. After Valentino signed a contract with United Artists, he banned Rambova from the set. She was given her own film as a consolation. Naldi starred in Rambova's 1925 production What Price Beauty? The film suffered distribution problems, it was barely noted at the time, but it is noteworthy for being actress Myrna Loy's first screen appearance.

After finishing the Dorothy Gish film Clothes Make the Pirate, Naldi left for France for a short vacation, where she married J. Searle Barclay. Despite multiple rumors that she had retired, Naldi began work on several films, including Alfred Hitchcock's The Mountain Eagle in 1926. She is often mistakenly credited for appearing in Hitchcock's The Pleasure Garden.

Naldi made two films in France and one in Italy, and then she retired. Despite having an acceptable voice, Naldi never made a sound film.

== Personal life ==
In 1929, seven years after the success of Blood and Sand, Naldi was named as a party in the divorce proceedings between 54-year-old millionaire J. Searle Barclay and his wife of 16 years. Barclay and Naldi had met during her stage career a decade earlier and had lived together with her sister in New York since 1920. The pair married in France in August 1929. Naldi, alone, returned to the United States two years later and then filed for bankruptcy in 1934. Naldi did not speak publicly about Barclay until after his death in 1945. He died penniless.

Despite Hollywood gossip and published rumors, Naldi denied ever being romantically involved with either Valentino or Barrymore. In 1956, she was rumored to be engaged to a Park Avenue man named Larry Hall, but no union took place. Naldi had no children.

== Later life ==
Due to the financial reversals caused by her retirement from films, as well as the Great Depression, Naldi filed for bankruptcy in 1932. She returned to the stage with Queer People and The Firebird in 1933. The press had been critical of her weight since 1924, and reviews of her appearances in both plays were especially harsh this time around — so harsh in fact that Naldi filed suit against one paper in 1934 for $500,000. The suit was dismissed in 1938.

In 1942, Naldi was considered for For Whom the Bell Tolls but did not receive the part. She never made another film. The same year, she began appearing in a revue in New York with Mae Murray, reciting the 1897 poem "A Fool There Was."

In 1952, she had a notable role in the play In Any Language, co-starring Uta Hagen. In 1955, she coached Carol Channing how to vamp, for Channing's musical The Vamp.

Also in the 1950s, Naldi appeared on the television series Omnibus.

== Death ==
Naldi spent her final years in New York City, where she died of a heart attack in her room at the Wentworth Hotel on West 46th Street on February 17, 1961. She was buried in the family plot at Calvary Cemetery in Queens, New York.

== Recognition ==
For her contribution to the film industry, Nita Naldi was honored with a star on the Hollywood Walk of Fame at 6316 Hollywood Boulevard.

== Filmography ==
Year	Title	Role	Notes
1920	Dr. Jekyll and Mr. Hyde	Miss Gina	
1920	The Common Sin	Warren's Mistress	Lost film
1920	Life	Grace Andrews	Lost film
1921	Everyman's Price		Lost film
1921	The Last Door	The Widow	Lost film
1921	A Divorce of Convenience	Tula Moliana	Lost film
1921	Experience	Temptation	Lost film
1922	The Man from Beyond	Marie Le Grande	
1922	Reported Missing	Nita	Lost film
1922	Channing of the Northwest	Cicily Varden	Lost film
1922	Blood and Sand	Doña Sol	
1922	The Snitching Hour	The 'Countess'	Lost film
1922	Anna Ascends	Countess Rostolff	Lost film a six-minute fragment survives
1922	For Your Daughter's Sake		Lost film
1923	The Glimpses of the Moon	Ursula Gillow	Lost film
1923	You Can't Fool Your Wife	Ardrita Saneck	Lost film
1923	Lawful Larceny	Vivian Hepburn	Lost film
1923	Hollywood	Herself	Lost film
1923	The Ten Commandments	Sally Lung, a Eurasian	
1923	Don't Call It Love	Rita Coventry	Lost film
1924	The Breaking Point	Beverly Carlysle	A copy is held at the Library of Congress
1924	A Sainted Devil	Carlotta	Lost film
1925	The Lady Who Lied	Fifi	Lost film
1925	The Marriage Whirl	Toinette	Lost film
1925	Clothes Make the Pirate	Madame De La Tour	Lost film trailer survives
1925	Cobra	Elise Van Zile	
1925	What Price Beauty?	Herself	Lost film
1926	The Miracle of Life	Helen	Lost film
1926	The Unfair Sex	Blanchita D'Acosta	Lost film
1926	The Mountain Eagle	Beatrice	Lost film
1926	The Nude Woman	Princesse de Chabrant	Lost film
1927	Die Pratermizzi	Valette - Tänzerin mit der Larve	

== Sources ==
- Dooley, Mary, Certificate and Record of Birth, No. 2662, Manhattan Borough, November 13, 1894 (registered January 1895)
- 1900 United States Federal Census, Manhattan, New York, New York, June 1, 1900, Enumeration District 930, Sheet 2A.
- 1910 United States Federal Census, Manhattan Ward 19, New York, New York, April 15–16, 1910, Enumeration District 1043, Sheet 3B.
