= Cañas y barro (TV series) =

Spanish television series (1978)

- Genre: Period drama
- Based on: Cañas y barro by Vicente Blasco Ibáñez
- Screenplay by: Manuel Mur Oti
- Directed by: Rafael Romero Marchent
- Country of origin: Spain
- Original language: Spanish
- No. of seasons: 1
- No. of episodes: 6

Production
- Running time: 55 min (approx.)
- Production company: TVE

Original release
- Network: TVE1
- Release: 26 March – 30 April 1978

Related
- La barraca Arroz y tartana

Cañas y barro (lit. 'Reeds and Mud') is a Spanish limited television series adapting the novel of the same name by Vicente Blasco Ibáñez. It aired in 1978 on TVE1.

== Premise ==
The fiction is set in El Palmar, a village in La Albufera lagoon, in fin-de-siècle Spain, between the 19th and 20th centuries. The plot features the strife between fishers (the old) and rice farmers (the new) as backdrop.

== Cast ==
- José Bódalo as Cañamel.
- Alfredo Mayo as el Tío Paloma.
- Manuel Tejada as Tono.
- Luis Suárez as Tonet.
- Terele Pávez as Samaruca.
- Victoria Vera as Neleta.
- Ana Marzoa as Rosa.

== Production and release ==
Cañas y barro is an adaptation of the 1902 novel of the same name by Vicente Blasco Ibáñez. The novel had been already adapted to a feature film format with the Juan de Orduña's 1954 film Cañas y barro. The series was shot in the northern hemisphere Autumn/Winter of 1977 in the same location the fiction takes place, in La Albufera and El Palmar. Adapted to screen by Manuel Mur Oti, the episodes were directed by Rafael Romero Marchent. It consisted of 6 episodes featuring a running time of about 55 minutes. The production had a 70 million peseta budget. It aired on a weekly basis from 26 March 1978 to 30 April 1978. It became the most watched fiction series of the year, and second in general to the documentary series El hombre y la Tierra (non-fiction).

Series	Episodes	Originally released		Viewership	Ref.
Series	Episodes	First released	Last released	Viewership	Ref.
1	6	26 March 1978	30 April 1978	17,000,000	
