= Thank You (1925 film) =

1925 film directed by John Ford

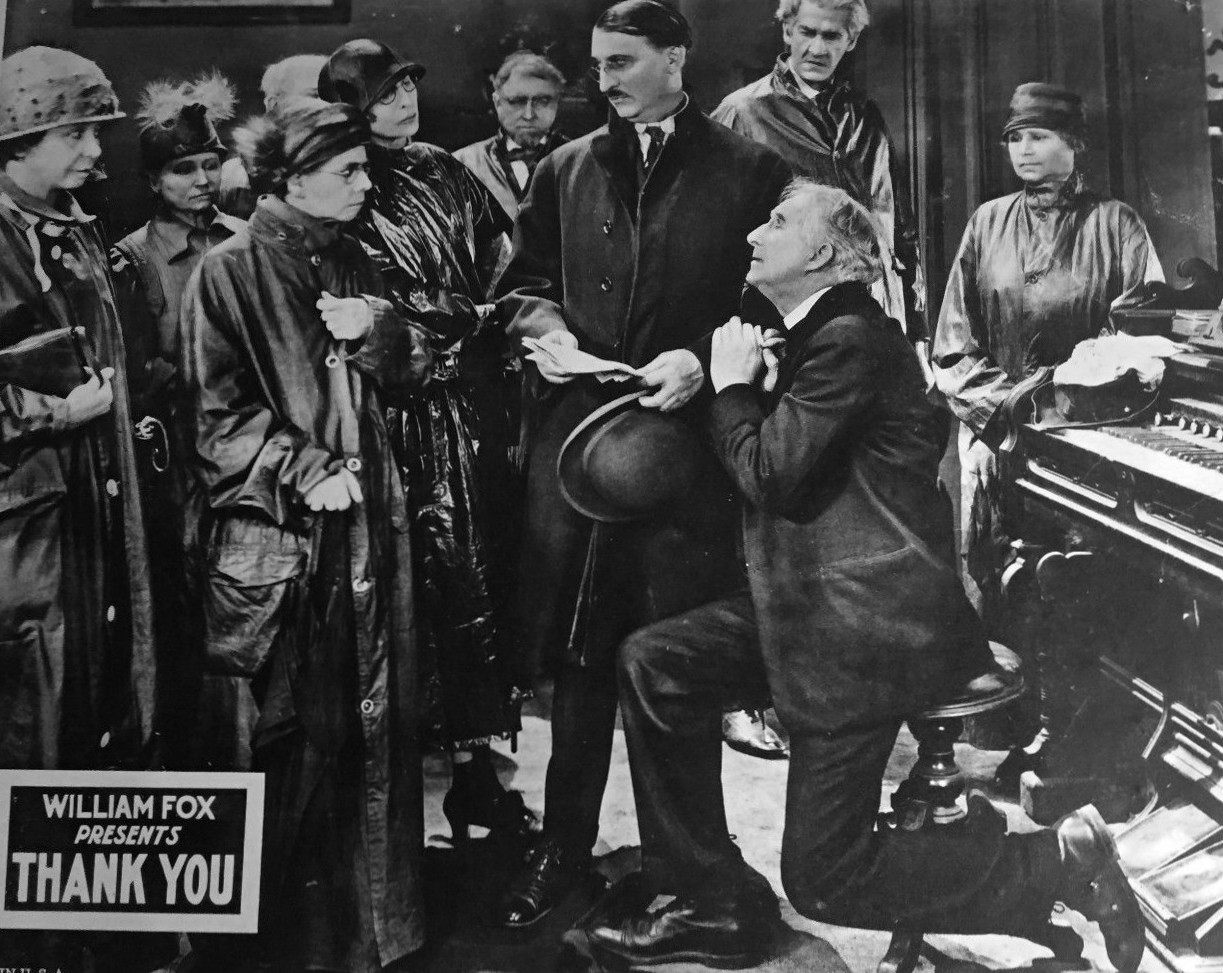
- Lobby card
- Directed by: John Ford
- Written by: Frances Marion
- Based on: Thank You by Winchell Smith and Tom Cushing
- Produced by: John Golden
- Starring: Alec B. Francis; Jacqueline Logan
- Cinematography: George Schneiderman
- Distributed by: Fox Film Corporation
- Release date: November 1, 1925
- Running time: 70 minutes
- Country: United States
- Language: Silent (English intertitles)

Thank You is a lost 1925 American comedy film directed by John Ford. This film is based on a 1921 Broadway play, Thank You, by Winchell Smith and Tom Cushing.

== Plot ==
As described in a film magazine review, a millionaire banishes his wild son to a chicken farm near a small, slow town. Excitement comes with the arrival from Paris of the local minister’s daughter, for whom the Parisian modistes have done their utmost. She and the young man hit it off too well to please the village gossips, but the gossips lose on every point.

== Cast ==
- Alec B. Francis as David Lee
- Jacqueline Logan as Diane Lee
- George O'Brien as Kenneth Jamieson
- J. Farrell MacDonald as Andy
- George Fawcett as Cornelius Jamieson
- Cyril Chadwick as Mr. Jones
- Edith Bostwick as Mrs. Jones
- Marion Harlan as Milly Jones
- Vivia Ogden as Miss Blodgett
- James Neill as Doctor Cobb
- Billy Rinaldi as Sweet, Jr.
- Aileen Manning as Hannah
- Maurice Murphy as Willie Jones
- Robert Milasch as Sweet, Sr.
- Ida Moore as Gossiping Woman
- Frankie Bailey as Gossiping Man
- William Courtright (uncredited)
- Richard Cummings (uncredited)
- Tommy Hicks as Fat kid (uncredited)
- Francis Powers as Gossiping Man (uncredited)
- Lassie Lou Ahern as Child (uncredited)

== Preservation ==
With no holdings located in archives, Thank You is considered to be a lost film.

== See also ==
- List of lost films
