= Blood and Sand (play) =

American play

Blood and Sand is a play in four acts by Tom Cushing. It is based on Vicente Blasco Ibáñez's 1908 Spanish-language novel Blood and Sand (English: Sangre y arena). Both the novel and Cushing's play were the basis for the 1922 silent film Blood and Sand starring Rudolph Valentino. Set in Madrid, the play tells the story of a Spanish bullfighter who is betrayed by both the woman he loves and his ardent and bloodthirsty fans.

== History ==
Cushing's play debuted on Broadway at the Empire Theatre on September 20, 1921, where it ran for a total of 71 performances. The production was produced by Charles Frohman, and starred actor Otis Skinner as Juan Gallardo and actress Catherine Calvert as Dona Sol. The play also marked the professional debut of Skinner's daughter, the actress Cornelia Otis Skinner, in the role of Dona Sarasate. Others in the original cast included Clara T. Bracy as Señora Angustias, Romaine Callender as El Nacional, Guy Nichols as Antonio, Louis Calvert as Dr. Ruiz, Shirley Gale as Condesa De Torrealta, Charles N. Greene as Marques De Miura, John Rogers as Garabato, Eleanor Seybolt as Dona Luisa, Claude Gouraud as Monsenor, Victor Hammond as Pedro, William Lorenz as Don Jose, Devah Morel as Mariana, Freddie Verdi as Juanillo, and Octavia Kenmore as Encarnacion among others.

Critical reception of Blood and Sand praised the performances of the play's stars more-so than its script; although many felt Otis Skinner was too old to play the part of Juan Gallardo while admiring his acting.
