= Vicente Gómez (composer) =

Spanish guitarist and composer (1911-2001)

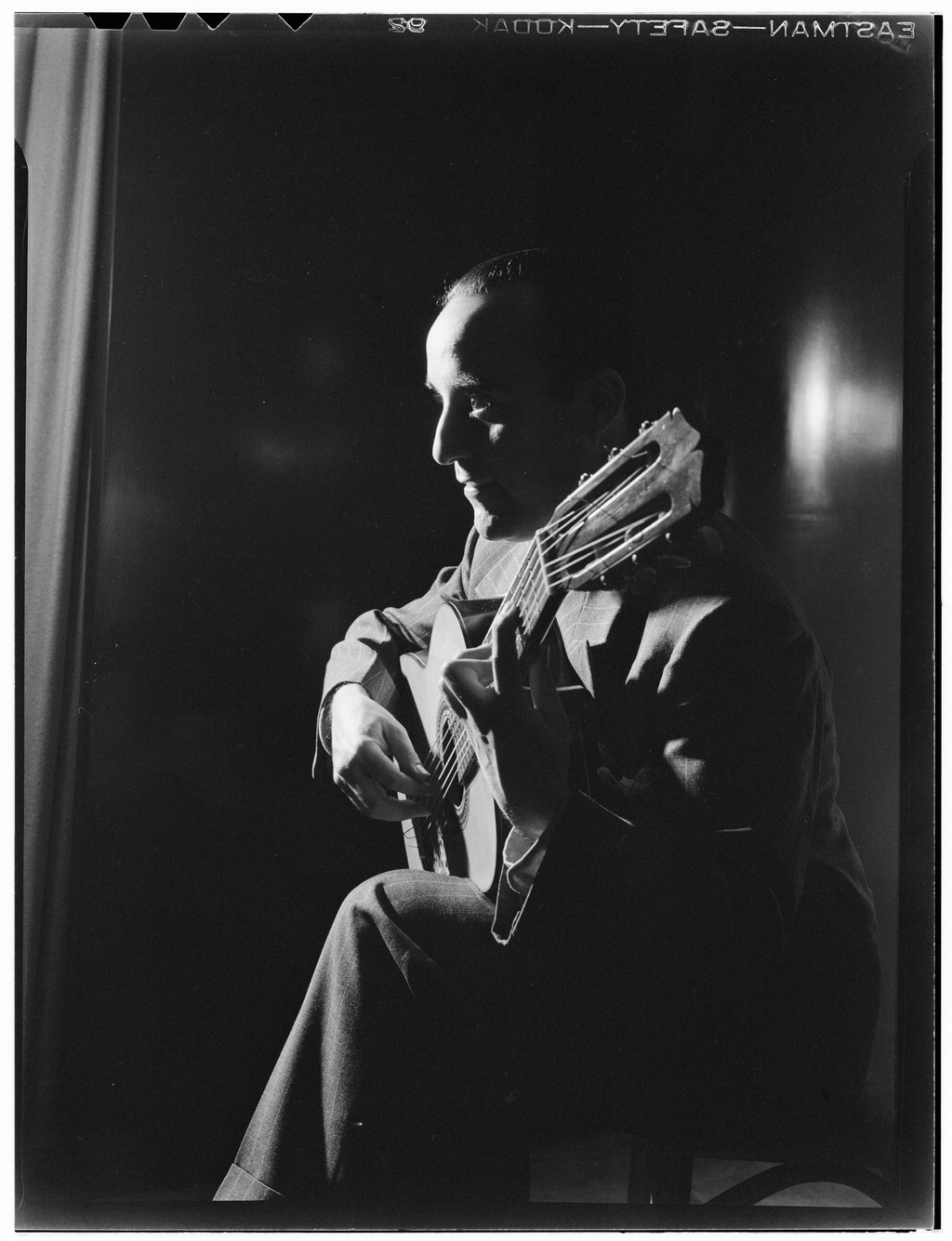
- Gómez in 1946
- Born: July 8, 1911; Madrid
- Died: December 23, 2001 (aged 90)

Vicente Gómez (8 July 1911 – 23 December 2001) was a Spanish guitarist. He also composed, arranged, and taught classical Spanish guitar music.

== Biography ==
Gómez was born in Madrid, where he learned his trade in a tavern owned by his father, located in the red-light district of Madrid. He worked there until he was 25 when he visited Russia. He was involved in politics and opposed to General Franco. He visited Cuba and Mexico, and he was discovered while making a radio show in Mexico.

He worked in New York and toured South America. In 1943, he became a U.S. citizen and served in the American army. In 1950 he performed in the Cary Grant film Crisis as the guitarist Cariago in an uncredited performance. In the 1950s, he signed with American Decca Records, he composed for Hollywood films, and then he retired to compose and teach. Gómez's students included Ricky Nelson and the wife of Omar Bradley.

== Musical compositions ==
Original theme for guitar and orchestra, soundtrack of the film Blood and Sand (1941), played by the composer himself.

"Verde luna" (Green Moon), rumba Bolero, also featured in Blood and Sand. It was recorded by Alfredo Antonini and his orchestra featuring Victoria Cordova and John Serry Sr. in 1949, and also recorded by the Italian accordionist Beppe Junior in 2003 for his album Liscioterapia (Europlay, CD 0189).

== Legacy ==
The archives of Vicente Gomez, which document his music library collection, his original compositions, teaching career, and his days in the U.S. Army, which includes scores, photographs, sound recordings, are held at the University Library at California State University, Northridge.
