= Eleanor P. Cushing =

American mathematics professor

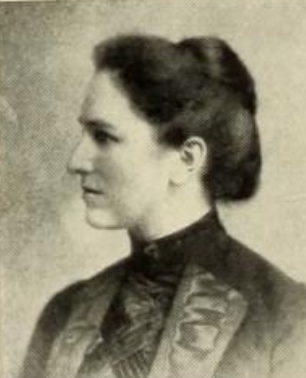
- Eleanor P. Cushing, from the 1907 yearbook of Smith College
- Born: December 27, 1856; Bath, Maine
- Died: April 21, 1925; Bath, Maine
- Occupation: Mathematics professor
- Relatives: Tom Cushing (nephew)

Eleanor Philbrook Cushing (December 27, 1856 – April 21, 1925) was an American mathematics professor, on the faculty of Smith College from 1881 to 1922.

== Early life and education ==
Cushing was born in Bath, Maine, the daughter of Samuel Woodward Cushing and Mary Ann Mereen Cushing. Her father was a merchant. Her brother William Lee Cushing taught Latin at Yale and ran the Westminster School in Connecticut. Playwright Tom Cushing was her nephew.

Cushing was a member of Smith College's first graduating class in 1879. She earned a master's degree in 1882.

== Career ==
After graduating from Smith College, she taught school in Bath and New Haven, then became a member of the Smith College faculty from 1881 to 1922, as professor of mathematics and chair of the department. She was also president of the college's Alumnae Association and the undergraduate Mathematics Club.

In 1890, she was named to the Commission Of Colleges On Admission Examinations In New England. "It displeased her to be called professor and she could not be persuaded to wear an academic cap and gown—never appearing where they were required," Laurenus Clark Seelye recalled of Cushing's disdain for "ostentatious display". She resigned as professor emerita, and retired to Maine.

== Personal life ==
Cushing inherited a Queen Anne-style house in Northampton, Massachusetts from her friend, Elizabeth Jarvis Hopkins. She lived there from 1897 to 1922, then donated the building to Smith College. She died in 1925, in Bath, aged 69 years. Cushing House residence which was built in 1922 on the campus of Smith College is named for her.
