= The Miracle of Life (1926 film) =

1926 silent film

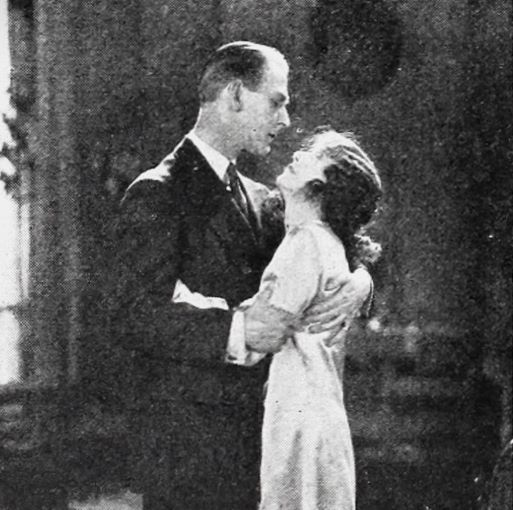
- Film still
- Directed by: Stanner E.V. Taylor
- Written by: Elizabeth Musgrave; Olga Printzlau
- Starring: Percy Marmont; Mae Busch; Nita Naldi
- Cinematography: Alexander G. Penrod
- Production company: S.E.V. Taylor Productions
- Distributed by: Associated Exhibitors
- Release date: February 28, 1926
- Running time: 50 minutes
- Country: United States
- Language: Silent (English intertitles)

The Miracle of Life is a 1926 American silent drama film directed by Stanner E.V. Taylor and starring Percy Marmont, Mae Busch, and Nita Naldi.

== Plot ==
As described in a film magazine review, a husband wants a family, but his wife Janet prefers freedom and gaiety. She has a dream of being aged, alone, and childless, and decides that her husband is right after all.

== Cast ==
- Percy Marmont as Blair Howell
- Mae Busch as Janet Howell
- Nita Naldi as Helen

== Reception ==
Because the film includes a scene where the wife anticipates a visit to an illegal abortion provider and intimate discussions between the husband and wife, the Film Daily classified the film as "NOT AT ALL SUITABLE FOR GENERAL ENTERTAINMENT" and "NOT APPROPRIATE FOR FAMILY TRADE".

== Censorship ==
At the time of the film's release, many cities and states had censorship boards which could ban the showing of a film for improper material. For example, the Virginia State Board of Censors rejected The Miracle of Life due to its theme of abortion. In Kansas, the Board of Censorship banned the film, but this was overturned by the Board of Appeal, perhaps because of the happy family ending.

== Preservation ==
With no prints of The Miracle of Life located in any film archives, it is a lost film.

== Bibliography ==
- Donald W. McCaffrey & Christopher P. Jacobs. Guide to the Silent Years of American Cinema. Greenwood Publishing, 1999. ISBN 0-313-30345-2
