= Cherry Heering =

Danish cherry liqueur

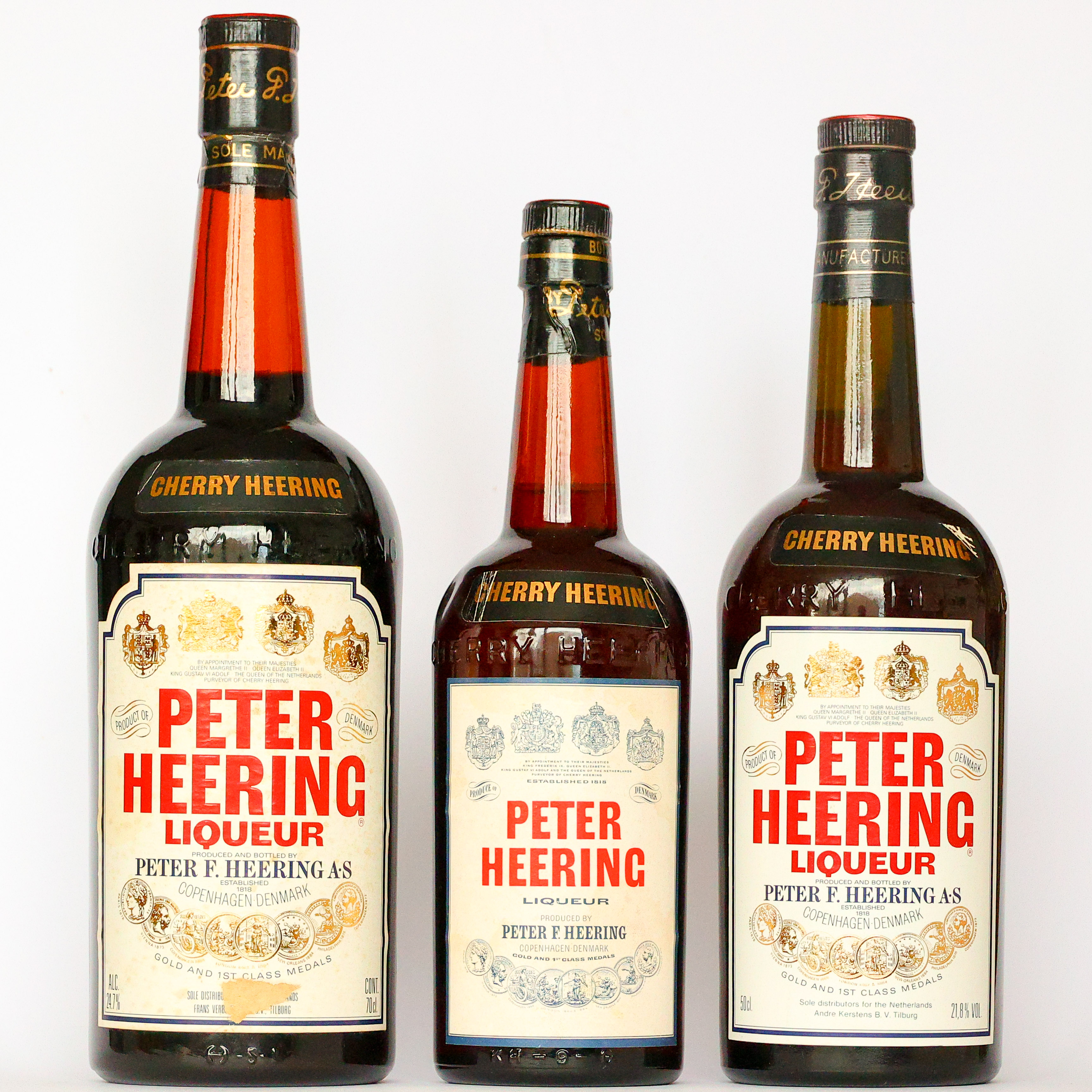
Bottles of Heering Cherry Liqueur

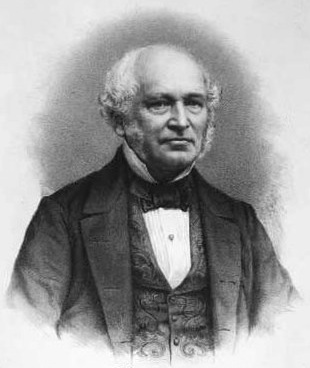
Peter Frederik Suhm Heering (1792–1875), Danish merchant and businessman, inventor of Cherry Heering Liqueur

Heering Cherry Liqueur is a Danish liqueur flavored with cherries. It is often referred to simply as Peter Heering or Cherry Heering in cocktail recipes.

== History and Uses ==
Heering Cherry Liqueur has been produced since 1818, and the company is purveyor to the Royal Danish Court and formerly to Queen Elizabeth II. It is sold in more than 100 countries.

Heering Cherry Liqueur is an ingredient of cocktails including the Singapore Sling and Blood & Sand. Cherry Heering is used in baking; some of the alcohol evaporates as part of the process.

Historically produced by the Peter F. Heering company in Denmark, the liqueur brand was acquired by Dutch spirits group DeKuyper for an undisclosed sum in October 2017.
