= Mare Nostrum (1926 film) =

1926 film by Rex Ingram

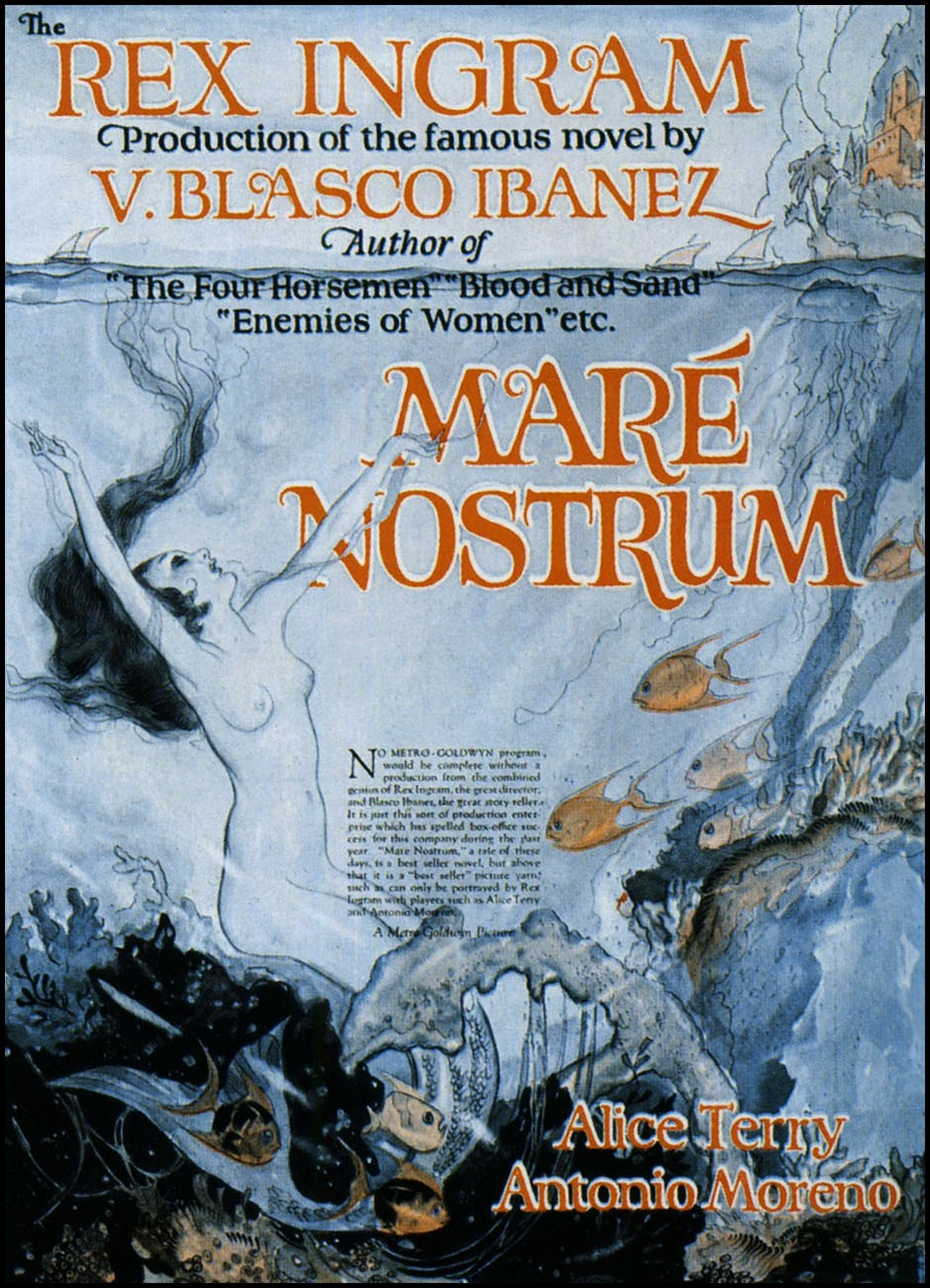
- Directed by: Rex Ingram
- Written by: Willis Goldbeck
- Based on: Mare Nostrum by Vicente Blasco Ibáñez
- Produced by: Rex Ingram
- Starring: Antonio Moreno; Alice Terry
- Cinematography: John F. Seitz
- Edited by: Grant Whytock
- Music by: William Axt
- Distributed by: MGM
- Release date: February 15, 1926
- Running time: 102 minutes
- Country: United States
- Language: Silent (English intertitles)

Mare Nostrum is a 1926 American silent war drama film directed by Rex Ingram. It was the first production made by Ingram while in voluntary exile and stars Ingram's wife, Alice Terry. The film is set during World War I, and follows a Spanish merchant sailor who becomes involved with a German spy. It is based on the novel of the same name by Vicente Blasco Ibáñez. Long thought lost, the film was re-discovered in 1994.

== Plot ==
Mare Nostrum (1926)

As a young boy growing up in a Spanish family with a long, seafaring history, Ulysses Ferragut tells tales of the sea; Stories written by his retired uncle, the "Triton". He is particularly fascinated by his claim to have once seen the sea goddess Amphitrite. Though his father, Don Esteban, wants him to follow in his footsteps, Ulysses becomes a sailor.

When he is a grown man, Ulysses uses his life savings to purchase the Mare Nostrum, a fast, modern freighter, and prospers. However, he finally gives in to his wife, Doña Cinta, for the sake of their son Esteban, and agrees to sell his ship. With the outbreak of World War I, however, the enormous profits to be made from the sudden demand for shipping ends this plan.

On a stop in Italy, Ulysses visits the ruins of Pompeii, and meets Freya Talberg and the learned Doctor Fedelmann. He soon falls in love with Freya (who looks exactly like his uncle's painting of Amphitrite). Though she later informs him that she is an Austrian spy (as is Fedelmann), Spain is neutral and his ardor is undiminished. He agrees to transport Count Kaledine to a secret rendezvous in the Mediterranean. The U-boat U-35 surfaces, takes on fuel from Ulysses' ship, and departs with Kaledine.

Meanwhile, young Esteban leaves home without permission to find his father. After a week waiting for Ulysses at his lodgings, Esteban goes back to Barcelona aboard the Californian, a British passenger ship. However, the boy is killed when the Californian is sunk by the U-35. Ulysses learns of his son's fate from a survivor, and realizes to his grief his role in the tragedy. He vows to avenge his boy.

Upon hearing of the death, Freya sends Ulysses a letter denouncing the barbarity of the act; it is intercepted by Doctor Fedelmann. That, along with Freya's admission she has fallen in love with Ulysses, convinces Fedelmann that her subordinate can no longer be trusted. She sends Freya to Marseille, intending to betray her to the French. Freya suspects as much, and begs Ulysses to take her to safety aboard his ship. Ulysses is torn, but a vision of his son shaking his head makes him refuse. Freya is later captured, convicted, and shot by a firing squad at dawn.

As he is leaving Freya's apartment, Ulysses encounters Count Kaledine. After a brief struggle, he chases Kaledine through the streets, gathering a mob. Kaledine is caught and taken into custody.

Ulysses then employs the Mare Nostrum in the service of the Allies, arming her with a deck gun, replacing his crew with French military sailors, and transporting munitions to Salonica. Only longtime family friend and sea cook Caragol refuses to leave him. On the voyage, they are intercepted by the U-35. With the Mare Nostrum torpedoed and doomed, Ulysses mans the abandoned deck gun and sinks the U-35. As Ulysses descends into the ocean depths, Amphitrite rises to embrace and kiss him.

== Cast ==
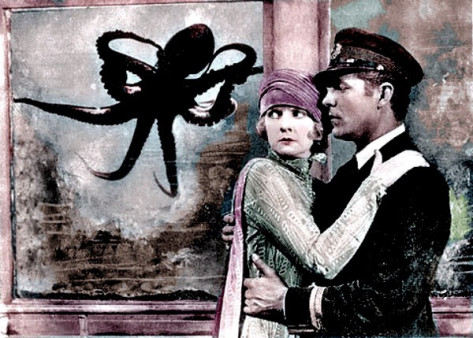
Screen shot with Alice Terry and Antonio Moreno

- Alice Terry as Freya Talberg / Amphitrite
- Antonio Moreno as Ulysses Ferragut
- Apollon (Louis Uni) as The Triton
- Álex Nova as Don Esteban Ferragut
- Kada-Abd-el-Kader as Young Ulysses
- Hughie Mack as Caragol
- Mickey Brantford as Esteban Ferragut
- Mademoiselle Kithnou as Dona Cinta (credited as Kithnou)
- Rosita Ramírez as Pepita, Ulysses' Niece
- Frédéric Mariotti as Toni, the Mate
- Pâquerette as Doctor Fedelmann (credited as Mme. Paquerette)
- Fernand Mailly as Count Kaledine
- Andrews Engelmann as Submarine Commander (credited as André von Engelman)
- John George as a Servant (uncredited)

== Production ==
"Between Europe and Africa stretching from Gibraltar to the Syrian Coast, lies the Mediterranean, land-locked and tideless, known to the ancients as Mare Nostrum—'Our Sea'...Upon its bosom mankind spread the first sail, from its depths the sea gods were born."—Opening titles for Mare Nostrum (1926).

Rex Ingram's reputation as an outstanding Hollywood director rested on the enormous success of his 1921 The Four Horsemen of the Apocalypse, a film adaption of Spanish novelist Vicente Blasco Ibáñez ’s work that had, according to Kevin Brownlow “made a star of Valentino, saved Metro Pictures from bankruptcy, and earned the director the undying gratitude of the head of Metro, Marcus Loew.” Ingram was determined to adapt another Ibáñez novel, his 1918 Mare Nostrum, “an epic tale of World War I espionage and naval battles.” The title was taken from the Latin term used by ancient Romans for the Mediterranean Sea.

Ingram purchased the former Gaumont studio located in Nice, France, financed by M-G-M preliminary to making Mare Nostrum. The facility required extensive upgrades, and regional technical services support was inadequate. Film archivist Kevin Brownlow writes:

“The glass roofs of the [Gaumont] studio created a furnace in the daytime, while at night, when a lot of the filming took place, arctic temperatures were recorded...French laboratories were found to be unsatisfactory. The London laboratories were too far away. Equipment set up in the studios developed defects and much negative was found to be unusable and necessitated many retakes. Eventually, technicians had to be brought in from Hollywood for this work.”

The film adaptation required location shooting in France, Italy and Spain, obliging Ingram to allot the sequences shot in Barcelona to his cinematographer John F. Seitz. Mare Nostrum took 15 months to complete.

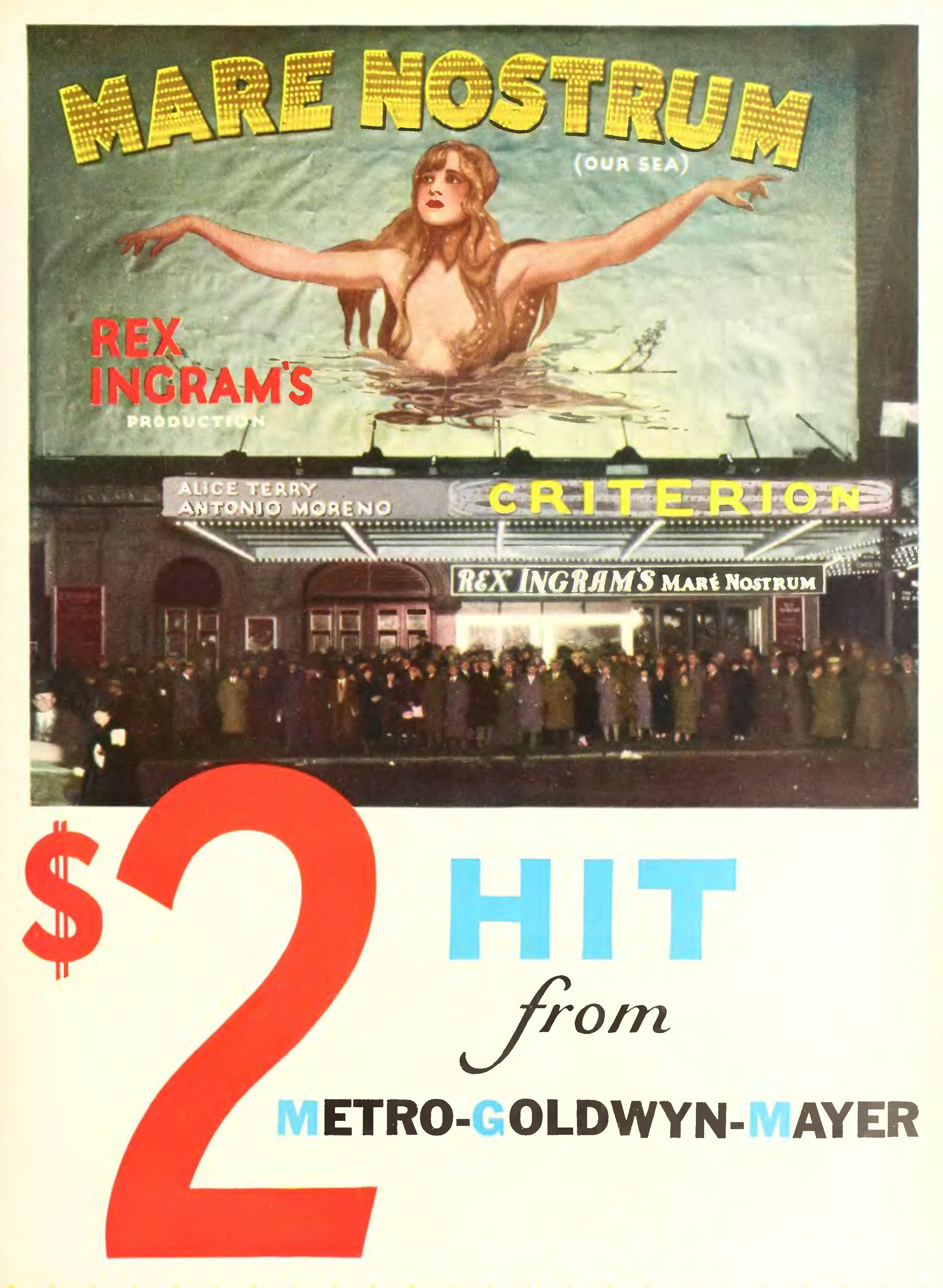
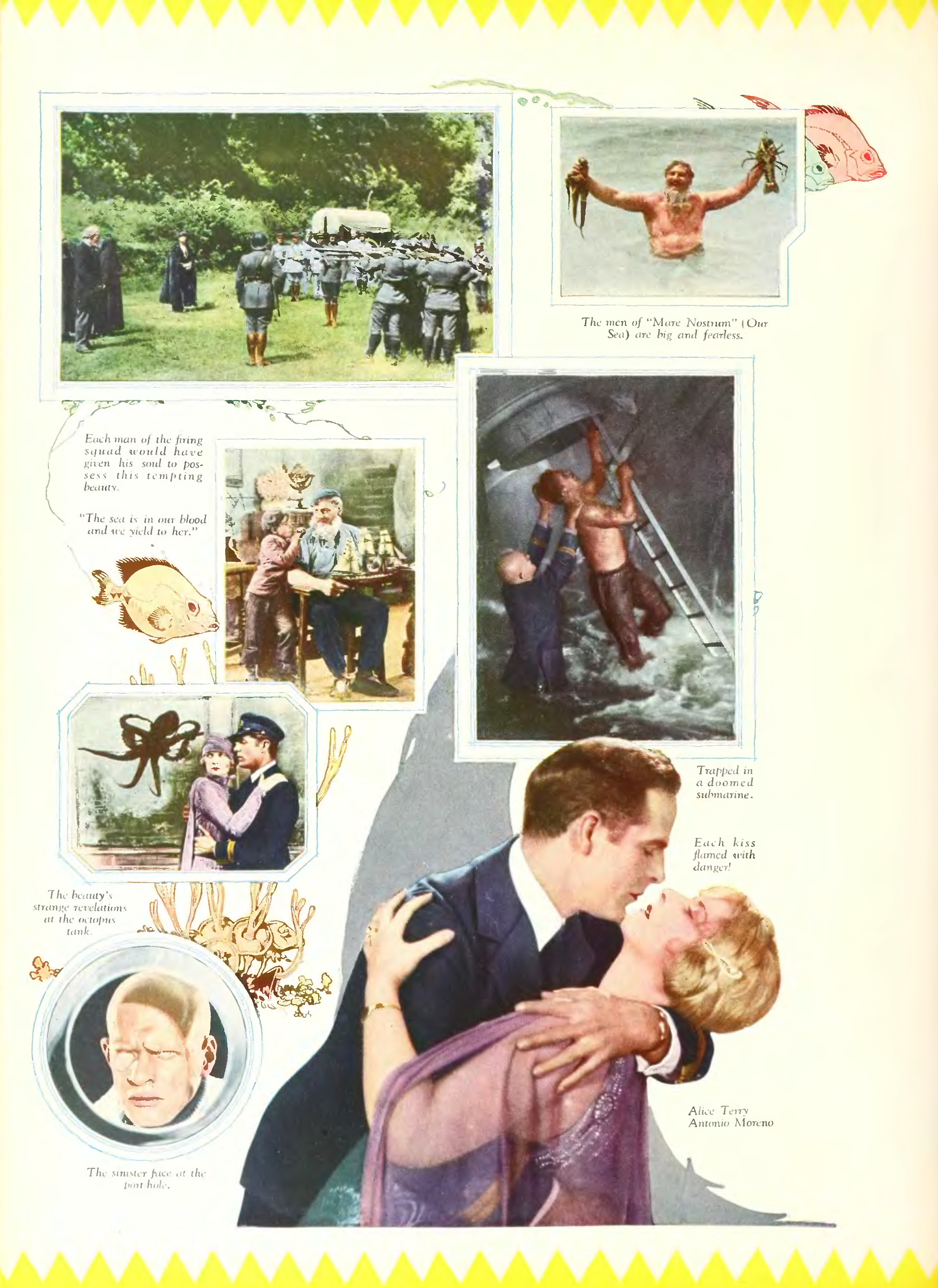
Mare Nostrum ads in Motion Picture News, 1926

A highly regarded sequence in Mare Nostrum depicts spy Freya Talberg's execution by German authorities for treason. Film archivist Kevin Brownlow describes it as “perhaps the finest sequence Ingram ever shot.” Film historian Charles Higham describes Ingram's cinematic handling of her demise:

"Many sequences are admirably realized, but none as admirably as Freya’s (Alice Terry) downfall and ruin. Caught up by her own side, she is imprisoned and shot: Amphitrite is mortal after all. No one who saw it could forget the execution at Vincennes, her arrival by limousine, dressed in fashionable clothes (‘I shall die in my uniform’), her lofty bravery quenched by the actual sight of the rifles, her single horrifying glimpse of the coffin waiting to carry her away...Ingram never again equaled this sequence.”

From the over one million feet of film Ingram shot, his editing produced a four-hour rough cut. The studio made further cuts, including scenes deemed anti-German by that country's embassy. Mare Nostrum, with a running time of just under two-hours premiered at New York's Criterion Theatre on 15 February 1926.

== Critical and popular response ==
“Rex Ingram, a major talent who specialized in big films, was more a painter than a movie director, with little sense of pace and rhythm, [possessing] at best a superb pictorial flair. His finest work was Mare Nostrum (1926).”—Film historian Charles Higham in The Art of the American Film: 1900-1971. (1973).

Mare Nostrum opened to encouraging critical reviews, though both Motion Picture Magazine and Variety reported that audience response at its premier was unimpressive. Ingram insisted on retaining the original title from Ibáñez's novel, which some critics and audiences found perplexing (mare is Latin for “sea”, in English, a “female horse”).

Movie-goers of Spanish and Italian descent flocked to the Mediterranean-themed picture at New York's Capitol Theatre, grossing M-G-M almost $20,000 in the first two weeks of its release.

Post-World War I nationalism in Europe polarized the reaction to Mare Nostrum, which depicts a German U-boat destruction of a Spanish merchant ship. The film was praised in France and banned in Germany. Metro-Goldwyn-Mayer issued a mea culpa to placate their European markets.

== Influence ==
Ingram positioned the notable love scene between Alice Terry and Antonio Moreno in front of a large aquarium tank featuring a large octopus, eliciting audience “annoyance” at Mare Nostrum’s New York premier. Director Orson Welles admired it, adapting the imagery for the seduction scene from his The Lady from Shanghai (1947).

The young Michael Powell worked as an apprentice grip on the film, having been introduced by set designer Harry Lachman. He later credited Ingram's Mare Nostrum with influencing his own directorial efforts, among them Black Narcissus (1947) and The Red Shoes (1948).

== Sound remake ==
A second film version of Mare Nostrum, this one a sound film, was made in Spanish in 1948. It starred Fernando Rey and María Félix, and was directed by Rafael Gil, who, the year before, had directed the first full-length Spanish film version of the 1869 Don Quixote ballet, based on the early 17th century novel by Miguel de Cervantes.

== Sources ==
- Brownlow, Kevin. 2018. Mare Nostrum. San Francisco Silent Film Festival. https://silentfilm.org/mare-nostrum/ Retrieved 14 June 2021.
- Higham, Charles. 1973. The Art of the American Film: 1900-1971. Doubleday & Company, Inc. New York. ISBN 0-385-06935-9
- Miller. Frank. 2004. Mare Nostrum. Turner Classic Movies. Retrieved 13 June 2021.

== External Sources ==
- Mare Nostrum at the AFI Catalog of Feature Films
- Mare Nostrum at IMDb
- Mare Nostrum at the TCM Movie Database (archived)
- Mare Nostrum at silentera.com
- Lobby poster, theatrical; $2 asking price for theater entrance
- Stills at silentsaregolden.com
- Film clip at tcm.com
- Mare Nostrum (1926) trailer for restored film on YouTube
- Mare Nostrum (1926) restored film on YouTube
