= Blood and Sand (cocktail) =

Scotch based cocktail

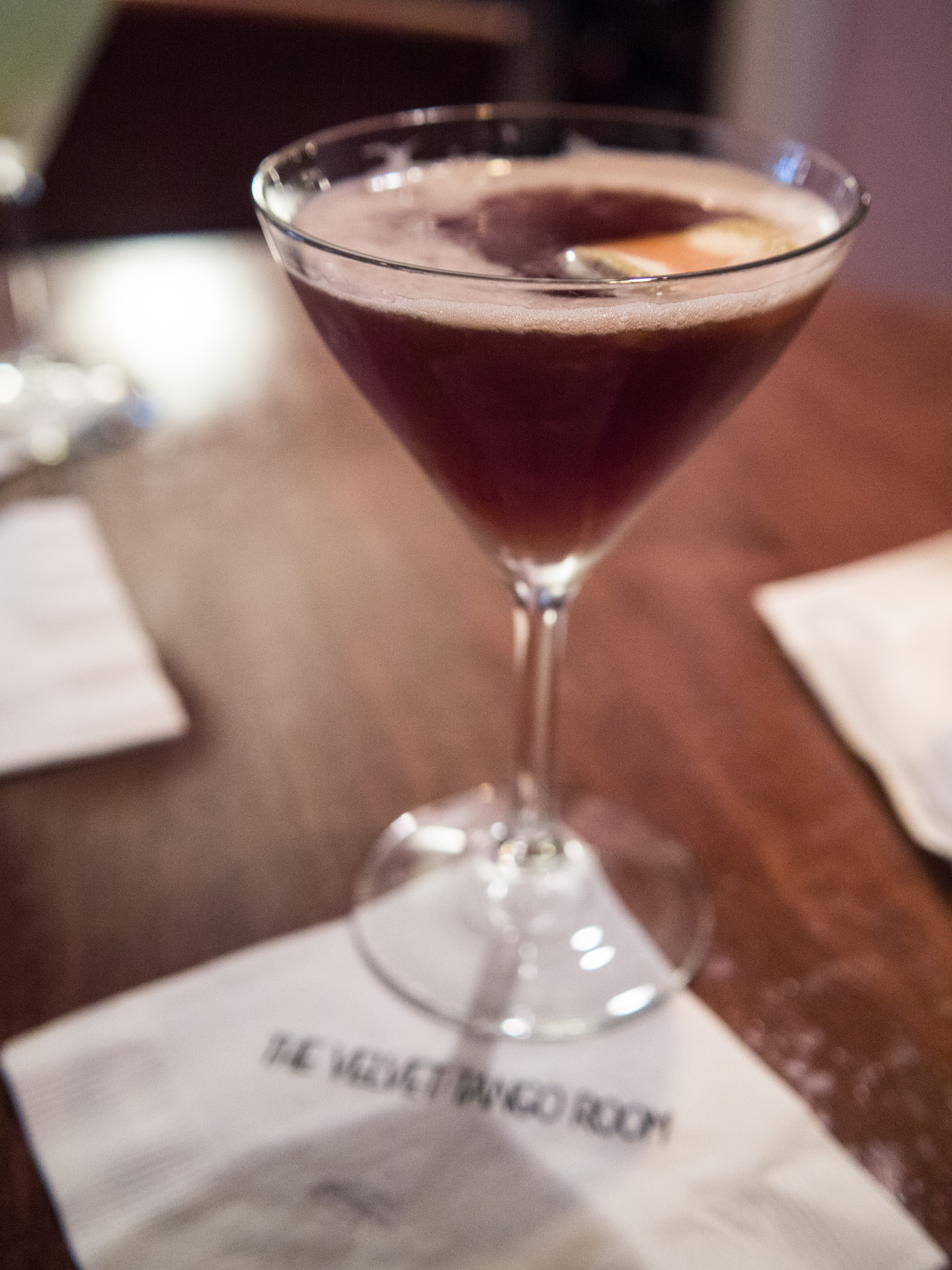
- Ingredients: ¾ oz blended scotch; ¾ oz blood orange juice; ¾ oz sweet vermouth; ¾ oz Cherry Heering
- Standard drinkware: Cocktail glass
- Standard garnish: Maraschino cherry, Flamed orange zest
- Served: Straight up: chilled, without ice
- Preparation: Pour all ingredients into cocktail shaker filled with ice cubes. Shake well. Strain into Cocktail glass. Flame orange zest over the top of the glass.

Blood and Sand is one of the few classic mixed drinks that includes Scotch whisky. It was named after Rudolph Valentino's 1922 bullfighter movie Blood and Sand. The red juice of the blood orange in the drink helped link it with the film. The recipe is first known to have appeared in the 1930 Savoy Cocktail Book.

== Preparation and serving ==
The blood and sand is usually served in a coupe glass, also known as the champagne coupe. Its main ingredients include blood orange juice, sweet vermouth, cherry heering and scotch. To prepare the cocktail, pour and shake all ingredients in a shaker. Then, double strain the mix in a coupe glass, and garnish with a slice of blood orange.
