= The Shack (1945 film) =

1945 film

- Directed by: Roberto Gavaldón
- Written by: Libertad Blasco Ibáñez; Tito Davison; Paulino Masip; Abel Velilla
- Based on: The Shack by Vicente Blasco Ibáñez
- Produced by: Alfonso Sánchez Tello
- Starring: Domingo Soler; Anita Blanch; Amparo Morillo
- Cinematography: Víctor Herrera
- Edited by: Carlos Savage
- Music by: Baltasar Samper
- Production company: Clasa Films Mundiales
- Release date: 27 May 1945
- Running time: 110 minutes
- Country: Mexico
- Language: Spanish

The Shack or The Hut (Spanish: La barraca) is a 1945 Mexican drama film directed by Roberto Gavaldón and starring Domingo Soler, Anita Blanch and Amparo Morillo. It is based on the 1898 novel of the same title by Vicente Blasco Ibáñez. The film's sets were designed by the art directors Francisco Marco Chillet and Vicente Petit.

== Cast ==
- Domingo Soler as Batiste Borrull
- Anita Blanch as Teresa
- Amparo Morillo as Roseta
- José Baviera as Pimento
- Luana Alcañiz as Pepeta
- Manolo Fábregas as Tonet
- Narciso Busquets as Batistet
- Manuel Noriega as Tío Tomba
- Rafael Icardo as Pascual Guillot, el tio Barret
- José Morcillo as don Joaquin, maestro de escuela
- Conchita Carracedo as Sobrina de pimento
- Joaquín Roche hijo as Pascualet
- Daniel Pastor as Nicolás
- David Behar as Ramón
- Carlos Villarías as Tabernero
- Jorge Mondragón as Huertano
- Marichu Labra as Rosario
- Felipe Montoya as Don Salvador, usurero de la ciudad
- María Calvo as Doña Manuela
- Micaela Castejón as Esposa del tío Barret
- Raúl Lechuga as Huertano
- Paco Martínez as Médico
- Rosa María Montes as Hija del tío Barret
- Luis Mussot as Señor cura
- Hernán Vera as Huertano

== Bibliography ==
- Paulo Antonio Paranaguá. Mexican Cinema. British Film Institute, 1995.
