= The Shack (Blasco Ibáñez novel) =

1898 novel by Vicente Blasco Ibáñez

- Author: Vicente Blasco Ibáñez
- Original title: La barraca
- Language: Spanish
- Publication date: 1898
- Publication place: Spain
- Media type: Print

The Shack or The Hut (Spanish: La barraca) is an 1898 novel by the Spanish writer Vicente Blasco Ibáñez. Its English translation sold over a million copies.

It was adapted into a Mexican film The Shack in 1945 and a Televisión Española television series La barraca in 1979.

== Plot ==
The novel is set in Valencia in the Valencia in the 19th centuary. It depicts in detail the harsh living conditions of the peasant and agricultural population. Uncle Barret is unable to continue working the huerta that his ancestors had cultivated for generations because he cannot afford to pay the rent to the landowner, Don Salvador. As a result, the villagers, led by Pepeta and Pimentó, conspire to prevent anyone from working the plot again.

This changes when Batiste and his family—his wife Teresa and their children Roseta, Batistet, and Pasqualet, as well as two younger children whose names are not mentioned—arrive in the area. Driven by necessity, they settle on the property and agree to cultivate the abandoned land in exchange for a two-year exemption from rent payments. From that point on, they are relentlessly harassed by the rest of the community, who accuse them of complying with the landowner's demands and thereby harming the interests of the collective.

The harassment reaches its climax when Batiste's younger children become involved in a confrontation with other village children, as a result of which the young Pasqualet dies. A feeling of guilt and compassion briefly takes hold of the community.

However, this proves temporary. Batiste gets into a fight with Pimentó in a tavern, and a few days later, after Batiste is shot, he retaliates by mortally wounding his attacker, who turns out to be Pimentó. Retaliation follows quickly: the barraca where the Batiste family lives is set on fire, forcing them to leave the village.

== Bibliography ==
- Martha Eulalia Altisent. A Companion to the Twentieth-century Spanish Novel. Boydell & Brewer Ltd, 2008.
