= La barraca (TV series) =

Spanish television series (1979)

- Genre: Historical drama
- Based on: The Shack by Vicente Blasco Ibáñez
- Screenplay by: Manuel Mur Oti
- Directed by: León Klimovsky
- Composer: Alfonso Santisteban
- Country of origin: Spain
- Original language: Spanish
- No. of seasons: 1
- No. of episodes: 9

Production
- Producer: Eduardo Manzanos
- Cinematography: Manuel Merino
- Editor: Renata Merino
- Running time: 540 min.
- Production company: Televisión Española
- Budget: 81 million ₧

Original release
- Network: La Primera
- Release: 1 October – 11 October 1979

La barraca (transl. The shack) is a Spanish prime-time television series based on the 1898 novel of the same name by Vicente Blasco Ibáñez. Produced by Aldebarán Films for Televisión Española (TVE), it was directed by León Klimovsky, with screenplay by Manuel Mur Oti. Its nine episodes adapting the novel were broadcast on La Primera of Televisión Española in 1979.

== Plot ==
Uncle Barret's family has to leave the shack, unable to pay the debts owed to the owner, Don Salvador. Uncle Barret, full of anger, kills him and is imprisoned. The shack is occupied by Batiste's family, who are not well received by the locals. From the initial rejection it turns to violence, which causes a tragic outcome.

== Production ==
After the success of its 1978 television series Cañas y barro, Vicente Blasco Ibáñez's first novel adapted to television, Televisión Española (TVE) commissioned the same production company, Aldebarán Films, to adapt La barraca, another novel by Blasco Ibáñez. The production was done with practically the same technical crew to try to repeat the success of its predecessor. The series was filmed in ten weeks with a cost of 81 million pesetas (€486,820). The exteriors were filmed on location near the Albufera in Valencia and the interiors were filmed in Madrid.

The shack referred to in the title is a barraca, a typical building of the Valencian Community and the Region of Murcia that served as housing for farmers in irrigated farming areas.

== Cast ==
- Álvaro de Luna as Batiste
- Marisa de Leza as Teresa
- Victoria Abril as Roseta
- Juan Carlos Naya as Tonet
- Lola Herrera as Pepeta
- Luis Suárez as Pimentó
- Eduardo Fajardo as Barret
- Terele Pávez as Amparo
- Gabriel Llopart as Don Joaquín
- Fernando Hilbeck as Copa
- Adrián Ortega as Salvador
- Miguel Ayones as Doctor

== Accolades ==
=== TP de Oro ===
Year	Category	Recipient	Result	Ref.
1979	Best Spanish Series		Won	
1979	Best Actor	Álvaro de Luna	Won	
1979	Best Actress	Lola Herrera	Won	
1979	Best Actress	Marisa de Leza	2nd Place	
1979	Best Actress	Victoria Abril	3rd place	
