= Blood and Sand (1941 film) =

1941 film by Rouben Mamoulian

- Theatrical release poster
- Directed by: Rouben Mamoulian
- Screenplay by: Jo Swerling
- Based on: Blood and Sand by Vicente Blasco Ibáñez
- Produced by: Associate producer: Robert T. Kane; Producer: Darryl F. Zanuck
- Starring: Tyrone Power; Linda Darnell; Rita Hayworth; Nazimova; Anthony Quinn; J. Carrol Naish; Lynn Bari; John Carradine; Laird Cregar; Monty Banks; Vicente Gómez
- Cinematography: Ernest Palmer; Ray Rennahan
- Edited by: Robert Bischoff
- Music by: Alfred Newman; Vicente Gómez (guitarist)
- Color process: Technicolor
- Production company: 20th Century-Fox
- Distributed by: 20th Century-Fox
- Release date: May 22, 1941
- Running time: 125 minutes
- Country: United States
- Language: English
- Budget: $1,115,200
- Box office: $2,717,200

Blood and Sand is a 1941 American Technicolor film drama starring Tyrone Power, Linda Darnell, Rita Hayworth, and Nazimova. Directed by Rouben Mamoulian, it was produced by 20th Century-Fox and was based on the 1908 Spanish novel Blood and Sand (Sangre y arena) by Vicente Blasco Ibáñez. The supporting cast features Anthony Quinn, Lynn Bari, Laird Cregar, J. Carrol Naish, John Carradine, and George Reeves. Rita Hayworth's singing voice was dubbed by Gracilla Pirraga.

Other versions of Blood and Sand include a 1922 version produced by Paramount Pictures and starring Rudolph Valentino, a 1916 version filmed by Blasco Ibanez with the help of Max André, and a 1989 version starring Christopher Rydell and Sharon Stone.

Blood and Sand was the fourth and last film in which Tyrone Power and Linda Darnell worked together. The others were Day-Time Wife (1939), Brigham Young (1940), and The Mark of Zorro (1940).

== Plot ==
As a child, Juan Gallardo wanted to be a bullfighter like his dead father. Before leaving Seville for Madrid to pursue his dream of success in the bullring, he promises his aristocratic childhood sweetheart Carmen Espinosa that he will return when he is a success and marry her. Ten years later, after achieving success as a matador, Juan returns to Seville. He uses his winnings to help his impoverished family and fulfills his promise to marry Carmen. His fame and wealth grow, and he becomes Spain's most acclaimed matador. As critics heap praises upon Juan's talent, he catches the eye of sultry socialite Doña Sol at one of his bullfights.

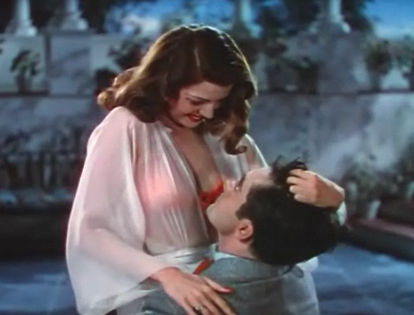
Hayworth and Power

Juan is blinded by the attention his fame has brought, and Doña Sol finds it easy to lead him astray. He soon neglects his wife, family, and training in favor of her privileged, decadent lifestyle. As a result, his performance in the bullring suffers. Not only does he fall from position as the premier matador of Spain, but also his extravagant lifestyle loses his savings, suppliers, and employees. His manager warns Juan that he is headed for destruction, but Juan refuses his advice. With falling fame and finances, rejection by everyone once important to him comes. Even Carmen leaves him, while Doña Sol moves on to new up-and-coming matador Manolo de Palma, one of Juan's childhood friends.

After losing everything, a repentant Juan begs forgiveness and is taken back by Carmen. He promises her to leave bullfighting, but wishes to have one final bullfight to prove he is still a great matador. His prayers for one last success, however, are not answered, and like his father before him, he is gored by the bull. Juan dies in the arms of Carmen as the crowd cheers Manolo's victory over the bull. Manolo bows to the fickle crowd near the stain left in the sand by Juan's blood.

== Cast ==
Tyrone Power as Juan	Linda Darnell as Carmen Espinosa
Rita Hayworth as Doña Sol	Nazimova as Señora Augustias
Anthony Quinn as Manolo de Palma	J. Carrol Naish as Garabato
Lynn Bari as Encarnación	John Carradine as Nacional
Laird Cregar as Natalio Curro	

Actor	Role
William Montague	Antonio López
Vicente Gómez	Guitarist
George Reeves	Captain Pierre Lauren
Pedro de Cordoba	Don José Álvarez
Fortunio Bonanova	Pedro Espinosa
Victor Kilian	Priest
Michael Morris	La Pulga
Charles Stevens	Pablo Gómez
Ann Todd	Carmen (as a child)
Cora Sue Collins	Encarnación (as a child)
Russell Hicks	Marquis
Maurice Cass	El Milquetoast
Rex Downing	Juan (as a child)
John Wallace	Francisco
Jacqueline Dalya	Gachi
Cullen Johnson	Manolo (as a child)
Larry Harris	Pablo (as a child)
Ted Frye	La Pulga (as a child)
Schuyler Standish	Nacional (as a child)

Uncredited (in order of appearance)
Fred Malatesta	waiter serving Natalio Curro
Michael Visaroff	patron at cantina
Rafael Alcayde	patron at cantina
Elena Verdugo	specialty dancer at cantina
Francis McDonald	Manolo's friend
Esther Estrella	girl who gazes admiringly at Juan
Cecilia Callejo	girl who gazes admiringly at Juan
Barry Norton	guest at Doña Sol's dinner and reception
Bess Flowers	guest at Doña Sol's dinner and reception
Kay Linaker	guest at Doña Sol's dinner and reception
Julian Rivero	spectator at bullfight
Gino Corrado	waiter who serves Juan at cantina

== Production ==
"Blood and Sand, more than anything else, is about color. Of all Mamoulian's films, it is the most painterly, the most pictorial." —Film historian Marc Spergel in Reinventing Reality: The Art and Life of Rouben Mamoulian (1993).

Over 30 actresses were considered for the role of Doña Sol, including Gene Tierney, Ann Sheridan and Dorothy Lamour. After Carole Landis, Zanuck's original choice, refused to dye her hair red for the role, Rita Hayworth was cast. Rouben Mamoulian's sets were inspired by the works of painters El Greco, Goya, and Velázquez. During shooting, he carried paint spray guns so he could alter the color of props at a moment's notice. He also painted shadows onto walls rather than changing the lighting.

The film's exterior long shots were filmed in Mexico City Plaza de Toros. Famous bullfighter Armillita instructed Power and other cast members and doubled as Power in some of the bullfighting sequences shot on location. Tailor Jose Dolores Perez copied two of Armillita's elaborate matador suits for the film.

Oscar "Budd" Boetticher Jr. served as a technical advisor. This was his first film. He also worked with Power on bullfighting techniques and helped dance director Geneva Sawyer to choreograph the dance between Hayworth and Anthony Quinn.

Rita Hayworth's singing voice was dubbed by Graciela Párraga.

Unlike most films at the time, Blood and Sand was not previewed, but premiered uncut at Grauman's Chinese Theatre in May 1941.

A Lux Radio Theatre version of the story, starring Power and his then-wife Annabella as Carmen, was broadcast on October 20, 1941.

== Reception ==
The film was a big hit and earned a profit of $662,500.

Variety praised the picture, adding: "Especially effective are the bullfight arena sequences...Power delivers a persuasive performance as Ibanez's hero, while Darnell is pretty and naive as the young wife. Hayworth is excellent as the vamp and catches major attention on a par with Nazimova, who gives a corking performance as Power's mother."

Conversely, The New York Times' review (signed T.S.) was very negative: "For there is too little drama, too little blood and sand, in it. Instead the story constantly bogs down in the most atrocious romantic cliches... (There are) glimpses of a stunning romantic melodrama with somber overtones. But most of the essential cruelty of the theme is lost in pretty colors and rhetorical speeches...The better performances come in the lesser roles—Laird Cregar as an effeminate aficionado, J. Carrol Naish as a broken matador, John Carradine as a grumbling member of the quadrilla. For one enthralling moment Vicente Gómez, the musician, appears on the screen. If the film had only caught the barbaric pulse of Gómez's incomparable fingers at the guitar, there would be good cause for cheers. Instead, it has been content for the most part to posture beautifully...".

== Retrospective appraisal ==
Leonard Maltin gives the film three out of four stars, describing it as a "Pastel remake of Valentino's silent film about naive bullfighter who ignores true love (Darnell) for temptress (Hayworth). Slow-paced romance uplifted by Nazimova's knowing performance as Power's mother; beautiful color production earned cinematographers Ernest Palmer and Ray Rennahan Oscars."

== On the influence of Spanish painters ==
After completing his musical High, Wide and Handsome (1937), Mamoulian traveled to Europe to view its art and architecture. While in Paris, he saw an El Greco exhibit, which would inform his chapel sequence in Blood and Sand. Mamoulian, an amateur painter, reported in a June 1941 interview with American Cinematographer that his sequences in Blood and Sand had been explicitly styled after the Spanish masters, among them Murillo, Goya, Velazquez, and El Greco.

== Imitations ==
- In the same year, 1941, Mexican comedian Cantinflas appeared in the Mexican comedy film Neither Blood nor Sand (Ni sangre, ni arena) a deliberate parody of this picture.
- Inspired by Blood and Sands popularity, the Three Stooges released a short titled What's the Matador? with no story connection except bullfighting. It was filmed in August 1941, three months after Blood and Sand was released, but did not come out until April 1942.
- Fear and Sand, an Italian comedy film of 1948 starring Totò as a hapless bullfighter, plays only with the title.

== Awards ==
The film won an Academy Award for Best Cinematography. It also was nominated for Best Art Direction (Richard Day, Joseph C. Wright and Thomas Little).

== See also ==
- Blood and Sand (1916 film)
- Blood and Sand (1922 film)
- Blood and Sand (1989 film)
