= Blood and Sand (novel) =

1908 novel by Vicente Blasco Ibáñez

- Author: Vicente Blasco Ibáñez
- Original title: Sangre y arena
- Language: Spanish
- Publication date: 1908
- Publication place: Spain
- Pages: 410

Blood and Sand (Spanish: Sangre y arena) is a 1908 novel by the Spanish writer Vicente Blasco Ibáñez.

== Plot ==
Set in the world of Spanish bullfighting, the novel follows Juan Gallardo, a successful bullfighter who has made his way out of poverty. His life changes for the worse when he takes a mistress and is discovered by his wife. When the wife leaves him, he loses the will to continue bullfighting. His wife eventually convinces him to take part in one last bullfighting event, in which he is severely injured.

== Themes ==
The novel is written in a realist mode and emphasises the psychology of its characters. It was intended as an attack on bullfighting as an institution. It portrays the cheering crowd as the true villain of the story. The main character was inspired by Manuel "El Espartero" García Cuesta, a popular bullfighter who died from injuries in the arena in 1894.

== Reception ==
The novel was a major popular success and made Blasco Ibáñez famous. It contributed to creating an international image about Spain and Spanish bullfighting.

== Adaptations ==
The novel has been the basis for the following adaptations.

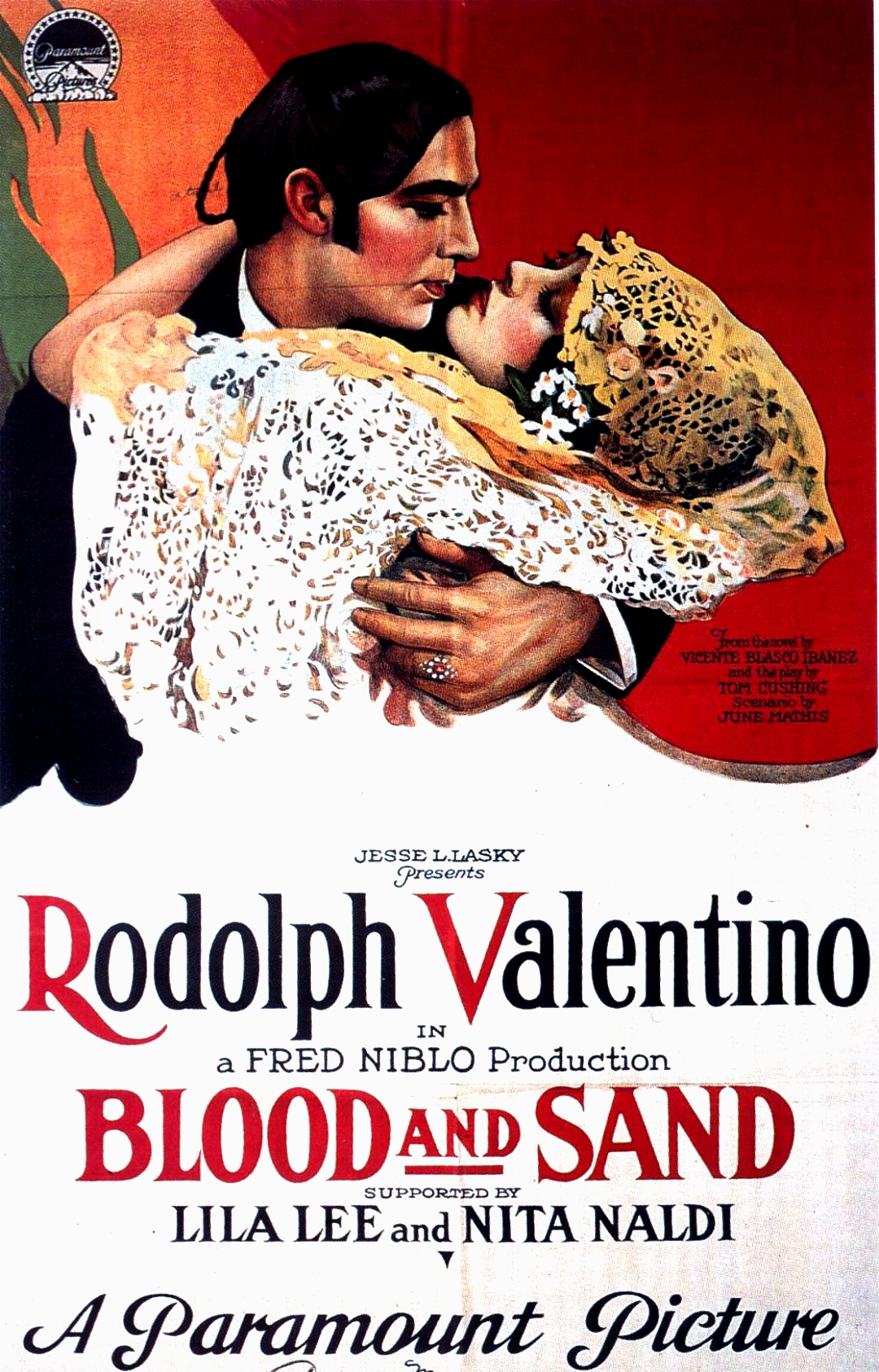
Poster for the 1922 film

- Blood and Sand, 1916 Spanish film directed by Ibáñez himself
- Blood and Sand, 1921 play by Tom Cushing
- Blood and Sand, 1922 American film starring Rudolph Valentino, Lila Lee and Nita Naldi, also based on Cushing's play
- Blood and Sand, 1941 American film directed by Rouben Mamoulian, starring Tyrone Power, Linda Darnell and Rita Hayworth
- Sangue e Areia, 1967–1968 Brazilian telenovela starring Tarcísio Meira, Glória Menezes and Theresa Amayo
- Blood and Sand, 1989 Spanish film starring Christopher Rydell, Sharon Stone and Ana Torrent

Blood and Sand and the 1941 Hollywood adaptation are parodied in the 1948 Italian film Fear and Sand starring Totò.
