= Blood and Sand (1916 film) =

1916 film by Vicente Blasco Ibañez

Blood and Sand (Spanish: Sangre y Arena) is a 1916 film based on the novel Blood and Sand by Vicente Blasco Ibáñez. The film was co-directed by Blasco Ibáñez himself and Max André. It was produced by the Spanish-French label Prometheus Films, named after the Editorial Prometeo, Blasco Ibáñez's publishing house, which backed the cost of the film.

It was the first time that the novelist assumed management tasks and production. Moreover, thanks to the success achieved in Spain, Sangre y Arena exerted a significant influence on the Spanish cinema in the immediate years, and stood at the origins and then used as appellant españolada genre. It was the only time that Blasco Ibáñez himself reflected in images the design of his own work.

It remains a tape from the Czech Film Archive, a version with 800 meters of length less than the original film. This version was restored by the Valencia Film Archive and Prague's, with a changed ending, where the parallels between bullfighting and bandits are reinforced.

== Restoration ==
The copy held by Valencia Film Archive was given by Dolores Nebot Sanchis in 1993. It was a film roll in nitrate support found in a state of decay that produced irreversible damage to the image, and contained about a sixth part of the full footage. From that footage, restored in 1993, 93 meters were saved.

In 1996, following a projection by the Spanish Film Archive of a series of films archived at the Czech Film Archive, the Valencia Film Archive contacted with Národní Filmový Archiv and got on loan their copy so they could complete the nitrate footage as close as possible to the original length.

That copy was repaired with nitrate material from diverse origin, with fingerprint and loss of emulsion problems. It was restored in the ISKRA lab and the security transfer used an optical printer with wet window.

From the Valencia Film Archive footage were extended some sequences that were shorter in the Czech copy. Also, some sequences were completed and others added, sequenced according to the order of the original novel.

== See also ==
- Blood and Sand (1922 film)
- Blood and Sand (1941 film)
- Blood and Sand (1989 film)

== Bibliography ==
- Bosch, Isabel; Lahoz, Ignacio (1999). "Sangre y Arena". Collecció Imatges Rescatades (in Spanish). Valencia: Institut Valencià de l'Audiovisual i de la Cinematografia.
