= Arroz y tartana (TV series) =

Spanish television miniseries (2003)

- Genre: Historical drama
- Based on: Arroz y tartana by Vicente Blasco Ibáñez
- Screenplay by: Horacio Valcárcel
- Directed by: José Antonio Escrivá
- Composer: Enric Murillo
- Country of origin: Spain
- Original language: Spanish
- No. of seasons: 1
- No. of episodes: 2

Production
- Cinematography: Julio Madurga
- Running time: 120 min.
- Production companies: Televisión Española; Generalitat Valenciana
- Budget: €2.4 million

Original release
- Network: La Primera
- Release: 19 November 2003

Arroz y tartana (transl. Rice and cart) is a Spanish prime-time television miniseries based on the 1894 novel of the same name by Vicente Blasco Ibáñez. Produced by Intercartel for Televisión Española (TVE) and Generalitat Valenciana, it was directed by José Antonio Escrivá, with screenplay by Horacio Valcárcel. Its two episodes adapting the novel were broadcast on La Primera of Televisión Española on 19 November 2003.

== Plot ==
In Valencia around 1900, Doña Manuela de Fora, widow twice, lives with the obsession of marrying the two daughters from her second marriage, Concha and Amparo. She is really bankrupt because of her habit of spending money to pretend that she still has the position she once had. She despises the son of her first marriage, Juanito, because he wants to be a merchant like his father and because he is in love with a humble seamstress.

== Production ==
The miniseries was produced by Intercartel for Televisión Española (TVE) and was partially financed by the Generalitat Valenciana. It was filmed in forty days in Valencia and Xàtiva with a budget of €2.4 million.

The two episodes premiered on La Primera of Televisión Española on 19 November 2003, and had an audience of 4,456,000 viewers in average, which represented a 31.5% share.

== Cast ==
- Carmen Maura as Doña Manuela de Fora
- José Sancho as Juan
- Eloy Azorín as Juanito
- Blanca Jara as Concha
- Gretel Stuyck as Amparo

== Accolades ==
=== Monte-Carlo Television Festival ===
Year	Category	Recipient	Result	Ref.
2004	Golden Nymph Award for Best actress	Carmen Maura	Won	

=== ATV Awards ===
Year	Category	Recipient	Result	Ref.
2003	Best TV movie		Won	
2003	Best direction	José Antonio Escrivá	Nominated	
2003	Best production		Nominated	
2003	Best cinematography	Julio Madurga	Nominated	
