= Blood and Sand (1989 film) =

- Theatrical release poster
- Directed by: Javier Elorrieta
- Written by: Rafael Azcona; Ricardo Franco; Thomas A. Fucci
- Based on: Blood and Sand; 1908 novel by Vicente Blasco Ibáñez
- Produced by: José Frade
- Starring: Christopher Rydell; Sharon Stone; Ana Torrent
- Cinematography: Toño Ríos
- Edited by: José Antonio Rojo
- Music by: Jesús Gluck; Paco de Lucía (uncredited)
- Production company: José Frade Producciones Cinematográficas S.A.
- Distributed by: 20th Century Fox
- Release dates: September 22, 1989 (Portugal); September 28, 1989 (Spain)
- Running time: 113 minutes
- Countries: United States; Spain
- Language: English

Blood and Sand (Spanish: Sangre y arena) is a 1989 Spanish drama film directed by Javier Elorrieta and starring Christopher Rydell, Sharon Stone, and Ana Torrent. It was loosely based on the novel Blood and Sand by Vicente Blasco Ibáñez, which had been adapted for the screen three times before, in 1916, 1922 and 1941.

== Plot ==
Torero Juan Gallardo (Christopher Rydell), wanting to be popular in bullfighting, takes the cousin of his love Carmen (Ana Torrent) with him for a bullfighting competition. There they successfully learn some skills in the arena, but when the bull charges Juan, his friend saves Gallardo at the cost of his own life.

Juan meets a beautiful rich woman named Doña Sol (Sharon Stone), the daughter of a wealthy landowner, who offers Juan an opportunity to join her company as a hired hand. Juan declines to pursue his dream of superstardom as a bullfighter. A security guard directs him to a bullfighting trainer named Nacional (Albert Vidal) who trains Juan. Garabato (Guillermo Montesinos) joins Juan at a national bullfighting competition, and the skill Juan displays in his first national league appearance makes him popular.

Juan marries Carmen, increasing his popularity, but soon develops a crush on Doña Sol. Juan asks her to marry him but she rejects him. When Carmen confronts Doña Sol about Juan, she reveals where Juan is hiding and he goes to a midnight bar to get drunk. When Nacional advises Juan to focus instead on the next day's competition, he assaults Nacional who leaves angrily. Juan and Doña Sol then go to a popular city hotel, where Juan's rival, Pepe Serrano makes advances on Doña Sol. Juan punches Serrano and insults Doña Sol who leaves with Serrano. Juan, still drunk, visits the office of his manager Don Jose accompanied by two prostitutes where Nacional admonishes him. Juan assaults Nacional who abandons Juan's training. Juan phones Carmen to apologize, but she rejects his apology.

During the bullfight Juan fails to control the bull. Carmen and Juan's mother pray for him, while Juan's brother-in-law Antonio pushes Carmen to go forgive Juan and assist him. Nacional sees her enter the stands and runs to tell Juan she's come to watch. Juan his cap to Carmen as an apology and gives an outstanding performance, but is gored just before the finale and thrown to the ground by the bull. Carmen and Nacional follow Juan to the hospital, where he dies from trauma and blood loss. Carmen and Nacional walk away weeping.

Back in the arena, Serrano defeats the bull and wins the competition.

== Cast ==
- Christopher Rydell as Juan Gallardo
- Ana Torrent as Carmen
- Sharon Stone as Lady Doña Sol
- Albert Vidal as Nacional
- Tony Fuentes as Pepe Serrano
- Guillermo Montesinos as Garabato
- Simón Andreu as Antonio
- José Luis de Vilallonga as Don José
