= Blood and Sand (1922 film) =

1922 film by Fred Niblo

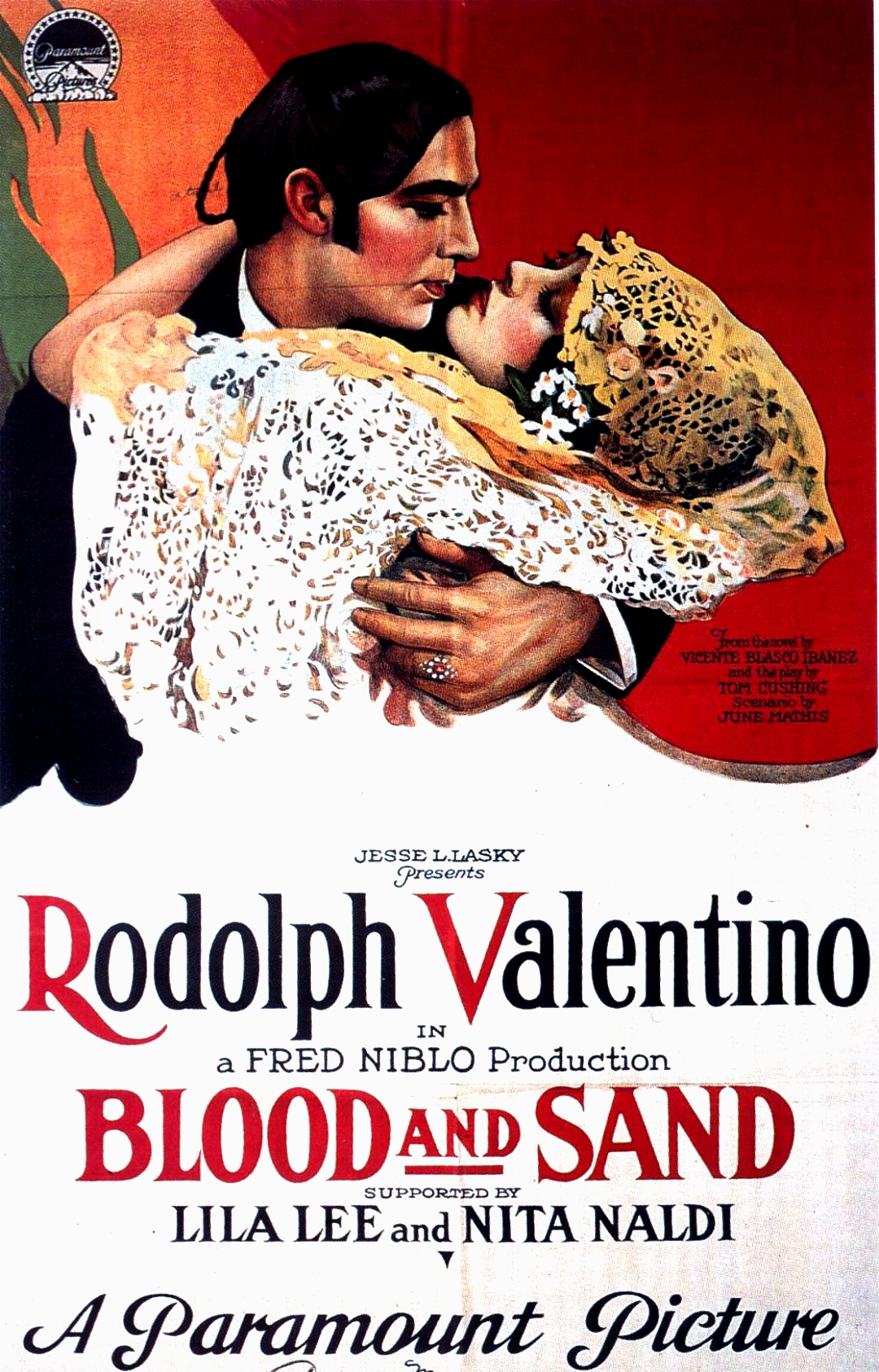
- Theatrical release poster
- Directed by: Fred Niblo
- Screenplay by: June Mathis
- Based on: Blood and Sand; 1908 novel by Vicente Blasco Ibanez; Blood and Sand; 1921 play by Thomas Cushing
- Produced by: Fred Niblo (uncredited); Jesse L. Lasky
- Starring: Rudolph Valentino; Lila Lee; Nita Naldi; Rosa Rosanova; Walter Long
- Cinematography: Alvin Wyckoff
- Edited by: Dorothy Arzner (uncredited)
- Production company: Famous Players–Lasky Paramount Pictures
- Distributed by: Paramount Pictures
- Release date: August 5, 1922 (United States)
- Running time: 80 minutes 9 reels (8,110 feet or 2,471 meters)
- Country: United States
- Languages: Silent; English intertitles
- Box office: $1,250,000 (US/Canada)

Blood and Sand

Blood and Sand is a 1922 American silent drama film produced by Paramount Pictures, directed by Fred Niblo and starring Rudolph Valentino, Lila Lee, and Nita Naldi. It was based on the 1908 Spanish novel Blood and Sand (Sangre y arena) by Vicente Blasco Ibáñez and the play Blood and Sand by Thomas Cushing which was adapted from Ibáñez's novel.

== Plot ==
Juan Gallardo, a village boy born into poverty, grows up to become one of the greatest matadors in Spain. He marries a friend from his childhood, the beautiful and virtuous Carmen, but after he achieves fame and fortune he finds himself drawn to Doña Sol, a wealthy, seductive widow.

They embark on a torrid affair with sadomasochistic overtones, but Juan, feeling guilty over his betrayal of Carmen, tries to free himself of Doña Sol. Furious at being rejected, she exposes their affair to Carmen and Juan's mother, seemingly destroying his marriage. Growing more and more miserable and dissipated, Juan becomes reckless in the arena. He is eventually killed in a bullfight but does manage to reconcile with Carmen moments before he dies.

There is also a subplot involving a local outlaw whose career is paralleled to Juan's throughout the film by the village philosopher: Juan's fatal injury in the bullring comes moments after the outlaw is shot by the police.

Intertitles in the film forthrightly declare bullfighting to be brutal and cruel.

== Cast ==
- Rosa Rosanova as Angustias
- Leo White as Antonio
- Rosita Marstini as Encarnacion
- Rudolph Valentino as Juan Gallardo (billed Rodolph Valentino)
- Lila Lee as Carmen
- Charles Belcher as Don Joselito
- Fred Becker as Don Jose
- George Field as El Nacional
- Jack Winn as Potaje
- Harry Lamont as Puntillero
- Gilbert Clayton as Garabato
- Walter Long as Plumitas
- Nita Naldi as Doña Sol
- George Periolat as Marquis of Guevera
- Sidney De Gray as Dr. Ruiz
- Dorcas Matthews

== Production notes ==
The film was produced by Famous Players–Lasky Corporation and Paramount Pictures, and distributed by Paramount. June Mathis, who has been credited as discovering Valentino, adapted the novel for the screen.

Dorothy Arzner worked as the film's editor. Arzner, who would later become one of the first female film directors, used stock footage of bullfights filmed in Madrid interspersed with close-ups of Valentino. Her work on the film helped to solidify her reputation of being a resourceful editor as her techniques also saved Paramount money. She would later say that working on the film was the "first waymark to my claim to a little recognition as an individual."

== Reception ==
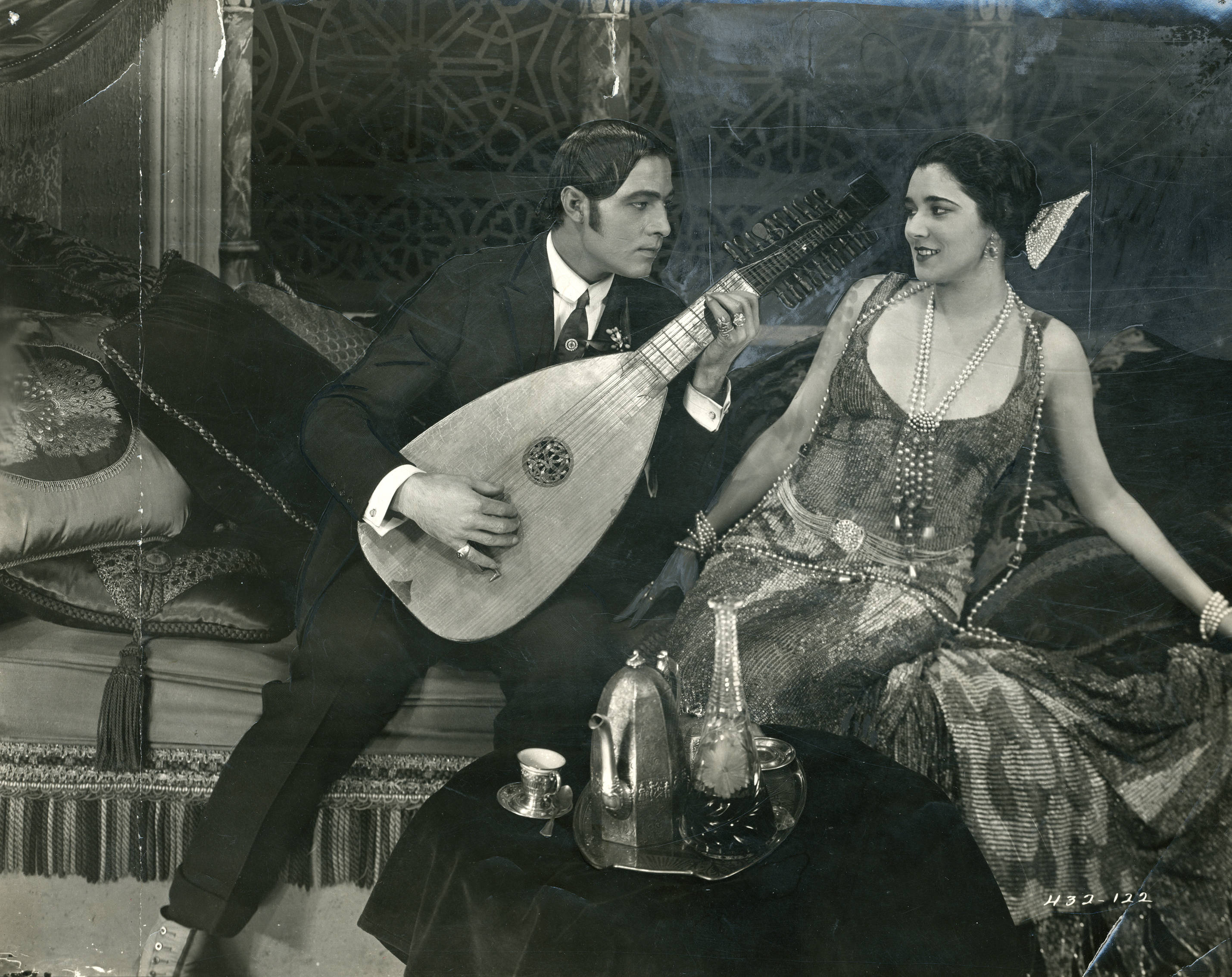
Film still of Valentino and Naldi in Blood and Sand

Blood and Sand premiered at the Rialto Theater in Los Angeles on August 22, 1922. The film was a box office hit and was one of the top-grossing films of 1922. The film, along with The Sheik and Four Horsemen of the Apocalypse (both 1921), helped to establish Valentino as a star and was one of the most successful films of his career. "In my judgement it is the best thing he has done," said Mary Pickford of Valentino's performance, "and one of Mr. Niblo's finest pictures. It is one of the few pictures I have been able to sit through twice and enjoy the second time more than the first."

In August 1922, Cal York (pseudonym, for California and New York) of Photoplay commented on the actor's appearance in the above film still: "...is Rodolph Valentino wearing a wig in 'Blood and Sand,' or did he permit his slick hair to be coiffed into the curly mop you see under this Spanish cap? Cheer up—it's only temporary. Later on in the picture he looks more like Julio." By "Julio", York is referring to Valentino's character in The Four Horsemen of the Apocalypse, who has slicked-back hair.

== Other adaptations ==
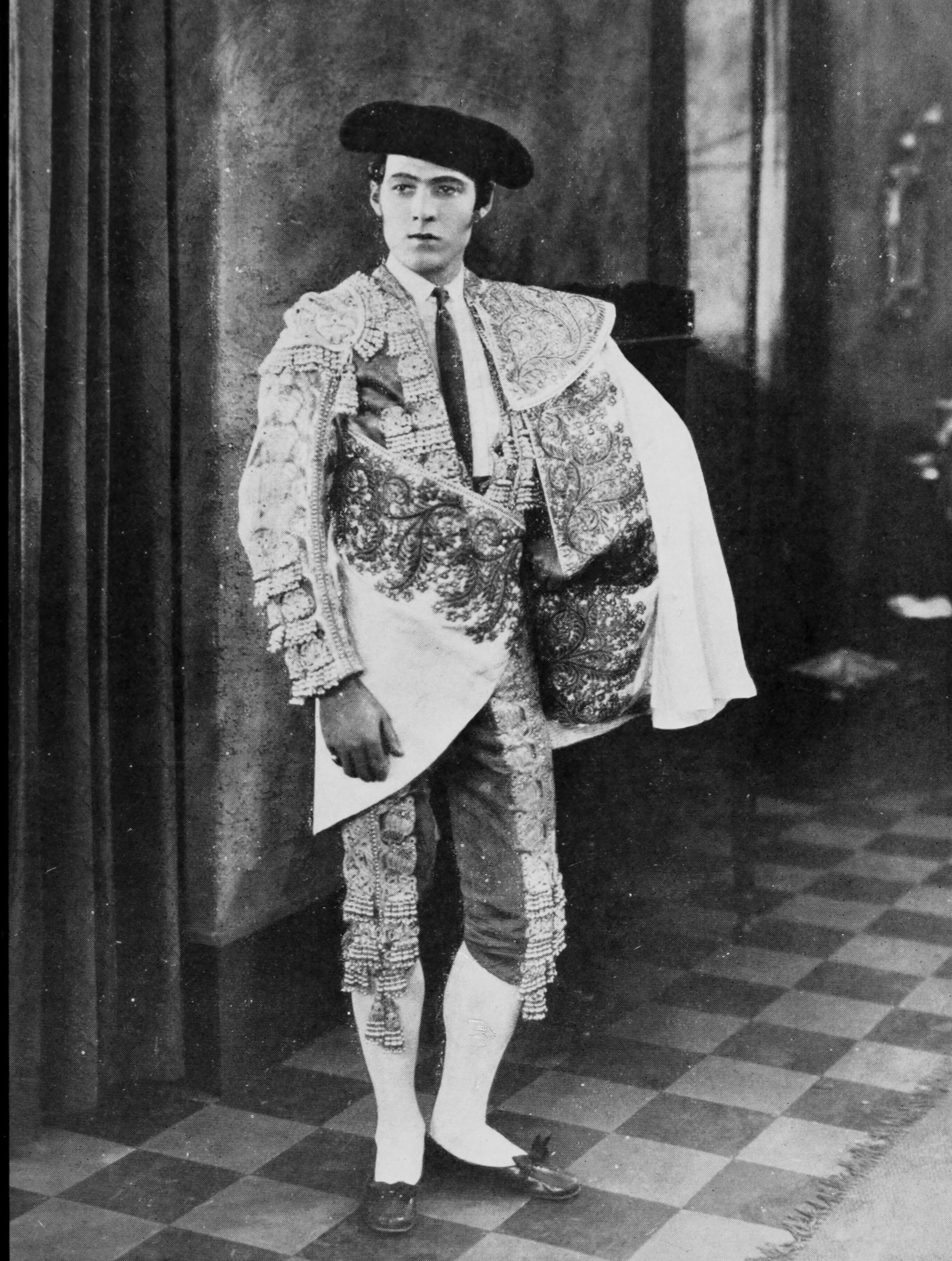
Valentino as Juan Gallardo

An earlier version of Blood and Sand was released in 1916, and filmed by Blasco Ibáñez himself, with the help of Max André. This earlier version was restored in 1998 by the Filmoteca de la Generalitat Valenciana (Spain).

Blood and Sand has also been remade twice; a 1941 version was directed by Rouben Mamoulian and stars Tyrone Power, Linda Darnell, and Rita Hayworth. The 1989 Spanish remake was directed by Javier Elorrieta and stars Chris Rydell, Sharon Stone, and Ana Torrent.

== In popular culture ==
The film was the source of legendary football player Johnny Blood's nickname - he started playing professional under an alias to protect his remaining college eligibility. He and a friend passed a theater where Blood and Sand was playing. Suddenly, McNally exclaimed to his friend, "That's it! You be Sand. I'll be Blood".

Blood and Sand was parodied by Stan Laurel in Mud and Sand (1922). In the film, Laurel portrays a character named Rhubarb Vaselino. Will Rogers also parodied Blood and Sand in the Hal Roach short film Big Moments From Little Pictures (1924).

The film gave its name to a popular Prohibition-era cocktail, the Blood and Sand.
