= Vicente Blasco Ibáñez =

Spanish journalist, politician, and novelist (1867–1928)

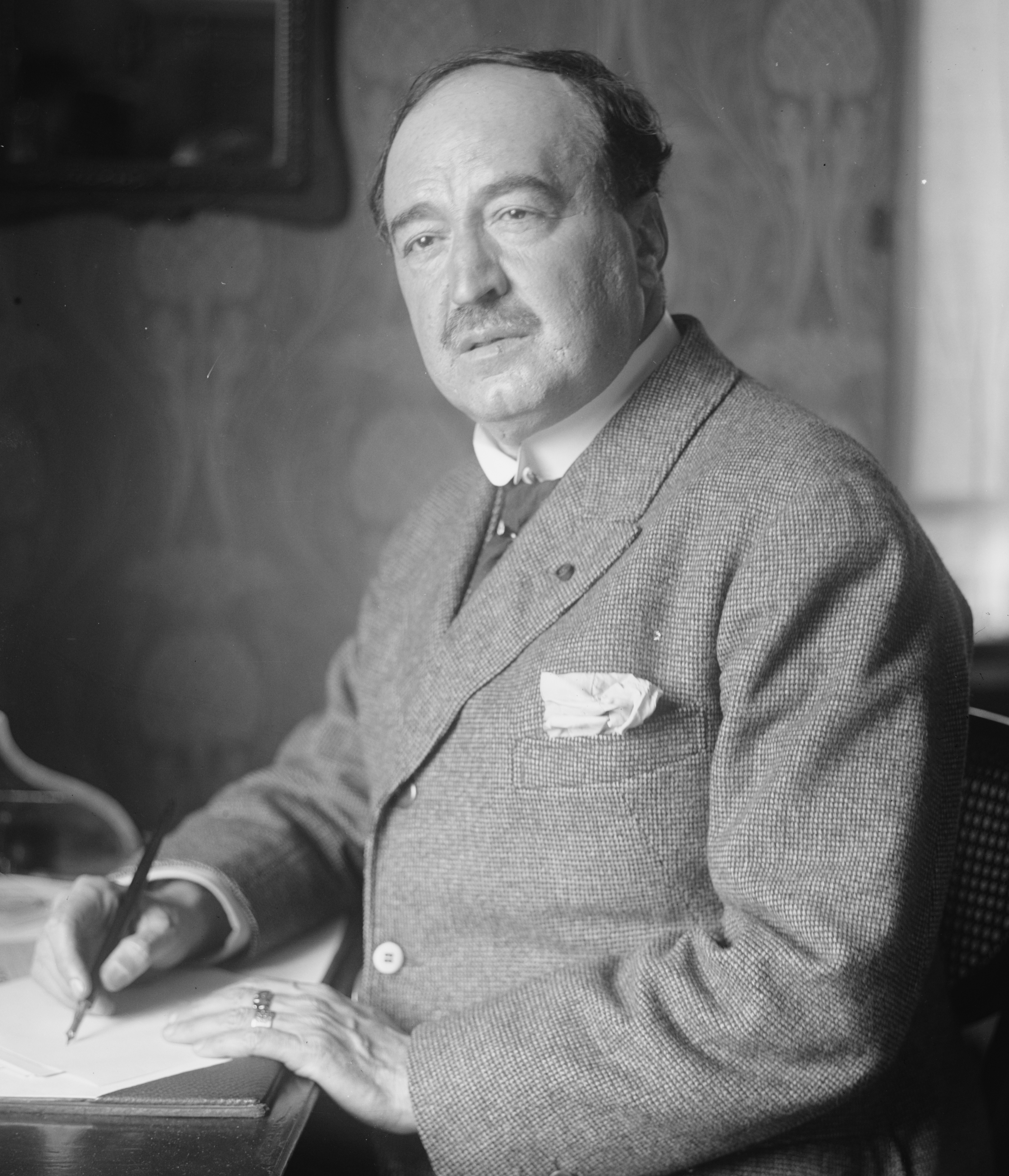
- Blasco Ibáñez in 1919
- Born: Vicente Blasco Ibáñez; 29 January 1867; Valencia, Spain
- Died: 28 January 1928 (aged 60); Menton, France
- Resting place: Valencia Cemetery
- Writing career
- Language: Spanish
- Literary movement: Realism

Vicente Blasco Ibáñez (Spanish pronunciation: [biˈθente ˈβlaskojˈβaɲeθ], 29 January 1867 – 28 January 1928) was a journalist, politician, and a bestselling Spanish novelist in various genres whose most widespread and lasting fame in the English-speaking world is from Hollywood films that were adapted from his works.

== Biography ==
He was born in Valencia. At university, he studied law and graduated in 1888 but never went into practice since he was more interested in politics, journalism, and literature. He was a particular fan of Miguel de Cervantes.

In politics, he was a militant Republican partisan in his youth, and he founded the newspaper El Pueblo (translated as The People) in his hometown, in which he developed a Republican populist political movement known as Blasquismo. The newspaper aroused so much controversy that it was taken to court many times. In 1896, he was arrested and sentenced to a few months in prison. He made many enemies. He was shot, and almost killed, in one dispute; the bullet was caught in the clasp of his belt. He had several stormy love affairs.

He volunteered as the proofreader for the novel Noli Me Tángere in which the Filipino patriot José Rizal expressed his contempt for the Spanish colonization of the Philippines.

He traveled to Argentina in 1909 where two new settlements, Nueva Valencia, and Cervantes, were created. He gave conferences on historical events and Spanish literature. Tired and disgusted with government failures and inaction, he moved to Paris at the beginning of the First World War. Living in Paris, he had been introduced to the poet and writer Robert W. Service by their mutual publisher Fisher Unwin, who asked Service to act as an interpreter for a contract concerning Ibáñez.

He was a supporter of the Allies during the First World War.

He died in 1928 in Menton, France, the day before his 61st birthday, at Fontana Rosa (also called the House of Writers), the house he had built and dedicated to Miguel de Cervantes, Charles Dickens and Honoré de Balzac.

He had expressed his desire that his body would return to Valencia when Spain became a republic. In October 1933, his remains were carried by the Spanish battleship Jaime I to Valencia where authorities of the Second Spanish Republic received it. After several days of public homage, the coffin was deposited in a niche in the civil cemetery of Valencia. A mausoleum by Mariano Benlliure remained unfinished and was deposited in the Museum of Fine Arts in 1940. It was relocated to the Centre del Carme in 1988 and, in 2017, back to the museum. It is planned that the mausoleum will be finished in 2021 and Blasco's remains stored in it.

== Writing career ==
His first published novel was La araña negra ("The Black Spider") in 1892. The immature work that he later repudiated was a study of the connections between a noble Spanish family and the Jesuits throughout the 19th century. It seems to have been a vehicle for him to express his anticlerical views.

In 1894, he published his first mature work, the novel Arroz y tartana (Airs and Graces). The story is about a widow in late-19th-century Valencia trying to keep up appearances to marry her daughters well. His next books consist of detailed studies of aspects of rural life in the farmlands of Valencia, the so-called huerta that the Moorish colonizers had created to grow crops such as rice, vegetables and oranges, with a carefully planned irrigation system in an otherwise arid landscape. The concern with depicting the details of this lifestyle qualifies what he called an example of costumbrismo:

- Flor de mayo (1895) ('Mayflower')
- La barraca (1898) ('The Hut')
- Entre naranjos (1900) ('Between Orange Trees')
- Cañas y barro (1902) ('Reeds and Mud')

The works also show the influence of naturalism, which he would most likely have assimilated through reading Émile Zola. The characters in the works are determined by the interaction of heredity, environment, and social conditions (race, milieu et moment), and the novelist is acting as a kind of scientist drawing out the influences that act upon them at any given moment. They are powerful works but are sometimes flawed by heavy-handed didactic elements. For example, in La Barraca, the narrator often preaches the need for these ignorant people to be better educated. There is also a strong political element as he shows how destructive it is for the poor farmworkers to be fighting one another rather than uniting against their true oppressors – the church and the landowners. However, along the preaching are lyrical and highly detailed accounts of how the irrigation canals are managed and of the workings of the age-old "tribunal de las aguas", a court composed of farmers that meets weekly near Valencia Cathedral to decide which farm gets to receive water and when and arbitrates on disputes on access to water. Cañas y barro is often adjudged the masterpiece of that phase of Blasco Ibáñez's writings.

After that, his writing changed markedly. He left behind costumbrismo and Naturalism and began to set his novels in more cosmopolitan locations than the huerta of Valencia. His plots became more sensational and melodramatic. Academic criticism of him in the English-speaking world has largely ignored those works, but they form by far the majority of his published output: some 30 works. Some of these works attracted the attention of Hollywood studios and became the basis of celebrated films.

Prominently, Sangre y arena (Blood and Sand, 1908), which follows the career of Juan Gallardo from his poor beginnings as a child in Seville to his rise to celebrity as a matador in Madrid, where he falls under the spell of the seductive Doña Sol, which leads to his downfall. Ibáñez directed a 65 min film version in 1916. There were three remakes in 1922, 1941 and 1989.

His greatest personal success probably came from the novel The Four Horsemen of the Apocalypse (1916), which tells a tangled tale of the French and German sons-in-law of an Argentinian landowner who find themselves fighting on opposite sides during the First World War. When it was filmed by Rex Ingram in 1921, it became the vehicle that propelled Rudolph Valentino to stardom.

Rex Ingram also filmed Mare Nostrum, a spy story from 1918 that was filmed in 1926 as a vehicle for his wife Alice Terry at his MGM studio in Nice. Michael Powell claimed in his memoirs that he had his first experience of working in films on that production.

A further two Hollywood films can be singled out, as they were the first films that were made by Greta Garbo following her arrival at MGM in Hollywood: The Torrent (based on Entre naranjos from 1900) and The Temptress (derived from La Tierra de Todos from 1922).

== Works ==
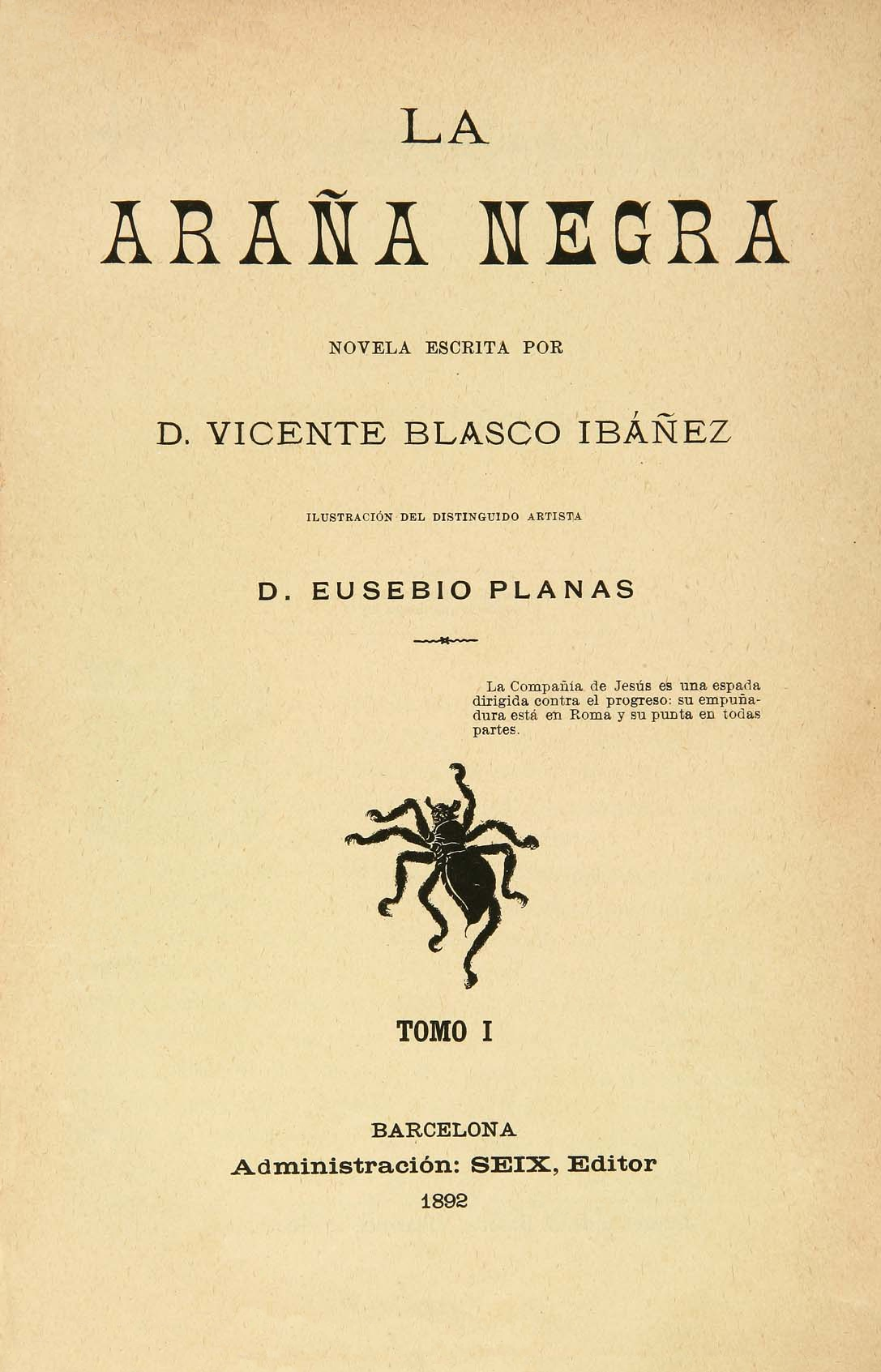
"La araña negra" (1892) volume I.

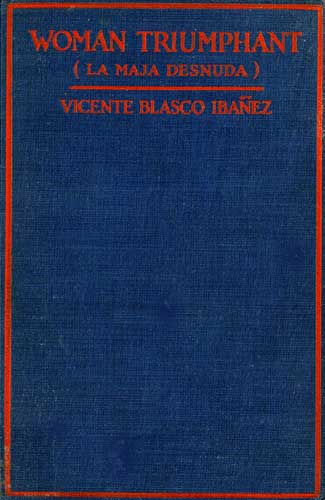
Woman Triumphant, a translation of La maja desnuda by Vicente Blasco Ibáñez into English

- La araña negra (1892)
- Arroz y tartana (1894)
- Flor de mayo (1895)
- Cuentos valencianos (1896)
- La barraca (1898). English translation: The Shack.
- Entre naranjos (1900), another Valencian piece.
- Cañas y barro (1902), about life among the fishermen-peasants of the Albufera marshes in Valencia. English translation: Reeds and Mud.
- El establo de Eva (1902), short story.
- El parásito del tren (1902), short story.
- La catedral (1903)
- El intruso (1904), about immigration to the Basque Country.
- La bodega (1905)
- La horda (1905)
- Novísima geografia universal (translation) by Onesime and Elisé Reclus, 6 volumes (1906)
- La maja desnuda (1906), novel with title inspired by Goya's painting The Nude Maja. English translation: Woman Triumphant.
- Oriente (1907)
- Voluntad de vivir (1907, published in 1953)
- Sangre y arena (1908), is about a matador in a love triangle. English translation: Blood and Sand.
- Los muertos mandan (1909)
- Luna Benamor (1909)
- Argentina y sus grandezas (1910)
- Los argonautas (1914)
- Los cuatro jinetes del Apocalipsis (1916), about Argentina and the First World War. English translation: The Four Horsemen of the Apocalypse.
- Mare Nostrum (1918), a spy novel in the Mediterranean.
- Los enemigos de la mujer (1919). English translation: Enemies of Women.
- El préstamo de la difunta (1921)
- El paraíso de las mujeres (1922)
- La familia de Doctor Pedraza (1922)
- La tierra de todos (1922)
- La reina Calafia (1924)
- Novelas de la costa azul (1924)
- Vuelta del mundo de un novelista (1924–25), a travelogue.
- El papa del mar (1925), about the antipope Benedict XIII, who established his court at Peñíscola.
- A los pies de Venus (1926)
- El caballero de la virgen (1929)
- En busca del Gran Khan (1929)
- Fantasma de las alas de oro (1930)
- La Pared (n/a)
- Vistas sudamericanas (n/a)

=== Adaptations ===
- Sangre y arena: 1916 film, 1922 film, 1941 film and 1989 film.
- Los cuatro jinetes del Apocalipsis: 1921 film and 1962 film.
- Los enemigos de la mujer: 1923 film.
- Amor Argentino: 1924 film.
- Circe, la maga: 1924 film.
- Mare Nostrum: 1926 film and 1948 film.
- Entre naranjos: 1926 film and 1997 television series.
- La tierra de todos: 1926 film.
- La bodega: 1930 film.
- La barraca: 1945 film and 1979 television series.
- Cañas y barro: 1954 film and 1978 television series.
- Flor de mayo: 1959 film and 2008 television series.
- Arroz y tartana: 2003 television series.
