= Elizabeth Anderton =

British ballet dancer and director

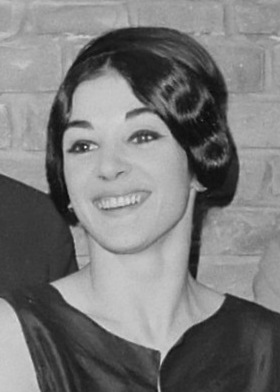
Anderton in Amsterdam in 1964

Elizabeth Anderton (born 28 May 1938) is a retired English ballet dancer and director. She danced with Sadler's Wells Opera Ballet and The Royal Ballet, and was later artistic director of the London Festival Ballet. She was awarded the Governors of The Royal Ballet Gold Medal in 2010.

== Biography ==
Anderton was born on 28 May 1938 in Paddington, London, England.

Anderton studied with Nesta Brooking and at The Royal Ballet School and at Sadler's Wells School. In 1955 she joined the Sadler's Wells Opera Ballet. From 1957 to 1974, she worked at The Royal Ballet, becoming soloist in 1958 and principal dancer in 1961.

Anderton was injured in 1970, and was inspired to teach after her rehabilitation and coaching sessions with Winifred Edwards.

In 1975, Anderton worked as a coach for the Australian Ballet. In 1977, she became involved with London Festival Ballet (now the English National Ballet), first as a teacher, répétiteur and guest dancer then later as assistant artistic director (1979–83 and 1984–90). She returned to the Royal Ballet in the 1990s.

Anderton created roles in John Cranko's Sweeney Todd (1959), Frederick Ashton's The Two Pigeons (1961), Antony Tudor's Knight Errant (1968), and Rudolf Nureyev's Romeo and Juliet (1977). She also played the Queen in the 1988 TV Movie Natalya Makarova's Swan Lake. Her repertory included Aurora, Giselle, Raymonda and Swanilda.

Anderton has also judged senior ballet competitions, including the Geoghegan Award.

Anderton was awarded the Governors of The Royal Ballet Gold Medal in 2010.
