= Madam Valentino: The Many Lives of Natacha Rambova =

1991 biography by Michael Morris

- Author: Michael Thomas Morris
- Language: English
- Subject: Natacha Rambova
- Genre: Biography
- Publisher: Abbeville Press
- Publication date: October 1, 1991
- Publication place: United States
- Awards: 272
- ISBN: 978-1-558-59136-3

Madam Valentino: The Many Lives of Natacha Rambova is a 1991 biographical book by Michael Morris that chronicles the life and career of American dancer, costume designer, and Egyptologist Natacha Rambova, best known for her association with silent film star Rudolph Valentino. The book reexamines Rambova's early work in ballet and design, her influence on Hollywood visual culture in the 1920s, her controversial marriage to Valentino, and her later reinvention as a scholar of ancient Egypt. The biography seeks to reassess Rambova's legacy and restore her place as a significant cultural figure independent of Valentino's fame.

== Synopsis ==
Born Winifred Shaughnessy in Utah, Natacha Rambova was educated abroad and adopted her professional name after joining a Russian ballet troupe in New York, led by her lover, Theodore Kosloff. She designed sets and costumes for his company before becoming the art director for Alla Nazimova.

Madam Valentino: The Many Lives of Natacha Rambova follows her early years as a classically trained dancer into her emergence as a radical creative force in silent-era cinema. It examines her work as a costume designer and art director, particularly her embrace of modernism, symbolism, and avant-garde aesthetics at a time when Hollywood favored convention. Rambova's collaborations challenged studio norms, reshaped screen imagery, and helped elevate film costume and set design into serious artistic disciplines.

Central to the narrative is her tumultuous marriage to matinée idol Rudolph Valentino, which made her one of the most controversial women in 1920s America. The book explores how studio politics, gender bias, and sensationalist media coverage cast Rambova as a domineering villain who undermined Valentino's career. Drawing on archival research, letters, and contemporary accounts, the biography dismantles these myths, revealing a complex partnership shaped by artistic ambition, power struggles, and cultural backlash.

After leaving the film industry, Rambova opened a boutique in New York before turning toward scholarship and becoming a respected authority on ancient Egyptian art and symbolism. The book traces her later decades as a scholar, writer, and intellectual expatriate, highlighting her relentless pursuit of knowledge and independence even as her earlier achievements faded from public memory.

The book reframes Rambova, not as a footnote to a famous man, but as a fiercely original modern woman—an artist, thinker, and cultural provocateur, whose life mirrored the transformations of the 20th century itself.

== Critical reception ==
Reviewing the book, Publisher Weekly wrote: "This unconventional, little-remembered, glamorous and talented spiritualist is superbly resurrected by Morris, who teaches art and religion at the Graduate Theological Union in Berkeley, Calif.

In a review for The New York Times, film historian Richard Koszarski noted that "Michael Morris, a Roman Catholic priest who teaches at the Graduate Theological Union in Berkeley, Calif., is the first to tell this familiar tale from Rambova's point of view," observing that while "the facts are the same … the perspective is very different." Koszarski wrote that Morris dismisses "three generations of bad press" about Rambova as "jealousy and misunderstanding," consistently siding with her against critics such as Valentino's manager George Ullman, and Kenneth Anger, author of Hollywood Babylon. He criticized the book for treating negative testimony about Rambova as merely "'claim' or a 'story,' while Rambova's own accounts of psychic contact with Valentino's spirit seem to be taken at face value." Although Koszarski found that Morris credited Rambova with "almost every positive move in Valentino's career," downplaying the role of others such as June Mathis, he concluded that the book's "most original material" lay in its examination of the decades following Valentino's death.
