= Natacha Rambova =

20th-century American film personality and fashion designer (1897–1966)

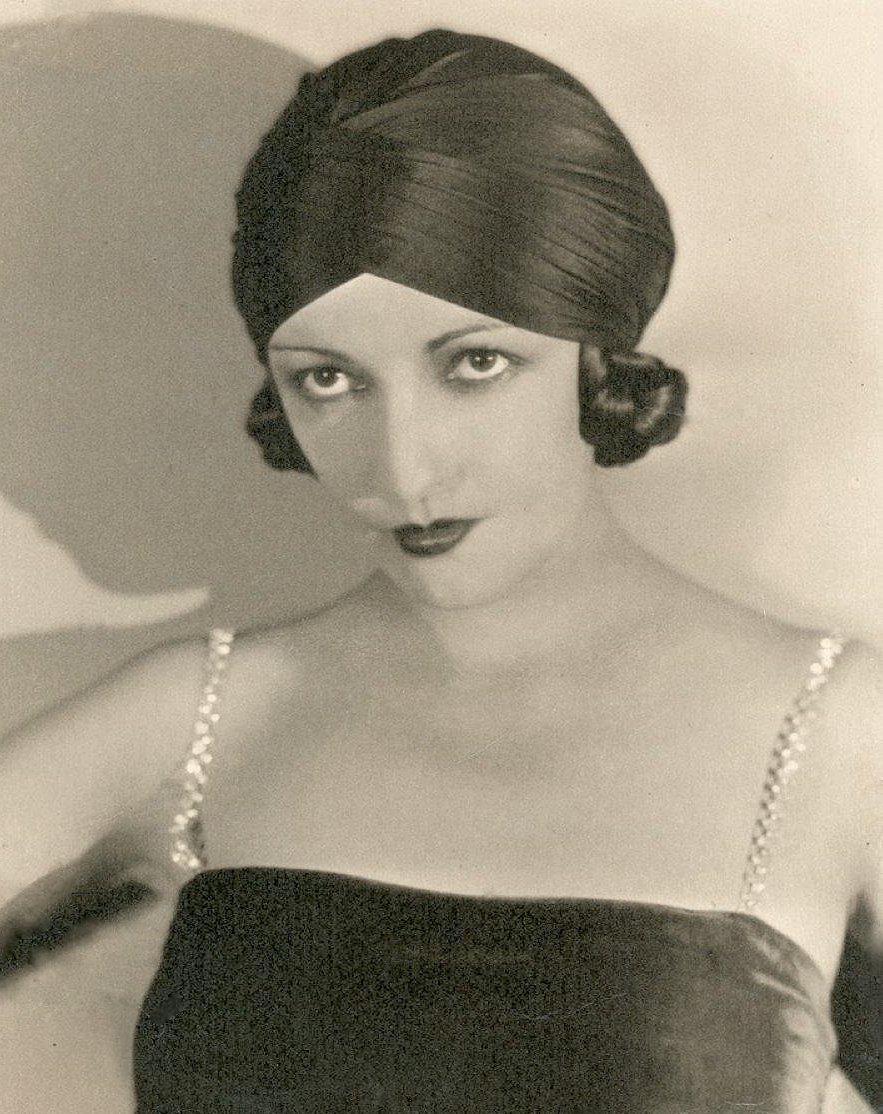
- Rambova in 1925
- Born: Winifred Kimball Shaughnessy; January 19, 1897; Salt Lake City, Utah, U.S.
- Died: June 5, 1966 (aged 69); Pasadena, California, U.S.
- Other names: Winifred de Wolfe; Winifred Hudnut; Natacha Valentino; Natacha de Urzàiz
- Occupations: Costume and set designer; dancer; actress; academic
- Spouses: Rudolph Valentino (m. 1923; div. 1926) Álvaro de Urzáiz (m. 1932; div. 1939)
- Partner: Theodore Kosloff (1915–1920)
- Relatives: Heber C. Kimball (great-grandfather)

Natacha Rambova (born Winifred Kimball Shaughnessy; January 19, 1897 – June 5, 1966) was an American dancer, costume designer, art director and Egyptologist. Rising to prominence in the early 1920s, she became one of Hollywood's first women to exert significant creative control behind the camera, particularly through her collaborations with silent film actor Rudolph Valentino, whom she married in 1923.

A trained dancer, Rambova studied under Russian ballet choreographer Theodore Kosloff in New York and performed with his Imperial Russian Ballet. After following him to Los Angeles, she began designing costumes for the stage and for his film roles before moving into set design. She gained recognition for her work with Russian actress Alla Nazimova, contributing to the productions Billions (1920), Forbidden Fruit (1921), and Camille (1921), noted for their modernist and Art Deco aesthetics. As Valentino's wife and creative partner, Rambova played a central role in shaping his screen image, serving as costume designer, art director, and consultant on several of his films, including The Young Rajah (1922), Monsieur Beaucaire (1924), and A Sainted Devil (1924). Her emphasis on stylized design and historical authenticity marked a departure from conventional Hollywood aesthetics of the period and proved both influential and controversial.

Following her divorce from Valentino in 1926, Rambova attempted to establish an acting career and opened a boutique in New York. During the Great Depression, she relocated to Europe, where she married a Spanish nobleman. In her later years, she became an Egyptologist, collaborating with scholars and co-authoring works on ancient Egyptian history and mythology. She died in 1966 in California of a heart attack while working on a manuscript examining patterns within the texts in the Pyramid of Unas.

== Early life ==
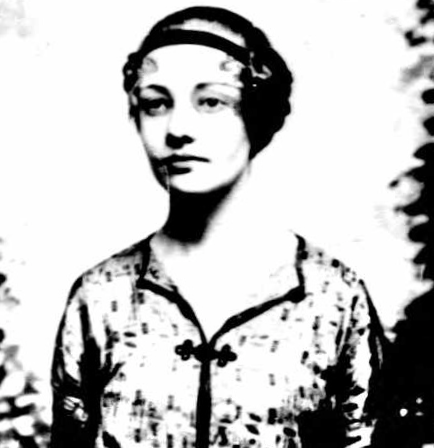
Rambova's passport photo, 1916

Rambova was born Winifred Kimball Shaughnessy on January 19, 1897, in Salt Lake City, Utah. Her father, Michael Shaughnessy, was an Irish Catholic from New York City who fought for the Union during the American Civil War and then worked in the mining industry. Her mother, Winifred Shaughnessy (née Kimball), was the granddaughter of Heber C. Kimball, a member of the first presidency of the Church of Jesus Christ of Latter-day Saints, (Note: Biographer and descendant Stanley Kimball notes in his biography Heber C. Kimball: Mormon Patriarch and Pioneer (1981) that Rambova's great-grandfather, Heber, was a sixth-generation American descended from English immigrants in the New England colony.) and was raised in a prominent Salt Lake City family. At her father's wishes, Rambova was baptized a Catholic at the Cathedral of the Madeleine in Salt Lake City in June 1897, though she later was baptized a member of the Church of Jesus Christ of Latter-day Saints at the urging of her mother at age eight.

Rambova's parents had a tumultuous relationship: her father was an alcoholic, and often sold her mother's possessions to pay off gambling debts. This led her mother to divorce Shaughnessy in 1900 and relocate with Rambova to San Francisco. There, she remarried to Edgar de Wolfe in 1907. She later married millionaire perfume mogul Richard Hudnut in 1920, and Rambova was adopted by him.

During her childhood, Rambova spent summer vacations at the Villa Trianon in Le Chesnay, France with Edgar's sister, the French designer Elsie de Wolfe. She was given the nickname "Wink" by her aunt Teresa to distinguish her from her mother because of their shared name.

A rebellious teenager, Rambova was sent by her mother to Leatherhead Court, a boarding school in Surrey, England. In her schooling, she became fascinated by Greek mythology, and also proved especially gifted at ballet. After seeing Anna Pavlova in a production of Swan Lake in Paris with her former step-aunt Elsie, Rambova decided she wanted to pursue a career as a ballerina.

== Life and career ==
=== Early dance career ===
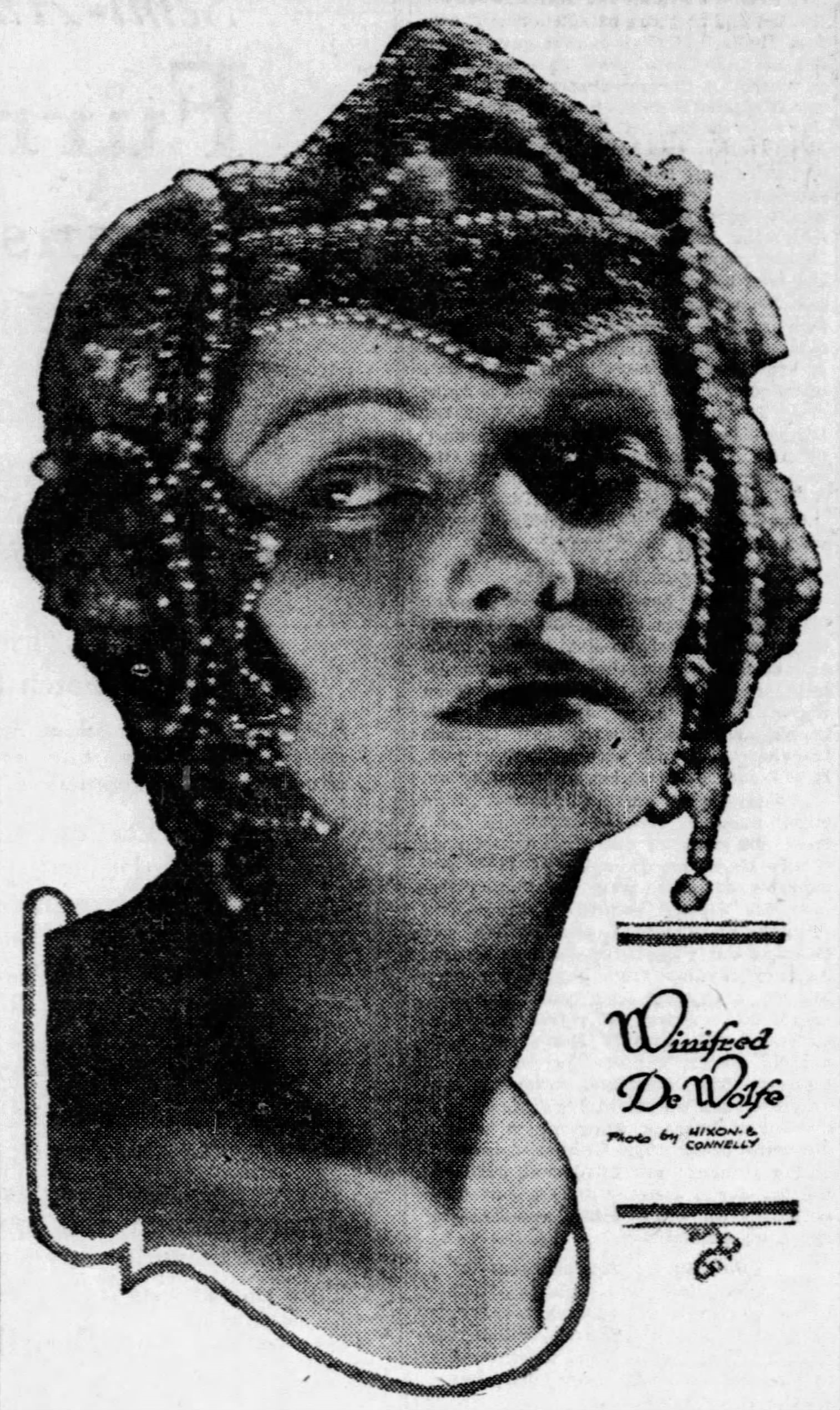
Rambova in the Chicago Tribune on September 13, 1916

Her family initially encouraged her to study ballet as a social grace rather than a profession. However, she demonstrated such exceptional talent that plans were made to take her to London and, under the management of Herbert Beerbohm Tree, place her with one of England's leading dance teachers. The outbreak of World War I disrupted these plans and prevented the journey in 1914.

Rambova made her public debut as a dancer in November 1914 at a benefit fête in Burlingame held in aid of Belgian war relief. In 1915, she continued performing throughout the San Francisco Bay Area and later that summer traveled to New York City, where she remained for an extended stay with her aunt Teresa.

=== The Imperial Russian Ballet ===
In New York, Rambova studied under the Russian ballet dancer and choreographer Theodore Kosloff, who became her lover. Standing at 5 feet 8 inches (1.73 m), Rambova was too tall to be a classical ballerina, but she was soon offered a leading part in his act. Rambova's mother was outraged upon discovering the affair and attempted to separate her from Kosloff by withholding $2,637 owed for dance lessons and gowns, offering payment only if he ceased contact. She also tried to have him arrested and deported on statutory rape charges.

Fearing that her relationship with Kosloff was about to be severed, Rambova ran way from home on April 26, 1916, and fled to Canada before sailing to Bournemouth, England. There, she stayed with Kosloff's wife Maria "Alexandria" Baldina, under an assumed role as a governess for his daughter. Two days after she went missing, Kosloff sued Rambova's mother for the unpaid bill. Her mother hired private detectives and appealed to New York Senator James A. O'Gorman, California Senator James D. Phelan, and Russian ambassador George Bakhmeteff for assistance, prompting a nationwide search. She accused Kosloff of using hypnotism on her daughter. During Kosloff's performance at a local theater in June 1916, a bouquet of American Beauty roses was thrown onto the stage accompanied by a card bearing "Winifred de Wolfe" in her handwriting. Although its source could not be determined, her relatives took it as evidence that she was alive. Kosloff subsequently issued a statement expressing hope that she would deny the allegations against him, explaining that he had remained silent because he considered her "a saint" and believed that only her devotion to art could have compelled her to leave home.

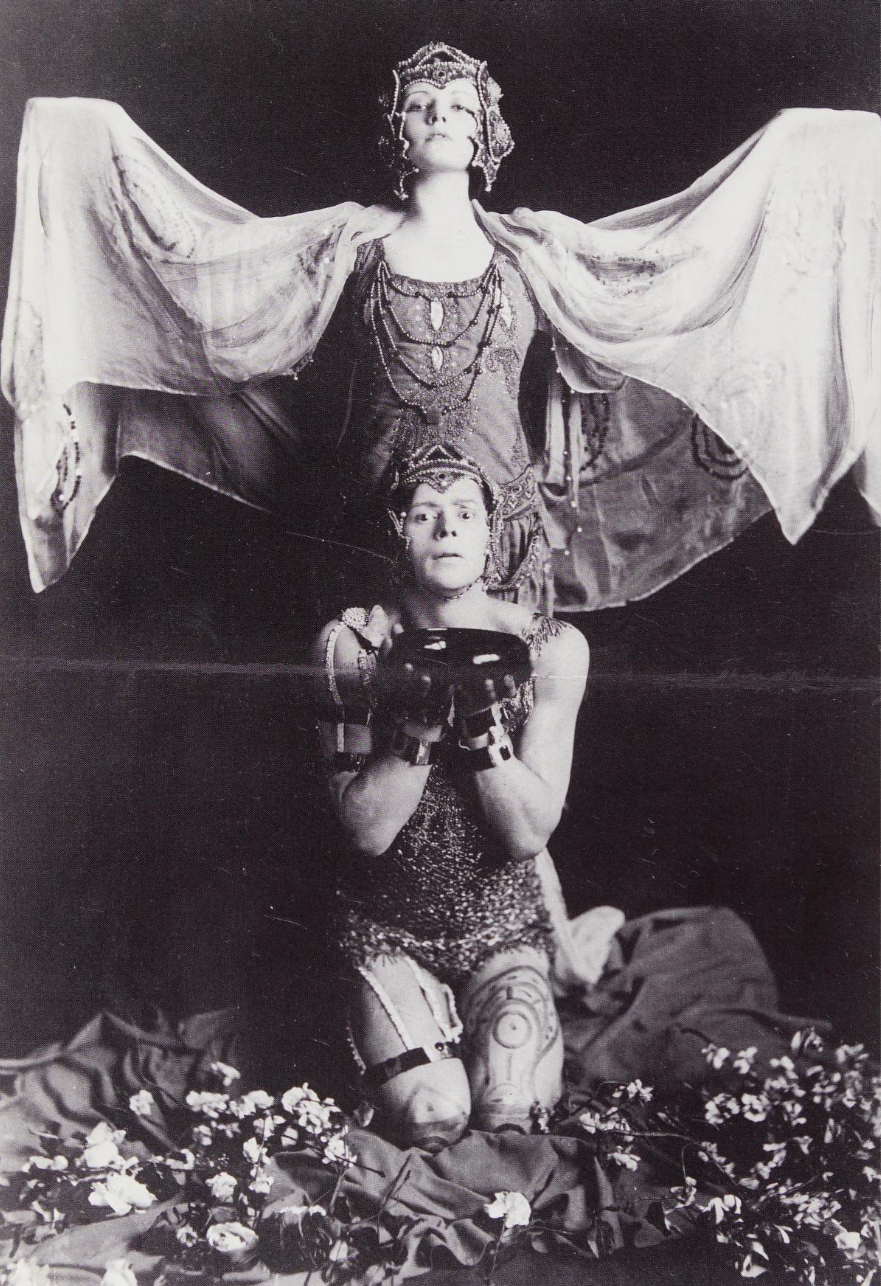
Rambova and Theodore Kosloff in costume, 1916

In July 1916, during a San Francisco engagement of Kosloff's Imperial Russian Ballet, Rambova's mother met with Kosloff and agreed to withdraw all charges, allow Rambova to continue dancing with the company, and provide financial support for costumes and sets in exchange for her daughter's return and a reconciliation. As part of their arrangement, her mother told the press that Rambova had been located in Australia and was fulfilling an engagement. In August 1916, Rambova returned to the United States and was reunited with her mother in San Francisco. Her mother followed her to Chicago and they met with the chief of the Federal Bureau of Investigation before Rambova rejoined Kosloff's company in Omaha. Shortly afterward, Kosloff suggested that she use the stage name Natacha Rambova. She also adopted a Russian persona, pretending to be a foreigner. The Los Angeles Graphics described her as a "fine example of the cultured Russian woman, as well as an artist of ability."

She eventually became disillusioned upon learning that Kosloff had affairs with Vera Fredowa and other women in the company during her absence. Like other female dancers in Kosloff's company, Rambova initially struggled to separate her devotion to dance from her relationship with him. Kosloff exercised considerable control over the women who worked with him, promising them professional success in exchange for their loyalty while relying on them to cook, design, and perform without pay. Rambova and Fredowa became the "nucleus of Kosloff's family," a close-knit group of women who worked and lived with him and even learned Russian. Fredowa later recalled that Kosloff was incapable of remaining faithful to one woman, describing him as the type of man who needed to be surrounded by a "harem." Although Rambova disapproved of the arrangement, her desire to establish herself as an artist outweighed her feelings of betrayal and disappointment.

=== Costume and set design ===
Rambova and Kosloff in costume, 1917

In 1917, Kosloff was hired by Cecil B. DeMille as a performer and costume designer for the film The Woman God Forgot, after which he and Rambova relocated from New York to Los Angeles. Rambova carried out much of the creative work as well as the historical research on Aztec culture for Kosloff, who claimed credit for these as his own. After the film's completion, DeMille offered Kosloff and his assistants further studio work, but they declined in order to continue touring on the Keith-Orpheum circuit.

In August 1917, Rambova and Fredowa performed at a benefit for the French wounded emergency fund at the Mason Opera House in Los Angeles. The next month, the Imperial Russian Ballet launched its second Los Angeles engagement. Rambova "won appreciative applause" for her American fantasy number by Victor Herbert in the opening bill. She also performed an Aztec dance with Kosloff. The tour was critically successful and concluded in New York in the spring of 1918.

Shortly thereafter, the Russian Revolution led to the confiscation of Kosloff's property in Moscow by the Bolshevik government, causing the collapse of the Imperial Russian Ballet. Although disheartened by his financial situation, Rambova was unwilling to return home and remained with the company. A final tour was planned for the 1918–19 season, during which auditions were held across the country for students to enroll in the Los Angeles dance school established by Kosloff, Rambova, and Fredowa at Trinity Auditorium. Maria Gambarelli of the New York Metropolitan Opera replaced Rambova as Kosloff's principal dance partner as Rambova increasingly concentrated on designing costumes and sets for new productions inspired by Tartar themes. The elaborate production was well received, with the press praising its "striking and spectacular" costumes and harmonious setting.

Rambova and Kosloff in costumes designed by Rambova for their Aztec dance number on the Keith-Orpheum circuit, 1917

Rambova began to resent Kosloff for taking credit for the extensive research and design work she undertook to support his emerging film career. Although Kosloff was an avid painter, he showed little interest in costume or set design and routinely presented Rambova's completed sketches to DeMille as his own after approving them. Rambova designed Kosloff's costumes for his roles in Why Change Your Wife? (1920) and Something to Think About (1920). For the film Forbidden Fruit (1921), Rambova and Mitchell Leisen were assigned to create a fantasy sequence inspired by Cinderella. The sequence became one of the film's most visually striking elements. Leisen later credited Rambova with much of the work, recalling: "I did some of the clothes for the Cinderella Ball... Natasha [sic] Rambova did the others. One of hers was a black dress for the Fairy Godmother that had little electric lights all over the skirt." Despite Rambova's contribution, Photoplay credited the film's costume designs to Claire West, head of wardrobe at the Lasky Studio. DeMille credited Kosloff with creating the costumes for the fantasy sequence, further obscuring Rambova's role.

While Rambova taught at Kosloff's dance school, actress Alla Nazimova took lessons from Kosloff in preparation for a film role. As he had previously done with DeMille, Kosloff offered to submit costume and set designs to Nazimova. Therefore, Rambova's work appearing in the dream sequences of Nazimova's film Billions (1920), which also featured girls from the Kosloff School of Dancing as nymphs. Rambova subsequently began designing for Nazimova's next project, an adaptation of Pierre Louÿs's Aphrodite. Rather than presenting the sketches himself, Kosloff asked Rambova to deliver the designs directly to Nazimova. Nazimova responded favorably but requested revisions which Rambova did immediately, making clear that she was the designer responsible for the work. Nazimova was impressed and offered Rambova a position on her production staff as an art director and costume designer, proposing a wage of up to USD $5,000 per picture (equivalent to $80,357 in 2025).

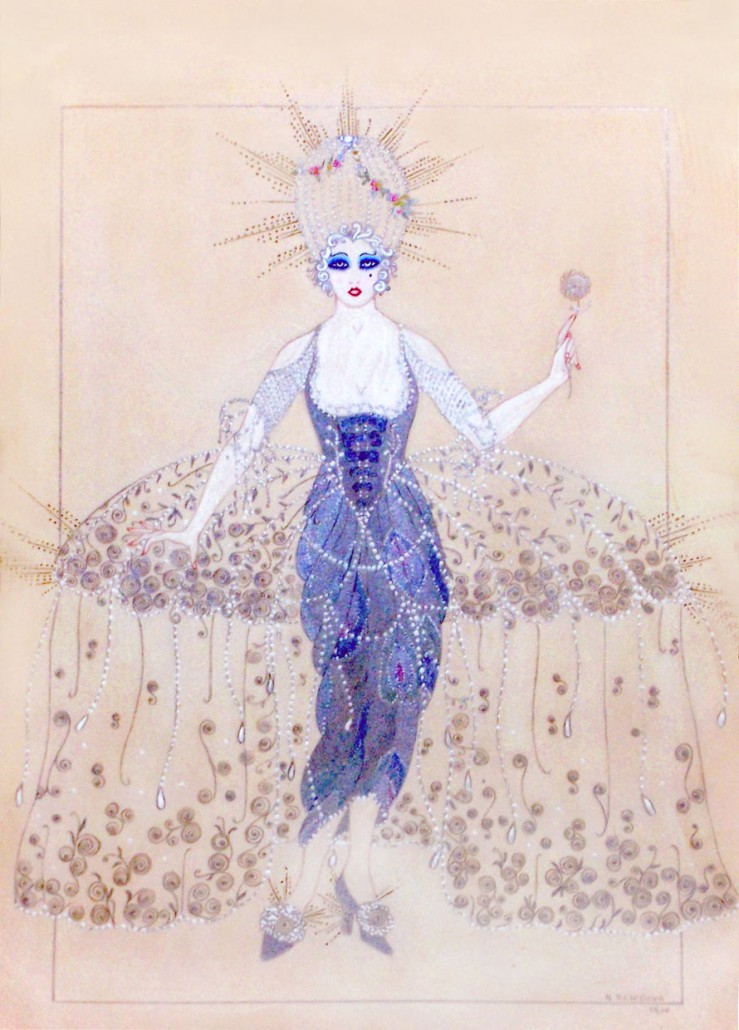
Costume concept for Forbidden Fruit (1921), designed and drawn by Rambova

Rambova used the opportunity to end her relationship with Kosloff. She chose a weekend to move out of his Franklin Avenue house while he was away at DeMille's country estate, Paradise, for relaxation and hunting. Agnes de Mille, one of Kosloff's students and DeMille's niece, later remarked that his visits there involved "girls" rather than hunting. Rambova was aware of Kosloff's affairs and sexual relationships with young pupils, which contributed to her decision to leave him. On the morning she planned to leave, Kosloff returned home unexpectedly, confronted her, and ordered her to unpack. When she refused and headed for the door, he shot her with a hunting rifle, and the bullet lodged above her knee. With the help of Fredowa, Rambova escaped through a window and reached a waiting taxi.

Rambova fled to the Metro studio, where Aphrodite was in production. French cinematographer Paul Ivano later recalled that Rambova arrived "in tears, nearly hysterical," adding, "We spent nearly the entire day picking the birdshot out of her leg, as she related how Kosloff had tried to kill her." Despite the severity of the attack, Rambova declined to press charges, fearing that the resulting publicity would damage her reputation and overshadow the beginning of her career as Nazimova's art director. In later years, she explained her injuries by claiming that she had been shot by a jealous ballerina, using the story to account for her decision to abandon her dance career. Her relationship with Kosloff had a lasting effect on Rambova, who became determined to conceal her emotions and vulnerabilities behind an air of aloof detachment.

=== Relationship with Rudolph Valentino ===
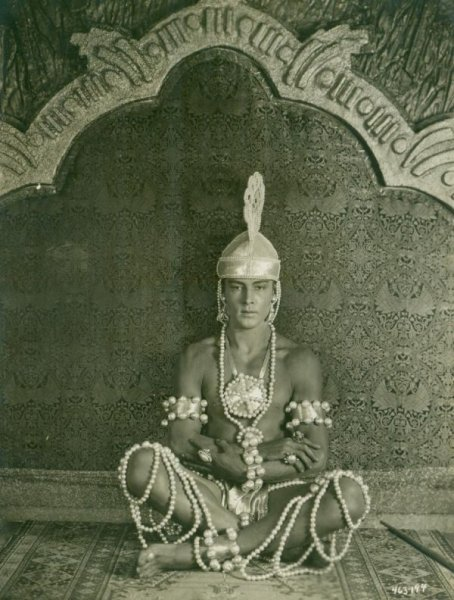
Rudolph Valentino in a costume designed by Rambova for The Young Rajah (1922)

In 1921, Rambova was introduced to actor Rudolph Valentino by Nazimova on the Metro lot while he was filming Uncharted Seas (1921). "It wasn't love at first sight," Rambova later recalled to Photoplay. "I think it was good comradeship more than anything else. We were both very lonely but we had known each other more than six months before we became interested in each other." They subsequently worked together on Camille (1921), a film that was a financial failure and resulted in Metro Pictures terminating their contract with Nazimova. While making the film, however, Rambova and Valentino became romantically involved. They married on May 13, 1922, in Mexicali, Mexico, an event described by Rambova as "wonderful … even though it did cause many worries and heartaches later."

Because Valentino had obtained only an interlocutory decree of divorce from his estranged wife, actress Jean Acker, rather than a final divorce judgment—which could be obtained only after a year had passed from the interlocutory decree—he was arrested and jailed for bigamy and had to be bailed out by friends. Rambova later claimed that Famous Players–Lasky treated Valentino harshly and attempted to separate them by sending her to New York and urging her to leave for Europe. She believed the studio regarded her as a liability to Valentino's box-office appeal and told her that he had forgotten her. She refused to leave, however, stating, "I knew my job was right here." Although the couple were forced to live separately, the ordeal brought them closer together, and they legally remarried on March 14, 1923, in Crown Point, Indiana.

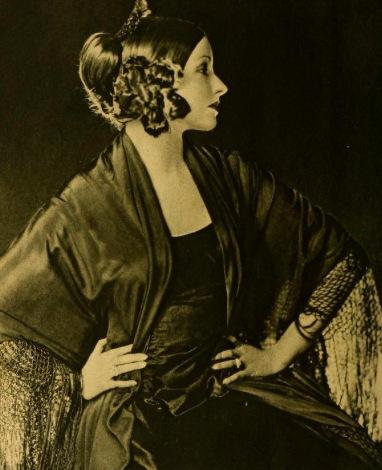
Rambova photographed by James Abbe, published in Motion Picture Magazine, March 1923

Both Rambova and Valentino were spiritualists, and they frequently consulted psychics and participated in séances and automatic writing. Valentino wrote a book of poetry, Daydreams, containing numerous poems about Rambova. Their views on domestic life, however, differed considerably. Valentino favored traditional ideals of women as wives and mothers, while Rambova was determined to maintain her career and had no interest in becoming a housewife. Valentino was known to be an excellent cook, while actress Patsy Ruth Miller suspected that Rambova did not know "how to make burnt fudge." In fact, Rambova occasionally baked and was an experienced seamstress. A major source of tension in their marriage was their differing views on having children: Valentino wanted children, while Rambova did not.

While her association with Valentino afforded Rambova a level of celebrity typically enjoyed by actors, their professional collaborations highlighted their differences more than similarities. Despite serving as Valentino's manager, she did not contribute to any of his successful films. Rambova designed authentic Indian costumes for The Young Rajah (1922) that tended to compromise his Latin lover image, and the film was a major flop.

Rambova and Valentino with their dogs at their Whitley Heights home. Published in The New Movie, August 1930

She supported Valentino's one-man strike against Famous Players–Lasky, which left him temporarily barred him from film work. During the strike, the couple embarked on a promotional dance tour for Mineralava Beauty Products in 1923. When they reached Rambova's hometown of Salt Lake City, she was billed as "The Little Pigtailed Shaughnessy Girl", a description that deeply insulted her. During the tour, Rambova and Valentino publicly criticized the Hollywood studio system. Rambova later articulated these views in an article for the summer issue of Movie Weekly, condemning graft in the motion-picture business and arguing that audiences were forced to subsidize corruption through inflated ticket prices.

In 1922, Rambova designed the costumes for Nazimova's Salomé, inspired by the work of Aubrey Beardsley. Rambova's later work with Valentino was characterized by elaborate and costly preparations for films that underperformed at the box office, including Monsieur Beaucaire (1924) and A Sainted Devil (1924).

In September 1924, Rambova and Valentino traveled through Spain to research locations, architecture, and artifacts for a planned film project, later titled The Hooded Falcon. Rambova oversaw the acquisition of props and antiques, while Valentino documented Moorish sites. The trip proved costly, exhausting research funds and resulting in significant debt. After returning to the California, the couple retreated to their home in Whitley Heights, Los Angeles, designed by Rambova as a highly stylized sanctuary emphasizing modern décor and European antiques. They socialized infrequently in Hollywood, favoring privacy and domestic life. Rambova later remarked that work was "the one thing which makes life in Hollywood tolerable."

"He knew what I was when I married him. I have been working since I was seventeen. Homes and babies are all very nice, but you can't have them and a career as well. I intended, and intend, to have a career and Valentino knew it. If he wants a housewife, he'll have to look again."

— Rambova (1925)

Rambova oversaw costume and set design by Adrian and William Cameron Menzies for The Hooded Falcon. When production delays made filming impractical, producer J. D. Williams persuaded the Valentinos to proceed with Cobra (1925) as an interim project. Rambova did some designs but took little interest in the contemporary story, later stating that modern subjects bored her unless they were "symbolic or fantastical," and ultimately relinquished production management duties to Valentino's manager George Ullman. The film was a commercial failure, with Ullman publicly attributing its problems to Rambova's influence. Sensational claims by actress Colleen Moore circulated in Hollywood, alleging that Rambova relied on daily séances to write the script. Meanwhile, production plans for The Hooded Falcon were repeatedly scaled back, and the script by June Mathis was ultimately abandoned, with setbacks often attributed to Rambova.

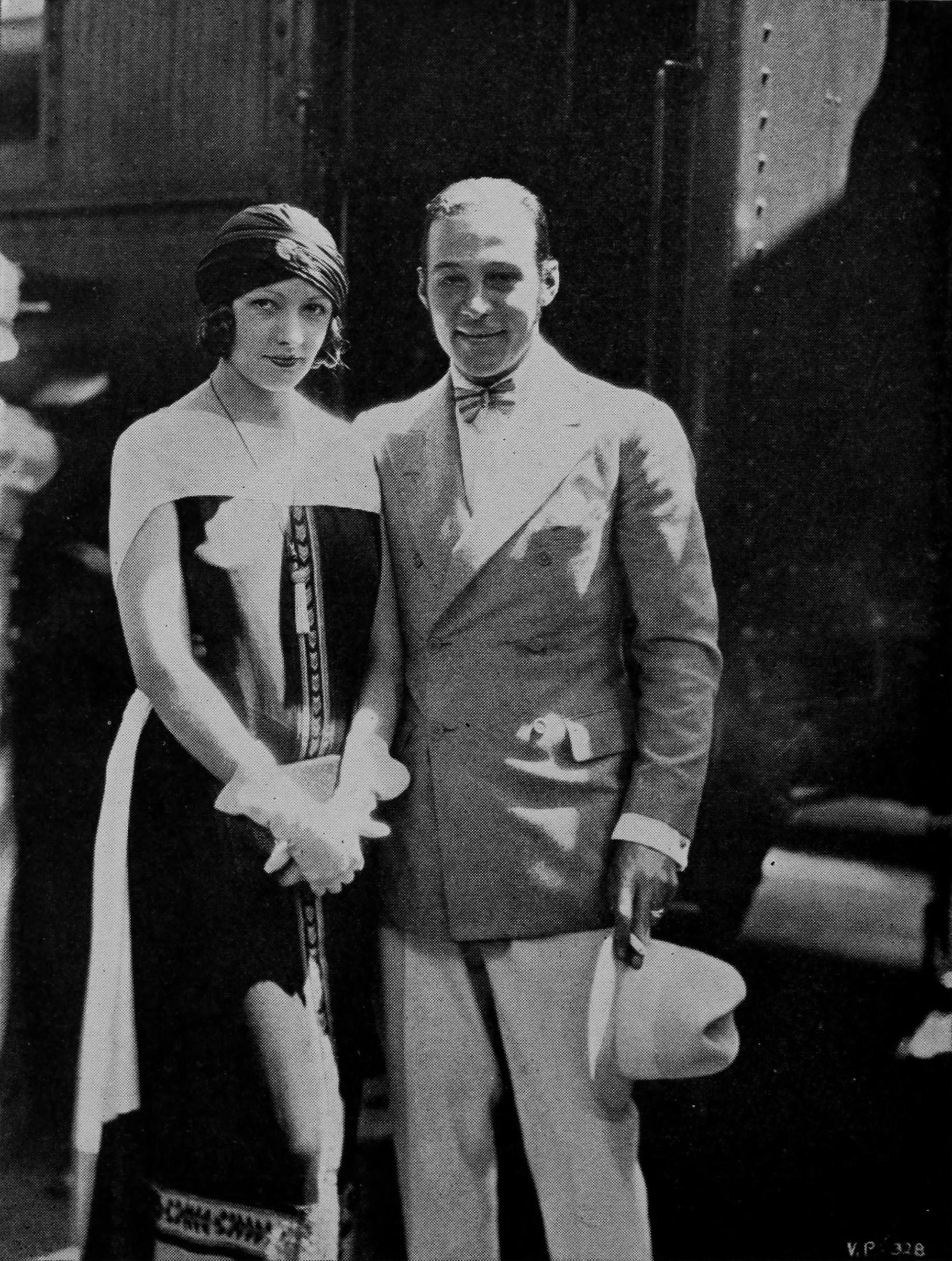
Rambova and Valentino in Los Angeles before she boarded a train for New York, shortly before announcing their separation, 1925

By this time, critics and the press were beginning to blame Rambova's excessive control for these failures. United Artists went so far as to offer Valentino an exclusive contract with the stipulation that Rambova had no negotiating power, and was disallowed from even visiting the sets of his films. After this, Rambova was offered $30,000 to create a film of her choosing, which resulted in the production of What Price Beauty?, a drama which she co-produced and co-wrote. Rambova discovered actress Myrna Loy and cast her in the film.

When Rambova and Valentino separated in 1925, she initially dismissed divorce rumors: "I'm sure this marital holiday will be a good thing for us both. When a husband and wife both are working and both are the possessors of temperaments I think they should have a vacation from each other. Since I've begun making my own pictures we have been drawn more or less apart, and I can't find the time to devote to the home that I used to. My husband is a great lover of home life."

In October 1925, it was reported that Ullman hired private detectives to follow Rambova before she left Hollywood for New York and Europe, which intensified public speculation about divorce or reconciliation. Ullman acknowledged arranging the surveillance but denied Valentino's involvement, and no explanation was publicly given. Later that month, Rambova filed for divorce in France, and the trial began in December. She was granted a divorce in Paris on the grounds of abandonment on January 19, 1926.

=== Acting and writing ===
Rambova produced and starred in the film Do Clothes Make the Woman?, co-starring Clive Brook. The film is now considered lost. The distributor marketed Rambova as "Mrs. Valentino" and changed the title to When Love Grows Cold, which she protested would harm her by creating the impression that she was profiting from deceiving the public into believing the film was about her failed marriage. The film was released in January 1926, and attracted press attention because of Rambova's "vivid individuality, her artistry, and her sensational separation from Valentino." When Love Grows Cold received mixed reviews by critics; the Dayton Herald wrote that Rambova "proves as decorative as a Benda painting and as splendid as a second Duse in the title role; and she assuredly proves the reports that have been circulated about her that she is the best-dressed woman in America today." A review in Picture Play called it "the poorest picture of the month, or of almost any month, for that matter." After its release, Rambova never again worked in film.

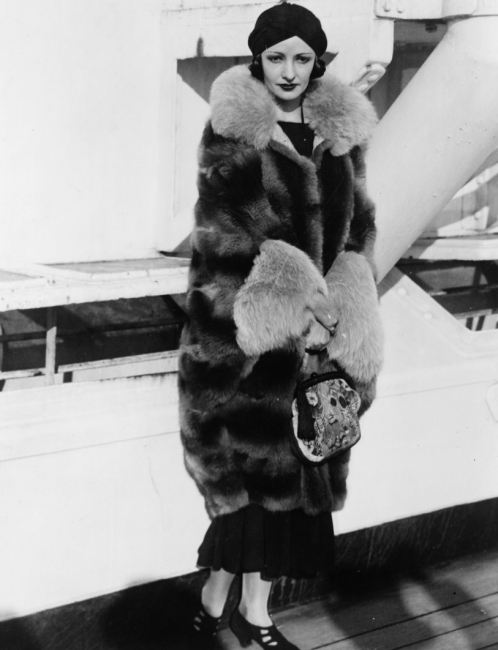
Rambova arrives in New York City on the S.S. Homeric, 1926

In February 1926, Rambova made her vaudeville debut in The Purple Vial, a one-act play based on the French work of André de Lorde. She toured the East Coast, performing at the Palace Theatre in Manhattan and the Orpheum Theater in St. Louis, Missouri. Her appearance attracted considerable interest among New York's screen actors, many of whom attended her debut to see how a silent-film star would be received in a speaking role. At the time, vaudeville managers had been seeking to recruit prominent screen actors for live performances. Rambova told the press: "I want the world to forget that I ever was his wife. My whole life will be devoted to my career. I want to be a successful actress." She received a positive reception from audiences, although one critic found her voice "not particularly resonant."

On March 2, 1926, Rambova patented a doll she had designed with a "combined coverlet."

In August 1926, Valentino died unexpectedly of peritonitis, leaving Rambova inconsolable. She reportedly locked herself in her bedroom for three days. Although she did not attend his funeral, she sent a telegram to Valentino's business manager, George Ullman, requesting that Valentino be buried in her family's crypt at Woodlawn Cemetery in the Bronx. Ullman denied the request.

Following Valentino's death, Rambova frequently attended séances with the medium George Wehner and claimed to have communicated with his spirit on several occasions. She wrote a memoir, Rudy: An Intimate Portrait of Rudolph Valentino, which was published by Hutchinson & Co in London in 1927. The final chapter that consisted of a detailed letter purportedly communicated by Valentino's spirit from an astral plane, which Rambova claimed to have received during a session of automatic writing. The American edition, Rudolph Valentino Recollections, later published by Jacobsen-Hodgkinson Corporation.

In 1927, Rambova appeared in supporting roles in two original Broadway productions: Set a Thief, a drama by Edward E. Paramore, Jr., and Creoles, a comedy by Kenneth Perkins and Samuel Shipman.

In 1928, Rambova wrote a semi-fictional play, All That Glitters, based on her relationship with Valentino which ended with a fictionalized reconciliation.

=== Fashion design ===
In June 1928, Rambova opened a couture shop on Fifth Avenue and West 55th street in Manhattan, selling Russian-inspired clothing that she designed. The shop also carried jewelry, although it is unknown if it was designed by Rambova or imported. Her clientele included Broadway and Hollywood actresses such as Beulah Bondi and Mae Murray. Upon opening the shop, Rambova commented: "I'm in business, not exactly because I need the money, but because it enables me to give vent to an artistic urge."

By late 1931, Rambova had grown uneasy about the economic situation of the United States during the Great Depression, and feared the country would experience a drastic revolution. She subsequently closed her shop and retired from fashion design, leaving the country for Juan-les-Pins, France, in January 1932. Her representatives told the press that she planned to attend fashion openings in Paris, seek new fabrics, and return in about eight weeks to reopen her shop at a new location.

=== Marriage to Álvaro de Urzáiz ===
On a yacht cruise to the Balearic Islands, she met her second husband Álvaro de Urzáiz, a British-educated Spanish aristocrat. The couple married privately in 1932, with the union not publicly disclosed until 1934. The couple lived together on the island of Mallorca and restored abandoned Spanish villas for tourists, a venture financed by Rambova's inheritance from her stepfather.

It was during her marriage to Urzáiz that Rambova first toured Egypt in January 1936, visiting the ancient monuments in Memphis, Luxor, and Thebes. While there, she met archeologist Howard Carter, and became fascinated by the country and its history, which had a profound effect on her. "I felt as if I had at last returned home," she said. "The first few days I was there I couldn't stop the tears streaming from my eyes. It was not sadness, but some emotional impact from the past – a returning to a place once loved after too long a time." Upon returning to Spain, Urzáiz became a naval commander for the pro-fascist nationalist side during the Spanish Civil War. Rambova fled the country to a familial château in Nice, where she suffered a heart attack at age forty. Soon after, she and Urzáiz separated. Rambova remained in France until the Nazi invasion in June 1940, upon which she returned to New York.

=== Egyptology and scholarly work ===
Rambova's interest in the metaphysical evolved significantly during the 1940s, and she became an avid supporter of the Bollingen Foundation, through which she believed she could see a past life in Egypt. Rambova was also a follower of Helena Blavatsky and George Gurdjieff, and she conducted classes in her Manhattan apartment about myths, symbolism, and comparative religion. She also began publishing articles on healing, astrology, yoga, post-war rehabilitation, and numerous other topics, some of which appeared in American Astrology and Harper's Bazaar. In 1945, the Old Dominion (a predecessor to the Andrew W. Mellon Foundation) awarded Rambova a grant-in-aid of USD $500 for "making a collection of essential cosmological symbols for a proposed archive of comparative universal symbolism." Rambova intended to use her research to generate a book, which she wanted Ananda Coomaraswamy to write, with the principal themes derived from astrology, theosophy, and Atlantis. In an undated letter to Mary Mellon, she wrote:

It is so necessary that gradually people be given the realization of a universal pattern of purpose and human growth, which the knowledge of the mysteries of initiation of the Atlantean past, as the source of our symbols of the Unconscious, gives ... Just as you said, knowledge of the meaning of the destruction of Atlantis and the present cycle of recurrence would give people an understanding of the present situation.

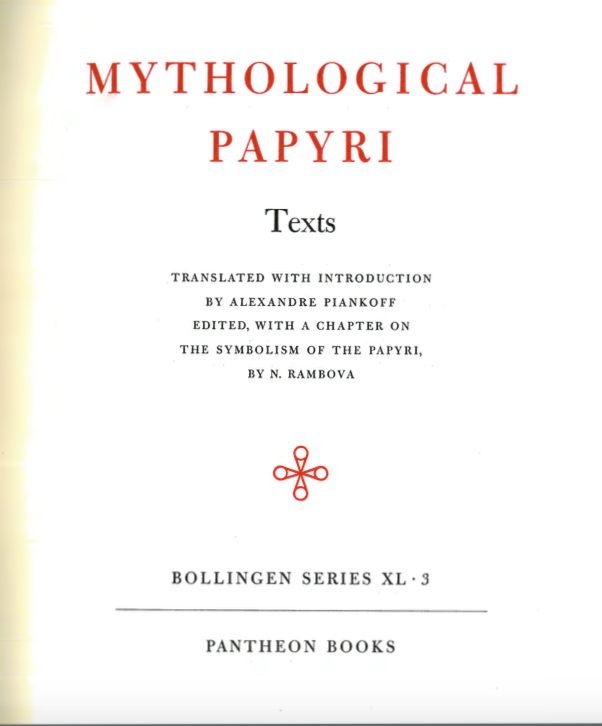
Title page of Mythological Papyri (1957)

Rambova's intellectual investment in Egypt also led her to undertake work deciphering ancient scarabs and tomb inscriptions, which she began researching in 1946. Initially, she believed she would find evidence of a connection between ancient Egyptian belief systems and those of ancient American cultures. While researching at the Institut Français d'Archéologie Orientale in Cairo, she met the institute's director, Alexandre Piankoff, with whom she established a rapport based on their shared interest in Egyptology. Piankoff introduced her to his French translation of the Book of Caverns, a royal funerary text, which he was working on at the time. "To my amazement, I found that it contains all the most important esoteric material," Rambova wrote. "I can only compare it to the Coptic Pistis Sophia, the Tibetan Voice of the Silence, and the Hindu Sutras of Patanjali. It is what I have been looking for for years."

Her interest in the Book of Caverns led her to abandon her studies of scarabs, and she began translating Piankoff's French translation into English, an endeavor she felt "was the main purpose and point" of her studies in Egypt. She secured a second two-year grant of US$50,000 through the Mellon and Bollingen Foundations (a considerably large grant for the time) to help Piankoff photograph and publish his work on the Book of Caverns. In the winter of 1949–50, she joined Piankoff and Elizabeth Thomas in Luxor to undertake further studies. In the spring of 1950, the group was given permission to photograph and study inscriptions on golden shrines that had once enclosed the sarcophagus of Tutankhamun, after which they toured the Pyramid of Unas at Saqqara.

After completing the expedition in Egypt, Rambova returned to the United States, where, in 1954, she donated her extensive collection of Egyptian artifacts to the University of Utah's Museum of Fine Arts (UMFA). She settled in New Milford, Connecticut, where she spent the following several years working as an editor on the first three volumes of Piankoff's series Egyptian Texts and Religious Representations, which was based on the research he had done with Rambova and Thomas. The first volume was The Tomb of Ramesses VI published in 1954, followed by The Shrines of Tut-Ankh-Amon in 1955. During this time, she kept regular correspondence with fellow Egyptologists William C. Hayes and Richard Parker.

For the third volume of Piankoff's series, Mythological Papyri (1957), Rambova contributed her own chapter in which she discussed semiotics in Egyptian papyri. Rambova continued to write and research intensely into her sixties, often working twelve hours per day. In the years prior to her death, she was working on a manuscript examining texts from the Pyramid of Unas for a translation by Piankoff. This manuscript, which exceeds a thousand pages, was donated to the Brooklyn Museum after her death. Two additional manuscripts were also left behind, which are part of Yale University's Yale in Egypt collection: The Cosmic Circuit: Religious Origins of the Zodiac and The Mystery Pattern in Ancient Symbolism: A Philosophic Interpretation.

== Illness and death ==
In the early 1950s Rambova developed scleroderma, which significantly affected her throat, impeding her ability to swallow and speak.

In 1957, Rambova moved to New Milford, Connecticut, and devoted her time to researching a comparative study of ancient religious symbolism, which she continued virtually unabated until her death.

She grew delusional, believing that she was being poisoned, and quit eating, resulting in malnourishment. On September 29, 1965, she was discovered going "berserk" in a hotel elevator in Manhattan. Rambova was admitted to Lenox Hill Hospital, where she was diagnosed with paranoid psychosis brought on by malnutrition.

With her health in rapid decline, Rambova's cousin, Ann Wollen, relocated her from her home in Connecticut to California, in order to help take care of her. There, Rambova was admitted to Methodist Hospital in Arcadia. On January 19, 1966, she was relocated to a nursing home at Las Encinas Hospital in Pasadena. She died there six months later of a heart attack on June 5, 1966, at the age of 69. At her wishes, Rambova was cremated, and her ashes were scattered in a forest in northern Arizona.

She left an estate valued at $368,000, a large collection of Tibetan-Lamaist art and ritual objects—donated to the Philadelphia Museum of Art—and an unfinished 1,000-page manuscript examining patterns in the texts of the Pyramid of Unas.

== Sexuality ==
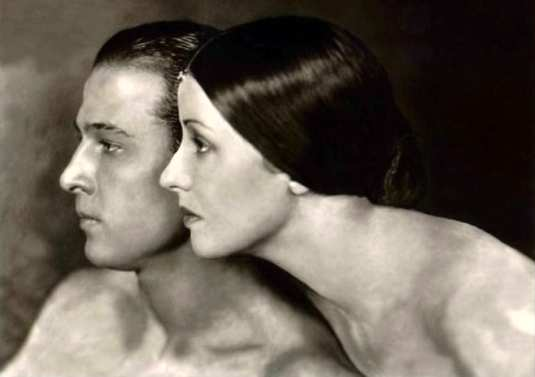
Portrait of Valentino and Rambova by James Abbe, 1923

Claims that Rambova was bisexual or homosexual date back to at least 1975 when they appeared in Kenneth Anger's notoriously libelous Hollywood Babylon, in which it is written that Rambova claimed to have never consummated her marriage with Rudolph Valentino. This has led some historians to refer to the couple's union as a "lavender marriage." The claim, however, is at odds with the grounds of Valentino's 1922 arrest after the couple's wedding: he was arrested and jailed for consummating the marriage in Palm Springs, California, despite still being legally married to Jean Acker. Discussion of Rambova's sexuality continued to appear in academic and biographical texts throughout the 1980s and beyond. (Note: Claims that Rambova was bisexual or a lesbian arose in several academic and historical publications in the late-1980s and 1990s, including articles in the London Theatre Record, as well as several books, such as Who was that Man?: A Present for Mr. Oscar Wilde (1988) by Neil Bartlett, and Dell Richards's Lesbian Lists: A Look at Lesbian Culture, History, and Personalities (1990).)

The basis of the claim is an alleged relationship Rambova had with Alla Nazimova, (Note: Ty Burr notes these perceptions and rumors surrounding Rambova, Nazimova, and Valentino in his book Gods Like Us: On Movie Stardom and Modern Fame (2012), and Nazimova and Rambova's alleged relationship is also written about extensively in The Girls: Sappho Goes to Hollywood (2001) by historian Diane McLellan, as well as several other books.) her friend and peer while Rambova was beginning her career in film design. (Note: D. Michael Quinn points out the ambiguity regarding the allegations that Rambova was bisexual and had a romantic relationship with Alla Nazimova. She purportedly told friends she "hated lesbians" during her relationship with Valentino, which has been interpreted as both genuine and as potentially reflective of her own self-hatred and psychological denial over her sexuality. Some sources less definitively allege only her relationship with Nazimova, while others refer to her as Valentino's "lesbian wife.") Similar inferences have been made about others in Nazimova's social circle, including Marlene Dietrich, Eva Le Gallienne, and Greta Garbo.

Several sources have disputed such claims, including journalist David Wallace, who dismisses it as rumor in his 2002 book Lost Hollywood. Biographer Morris also refutes the claim, writing in his epilogue of Madam Valentino that "the convenient … allegation that Rambova was a lesbian collapses when one scrutinizes the facts." Additionally, a close friend of writer Mercedes de Acosta (also an alleged lover of Nazimova) told Morris that she believed Rambova and Nazimova's relationship was nothing other than platonic. Rambova's friend Dorothy Norman also stated that Rambova had been "displeased" by De Acosta's controversial 1960 autobiography, which implied she was bisexual or homosexual, as it had "cast her in an improper light." In his 1996 book The Silent Feminists, Anthony Slide stated that "all who [knew] Rambova deny that she was a gay woman."

== Influence ==
=== Design and fashion ===
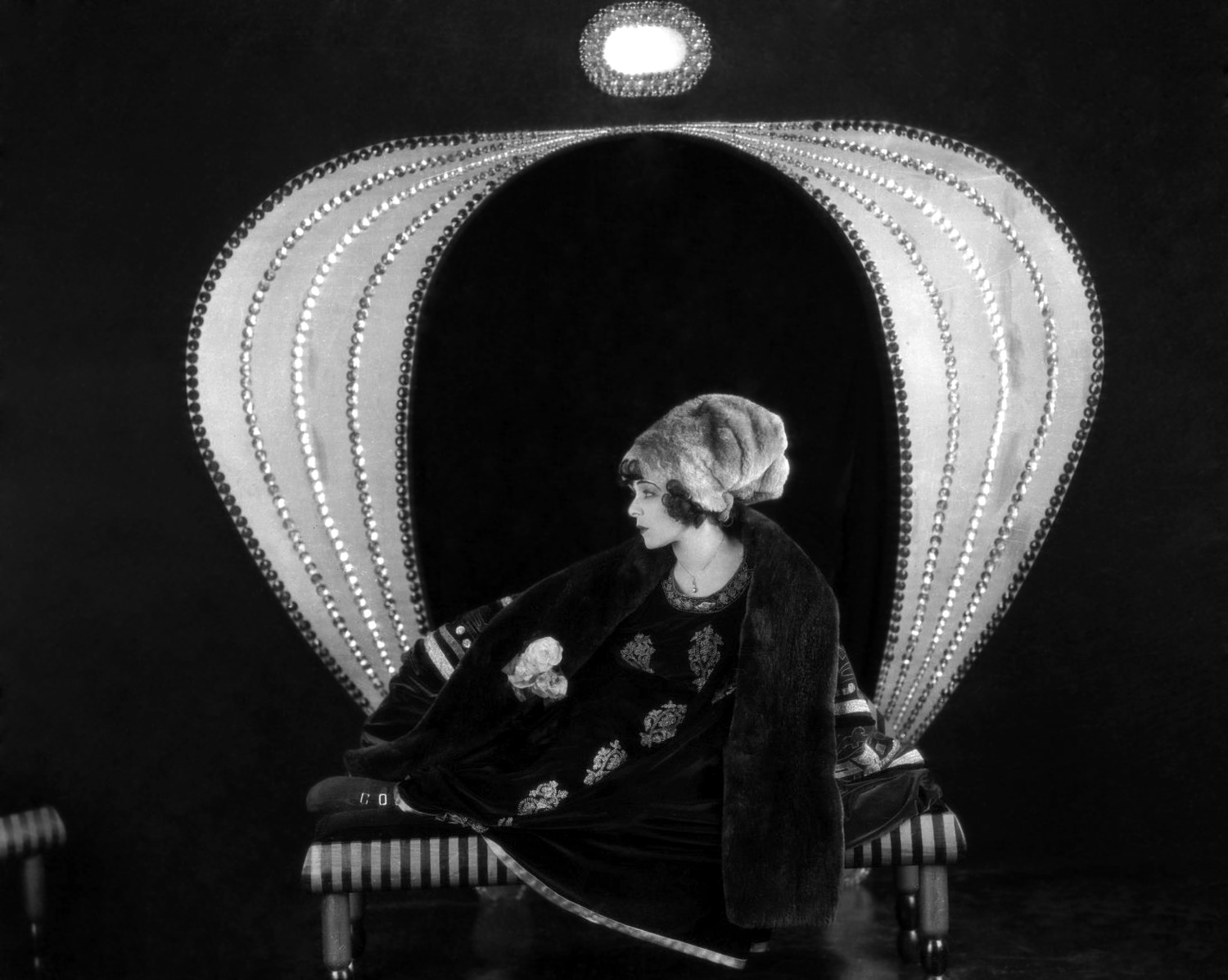
Alla Nazimova in Camille (1921); Rambova's "exotic" set and costume designs in the film blended elements of Art Deco and Art Nouveau

Rambova was one of the few women in Hollywood during the 1920s to serve as a head art designer in film productions. At the time, her costume and set designs were considered "highly stylized," and divided opinion among critics. A 1925 Picture Play magazine profile on What Price Beauty? noted the "bizarre" effects present, adding: "Miss Rambova insists the picture will be popular in its appeal, and not, as one might think, 'arty.'" Rambova's sets incorporated shimmering shades of silver and white against sharp "moderne" lines, and blended elements of Bauhaus and Asian-inspired geometries.

Stylistically, Rambova favored designers such as Paul Poiret, Léon Bakst, and Aubrey Beardsley. She specialized in "exotic" and "foreign" effects in both costume and stage design. For costumes she favored bright colors, baubles, bangles, shimmering draped fabrics, sparkles, and feathers. She also strived for historical accuracy in her costume and set designs. As noted in The Moving Picture World's review of The Woman God Forgot (1917), Rambova's first film project: "To the student of history the accuracy of the exteriors, interiors, costumes, and accessories … [the film] will make strong appeal."

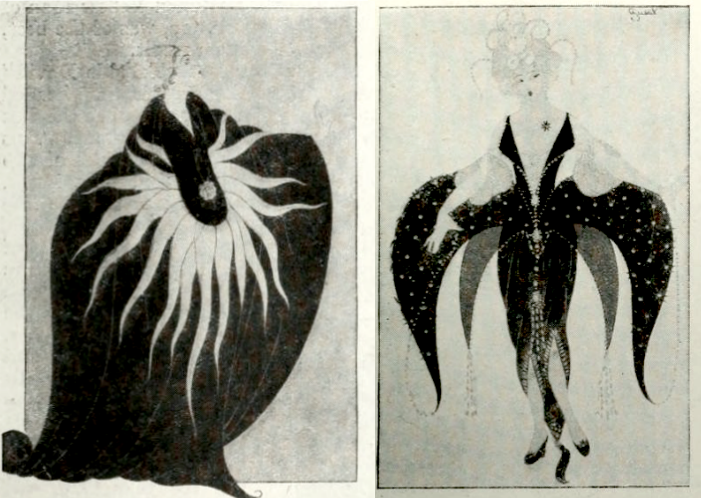
Costume designs by Rambova published in Photoplay, December 1922

Commenting on her career in film, design historian Robert La Vine proclaimed Rambova one of the "most inventive designers ... ever," also noting her as one of few who crafted both sets and costumes. Film historian Robert Klepper wrote of her designs in Camille (1921): "In evaluating the film today, one has to give art director Natacha Rambova her due credit for her vision as an artist. The deco sets are beautiful, and the ultra modern design was far ahead of its time. Although Rambova may have influenced her future husband Valentino to make some bad business decisions, her talent as an artist cannot be denied." Historian Pat Kirkham also praised her contributions to film, writing that she created "some of the most visually unified films in Hollywood history." Costume historian Deborah Landis named Rambova's white rubberized tunic (worn by Alla Nazimova) and the Art Deco-inspired imagery of Salome (1922) among the "most memorable in motion picture history."

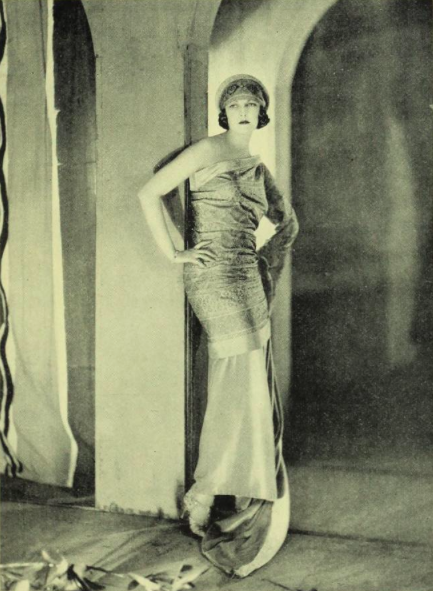
Rambova wearing a dress by Paul Poiret in Paris, 1923

Though her work in both set and costume design has been deemed influential by film and fashion historians alike, (Note: Several fashion and textile historians have proclaimed Rambova's film and fashion design as historically relevant (including Heather Vaughan and Robert La Vine), and have noted her influence.) Rambova herself claimed to "loathe fashion," adding:

I want to dress in a way that is becoming to me, whether it is the style of the hour or not. So it should be with all women, in my opinion. All women should not wear knee-length skirts, even if that is the prevailing fashion; clothes that are becoming to the tall, languid type, would not do at all for a short girl of the staccato type, who has to have sharp clothes to express her personality.

Thus, Rambova's approach to fashion design in her post-film career was conscious of the individual, a practice which fashion historian Heather Vaughan suggests was carried over from her past designing movie costumes for "individual character types." Vaughan adds: "While not necessarily an innovator of fashion, her Hollywood cachet and ability to synthesize fashion and traditional cultures allowed her to create designs and a personal style that continues to fascinate."

Rambova's clothing designs drew on various influences, described by fashion critics as blending and re-working elements of Renaissance, 18th-century, Oriental, Grecian, Russian, and Victorian fashion. Common preferences in her work included the dolman sleeve, long skirts with high waists, premium velvets, and intricate embroidery, as well as incorporation of geometric shapes and use of "vivid colors … that are violent and definite. Scarlets, vermilions, strong blues, [and] blazoning purples." She was cited as influential by several designers with whom she worked, including Norman Norell, Adrian, and Irene Sharaff. Rambova typically dressed in the style of her designs, and thus her personal style was also influential: She often wore her hair in coiled "ballerina style" braids, sometimes covered in a headscarf or turban, with dangling earrings and calf-length velvet or brocade skirts. Actress Myrna Loy once proclaimed Rambova the "most beautiful woman she'd ever seen."

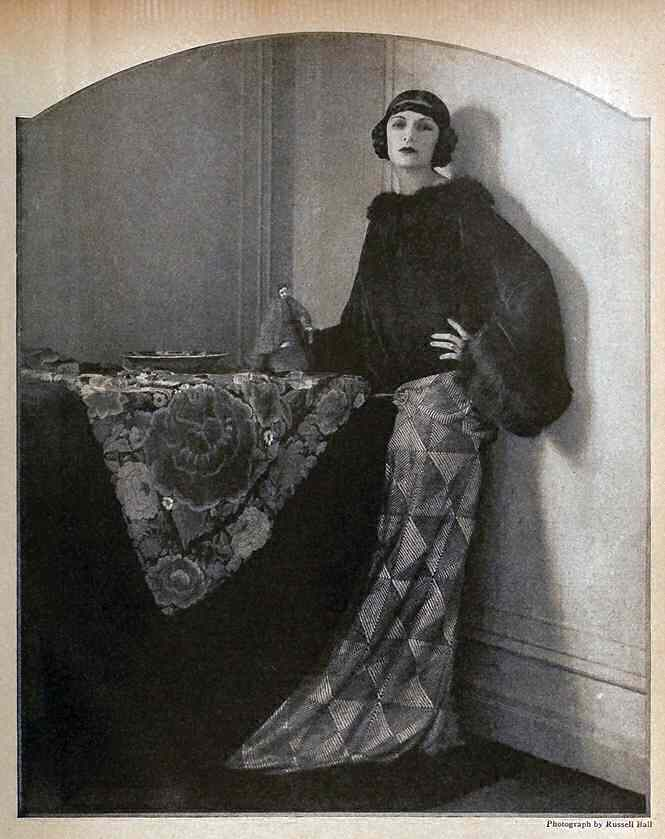
Rambova photographed by Russell Ball in Motion Picture Magazine, September 1924

In 2003, Rambova was posthumously inducted into the Costume Designers' Guild Hall of Fame.

=== Scholarly work ===
Rambova's scholarly work has been regarded as significant by contemporary academics in the fields of Egyptology and history: archaeologist Barbara Lesko notes that her contribution to Piankoff's Mythological Papyri "demonstrates her organizational skills and her commitment to searching out truths and does not reek of unfounded theories or other eccentricity." Rambova's research, specifically her metaphysical interpretations of texts, has been deemed useful by Egyptologists Rudolph Anthes, Edward Wente, and Erik Hornung. In the 1950s, Rambova donated her extensive collection of Egyptian artifacts to the University of Utah. The collection is displayed at the Utah Museum of Fine Arts as the Natacha Rambova Collection of Egyptian Antiquities. Both Rambova and her mother were credited as "vital" to the establishment of the museum through their donations of paintings, furniture, and artifacts.

== Legacy ==
In 1991, Michael Morris' book Madam Valentino: The Many Lives of Natacha Rambova was published by Abbeville Press.

In 2019, a documentary titled Behind the Shadow of Natacha Rambova was presented at the Atlàntida Film Festival in Majorca.

=== Cultural depictions ===
Rambova has been depicted across several mediums, including visual art, film, and television. As a teenager, she was painted in Paris by American artist Robert Lee MacCameron. The French government considered display the portrait at the Louvre. She was also the subject of a 1925 painting by Serbian artist Paja Jovanović. Her mother donated both paintings to the Utah Museum of Fine Arts in 1949. In 1975, she was portrayed by Yvette Mimieux in Melville Shavelson's television film The Legend of Valentino (1975), and again by Michelle Phillips in Ken Russell's feature film Valentino (1977). Ksenia Jarova later portrayed her in the American silent film Silent Life (2016), and she also figured in a fictionalized narrative in the network series American Horror Story: Hotel (2015), played by Alexandra Daddario.

== Filmography ==
Year	Title	Role	Notes	Ref.
1917	The Woman God Forgot §	—N/a	Costumes	
1920	Why Change Your Wife? §	—N/a	Costumes worn by Theodore Kolsoff	
1920	Something to Think About §	—N/a	Costumes worn by Theodore Kolsoff	
1920	Billions	—N/a	Costumes and sets	
1921	Forbidden Fruit §	—N/a	Costumes and sets, with Mitchell Theisen	
1921	Aphrodite	—N/a	Costumes and sets; never made	
1921	Camille §	—N/a	Costumes and sets	
1922	Beyond the Rocks §	—N/a	Costumes worn by Rudolph Valentino	
1922	The Young Rajah	—N/a	Costumes and sets	
1922	A Doll's House	—N/a	Costumes and sets	
1923	Salomé §	—N/a	Costumes and sets	
1924	Monsieur Beaucaire §	—N/a	Art director, sets, costumes, with George Barbier	
1924	The Hooded Falcon	—N/a	Supervisor, write, costumes, with Adrian; never made	
1924	A Sainted Devil	—N/a	Sets and costumes, with Adrian	
1925	Cobra §	—N/a	Costumes, with Adrian	
1926	When Love Grows Cold	Margaret Benson	Orig. title: Do Clothes Make the Woman?; only acting credit	
1928	What Price Beauty?	—N/a	Producer, design supervisor; filmed in 1925	

§ Indicates surviving films

== Stage credits ==
Year	Title	Role	Run date(s)	Venue	No. of performances	Notes	Ref.
1927	Set a Thief	Anne Dowling	February 21 – May 1	Empire Theatre	80	Broadway	
1927	Creoles	Golondrina	September 22 – October 16	Klaw Theatre	28	Broadway	

== Bibliography ==
=== Authored works ===
- Rambova, Natacha (1927). Rudy: An Intimate Portrait by His Wife Natacha Rambova. Hutchinson & Co.
  - Rambova, Natacha (2009). Rudolph Valentino: A Wife's Memories of an Icon. [Afterword by Hala Pickford; reprint of Rudy: An Intimate Portrait]. PVG Publishing. ISBN 978-0-981-64404-2.
- Rambova, Natacha (1927). Rudolph Valentino Recollections: Intimate and Interesting Reminiscences of the Life of the Late World-Famous Star. Jacobsen-Hodgkinson Corporation.
- Rambova, Natacha (February 1942 – June 1943). "Astrological Psycho-Chemistry". American Astrology.
- Rambova, Natacha (June–July 1942). "Strength ... Serenity ... Security". Harper's Bazaar.
- Rambova, Natacha (July 1942). "America: Her purpose and three great trials for Liberty–Equality–Unity". American Astrology.
- Rambova, Natacha (November 1942). "America's Destiny". American Astrology.
- Rambova, Natacha (1957). "The Symbolism of the Papyri". In Rambova, Natacha; Piankoff, Alexandre (eds.). Mythological Papyri. Egyptian Religious Texts and Representations (Bollingen Series XL). Vol. III. Pantheon Books. pp. 29–50. (Note: The full text of Mythological Papyri, featuring Rambova's chapter "The Symbolism of the Papyri," is available at the Internet Archive.)
- Rambova, Natacha (2015). All That Glitters: A Play in Three Acts. [Foreword by Hala Pickford; published posthumously]. Theodosia Tramp Publishing. ISBN 978-0-982-77096-2.

=== Edited works ===
- Rambova, Natacha; Piankoff, Alexandre, eds. (1954). The Tomb of Ramesses VI. Egyptian Religious Texts and Representations (Bollingen Series XL). Vol. I. Pantheon Books.
- Rambova, Natacha; Piankoff, Alexandre, eds. (1955). The Shrines of Tut-Ankh-Amon. Egyptian Religious Texts and Representations (Bollingen Series XL). Vol. II. Pantheon Books.
- Rambova, Natacha; Piankoff, Alexandre, eds. (1957). Mythological Papyri. Egyptian Religious Texts and Representations (Bollingen Series XL). Vol. III. Pantheon Books.
