= What Price Beauty? =

1928 film by Tom Buckingham

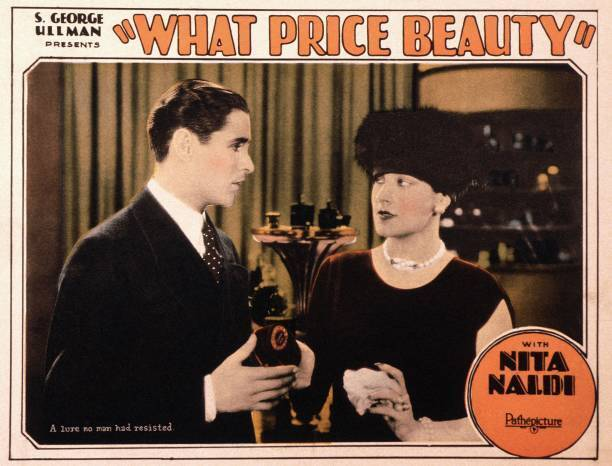
- Directed by: Tom Buckingham
- Written by: Malcolm Stuart Boylan; Natacha Rambova
- Produced by: Natacha Rambova; S. George Ulmann; Rudolph Valentino
- Starring: Nita Naldi; Natacha Rambova; Pierre Gendron
- Cinematography: Devereaux Jennings
- Production company: S. George Ullman
- Distributed by: Pathé Exchange
- Release date: January 18, 1928
- Country: United States
- Languages: Silent; English intertitles

What Price Beauty? is a 1928 American silent drama film directed by Tom Buckingham and starring Nita Naldi, Natacha Rambova and Pierre Gendron. Shot in May 1925 but not released until January 1928, the film features the future star Myrna Loy in a small role. Her performance attracted widespread interest, boosting her career.

The film's sets were designed by the art director William Cameron Menzies.

== Plot ==
An exotic vamp and a nice country girl compete over the manager of a beauty parlour.

== Cast ==
- Nita Naldi as Rita Rinaldi
- Natacha Rambova
- Pierre Gendron as John Clay
- Virginia Pearson as Mary
- Dolores Johnson
- Sally Winters
- La Supervia
- Marilyn Newkirk
- Victor Potel
- Caroline Rankin
- Templar Saxe
- Leo White
- Rosalind Byrne
- Myrna Loy as Vamp
