= When Love Grows Cold =

1926 film by Harry O. Hoyt

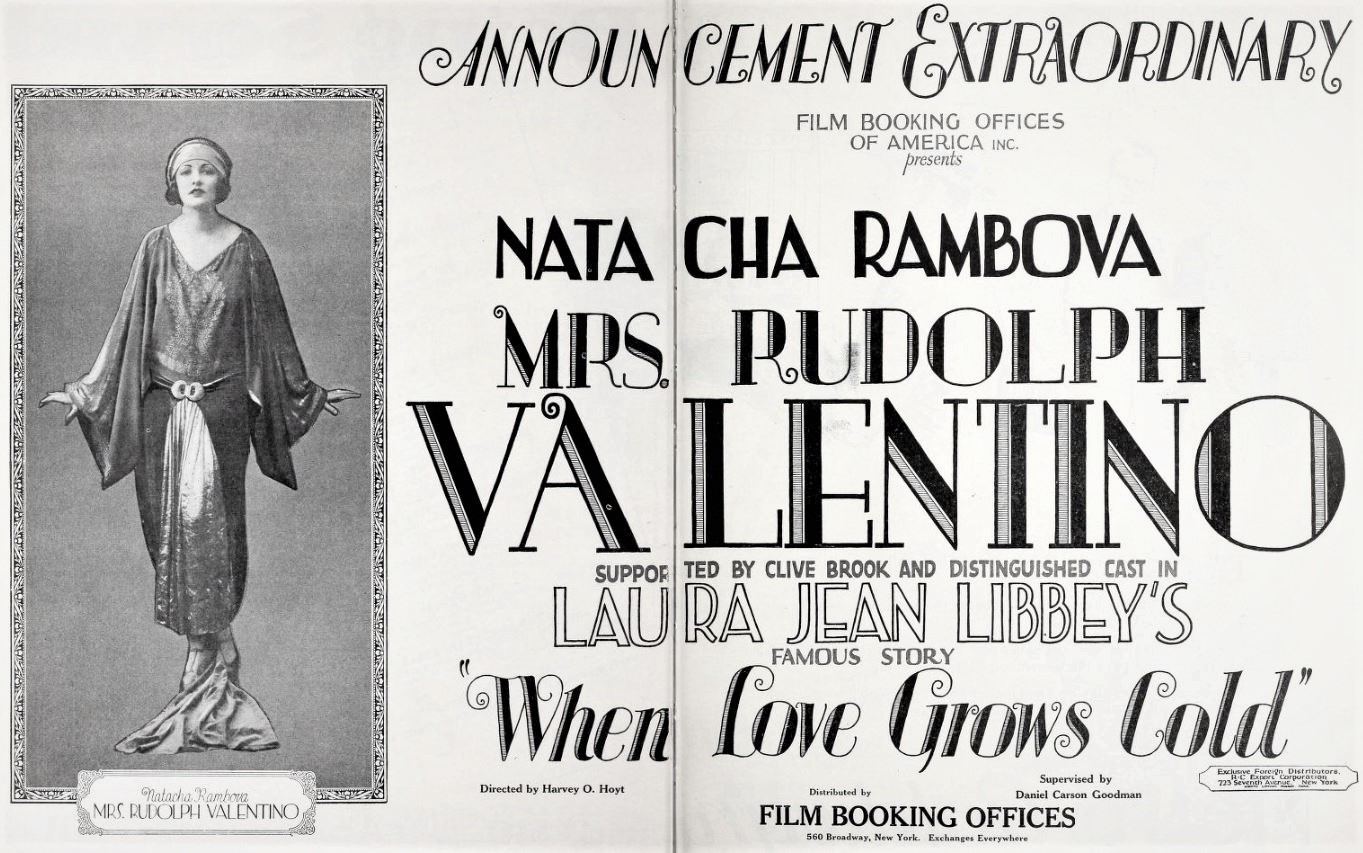
- Trade advertisement
- Directed by: Harry O. Hoyt
- Written by: Harry O. Hoyt (continuity)
- Based on: "When Love Grows Cold" by Laura Jean Libbey
- Produced by: Robertson-Cole
- Starring: Natacha Rambova; Clive Brook
- Cinematography: William Miller
- Production company: Robertson-Cole Pictures Corporation
- Distributed by: Film Booking Offices of America
- Release date: January 31, 1926
- Running time: 7 reels
- Country: United States
- Language: Silent (English intertitles)

When Love Grows Cold is a 1926 American silent drama film directed by Harry O. Hoyt, and starring Clive Brook and Natacha Rambova in her only screen starring performance. Rambova was chiefly famous for being the wife of Rudolph Valentino.

== Plot ==
As described in film magazine reviews, Margaret Benson gives up her stage career to marry Jerry Benson, a dreamer who fails to put over his plans when he gets his chance before a mammoth oil company board. The wife, however, goes before the board and gets the plans approved. Wealth comes to the family and Jerry becomes a company official. Chorus girl Gloria Trevor becomes a tool of William Graves, president of the firm, in a plot to break up the Benson home by luring the husband away from his wife. Graves covets Margaret, so he ruins Jerry in the stock market. Jerry has become infatuated with Gloria, and one night the husband returns home with the chorus girl, who manages to have herself invited to stay the night. She is caught attempting to put the husband in a compromising position by Margaret but, in the domestic scene which ensues, Jerry sides with Gloria, and the wife leaves. Gloria then reveals the duplicity of Graves and the husband, realizing his wife’s loyalty, returns to her in time to save their child from being run over. With the plot of Graves having failed, a reconciliation follows as Margaret and Jerry are reunited.

== Cast ==
- Natacha Rambova as Margaret Benson
- Clive Brook as Jerry Benson
- Sam Hardy as William Graves
- Kathryn Carver as Gloria Trevor (credited as Kathryn Hill)
- John Gough as Alec Clark
- Kathleen Martyn as Vera Clark
- Russell Griffin as Child (uncredited)

== Production ==
During production, When Love Grows Cold had the working title Do Clothes Make the Woman? However, after Rudolph Valentino's 1925 divorce from Natacha Rambova, when the film was released in January 1926 the distributor took the opportunity to prominently credit her as "Mrs. Valentino" on film posters and advertisements and changed the title of the film to When Love Grows Cold. Rambova was greatly offended by this action and never worked in film again.

== Preservation ==
With no prints of When Love Grows Cold located in any film archives, it is a lost film. Only bit fragments and a trailer survive from this film.
