= Winifred Edwards =

English ballet dancer and teacher (1895–1989)

Winifred Edwards (29 January 1895 – 12 February 1989), also known as Vera Fredowa (sometimes spelled Fredova), was an English ballet dancer and teacher. She danced with Anna Pavlova's company and Theodore Kosloff's Imperial Russian Ballet in the early 20th century and later became a distinguished pedagogue at the Royal Ballet School, where she trained and mentored several leading figures of British ballet.

== Biography ==
=== Early life and training ===
Winifred Edwards was born in London on 29 January 29 1895. She studied classical ballet with Enrico Cecchetti and Ivan Clustine, ballet master at the Paris Opera.

=== Dancing career and relationship with Theodore Kosloff ===
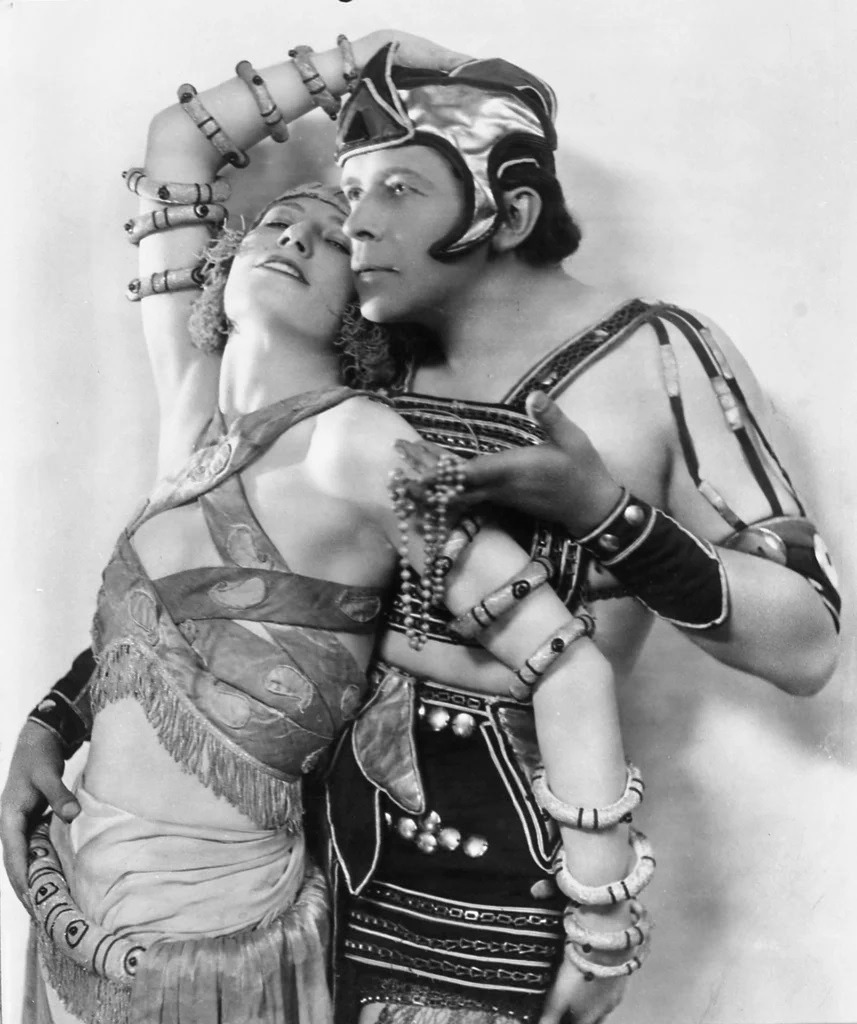
Fredowa and Theodore Kosloff in costume, 1926

During Anna Pavlova's London season in 1912, Edwards reportedly waited outside the stage door each night to see her idol. One evening Pavlova asked if she was a dancer and subsequently invited her to join her company. As was customary at the time for some English dancers working in Russian companies, Pavlova gave her a Russified stage name, Vera Fredowa. Edwards danced with Pavlova for four years on international tours and was particularly admired for her interpretation of Giselle, which she described as one of the finest pieces of acting she had ever witnessed.

In 1916, Edwards joined Theodore Kosloff's Imperial Russian Dance Company in the United States. She soon became Kosloff's lover and a close friend of Natacha Rambova (born Winifred Shaughness), who was also involved with him. In 1917, Kosloff, Rambova, and Edwards settled in Los Angeles, renting a house and erecting a tent in the backyard to serve as a temporary dance school and studio. They also worked as technical advisers to a film studio, overseeing choreography and movement for Kosloff's first screen role in The Woman God Forgot (1917). In August 1917, Fredowa and Rambova performed at a benefit for the French wounded emergency fund at the Mason Opera House in Los Angeles.

Fredowa continued touring with the Imperial Russian Ballet until is dissolution in 1919. That year, the Kosloff School of Dance was established at Trinity Auditorium in Los Angeles by Kosloff with Rambova and Fredowa as instructor, which attracted a large number of student applications. She had a cameo as Kosloff's dancing partner in the film Hollywood (1923). Fredowa continued performing with Kosloff through the 1920s and early 1930s. She became his partner in his ballet schools, teaching in Los Angeles, San Francisco, Dallas, and Houston until 1934.

In August 1934, she was named in the divorce petition filed by Kosloff's estranged wife, Maria "Alexandria" Baldina, who objected to Fredowa living with the couple. Fredowa later stated that Kosloff exerted extensive control over the personal and professional lives of women in his company in exchange for promises of career advancement, recalling that "it became apparent to all of us that Kosloff would never be faithful to one woman. He was the type of man who could only be happy if he were surrounded by a harem."

=== Return to England and teaching career ===
Edwards returned to England in 1934 due to her mother's declining health. During World War II, she served with the British Red Cross and also worked on an ecological survey in Dorset. She subsequently trained as a teacher under Phyllis Bedells at the Royal Academy of Dancing, earning her teaching qualification at the age of 53.

In 1947, while attending a summer school run by Ninette de Valois, Edwards was invited to join the teaching staff of Sadler's Wells Ballet School (later the Royal Ballet School). She taught there until 1955 during a period of rapid expansion and served on a working panel to revise the major syllabuses of the Royal Academy of Dancing, updating a training system first formulated in 1922 to better reflect contemporary ballet practice across the Commonwealth. She continued to teach privately after formally retiring at the age of 60.

Edwards was known for her strict discipline, clarity of method, and dedication to classical tradition. Although feared by some students, she was also deeply respected and admired. Among those who credited her influence were Antoinette Sibley, Anthony Dowell, Lynn Seymour, Deanne Bergsma, David Wall, Monica Mason, and Lesley Collier. Sibley later recalled that Edwards "built the foundation for everything I do," noting that she repeatedly returned to Edwards's syllabus throughout her career.

=== Later life and death ===
In 1985, Edwards went to live in a Putney nursing home. She died at the age of 94 in London on 12 February 1989.
