= The Green Temptation =

1922 film by William Desmond Taylor

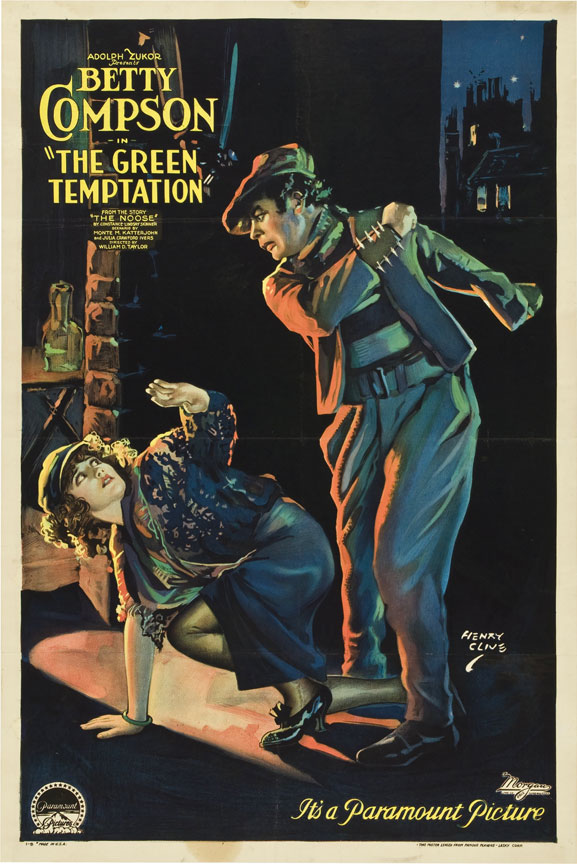
- Film Poster
- Directed by: William Desmond Taylor
- Written by: Julia Crawford Ivers (scenario); Monte Katterjohn (scenario)
- Based on: "The Noose" by Constance Lindsay Skinner
- Produced by: Adolph Zukor; Jesse L. Lasky
- Starring: Betty Compson; Theodore Kosloff
- Cinematography: James Van Trees
- Distributed by: Paramount Pictures
- Release date: April 2, 1922
- Running time: 60 minutes; 6 reels
- Country: United States
- Language: Silent (English intertitles)

The Green Temptation is a 1922 American silent melodrama film directed by William Desmond Taylor and starring Betty Compson. It was written by Julia Crawford Ivers and Monte Katterjohn based upon the short story "The Noose" by Constance Lindsay Skinner, which was originally published in Ainslee's Magazine in 1920.

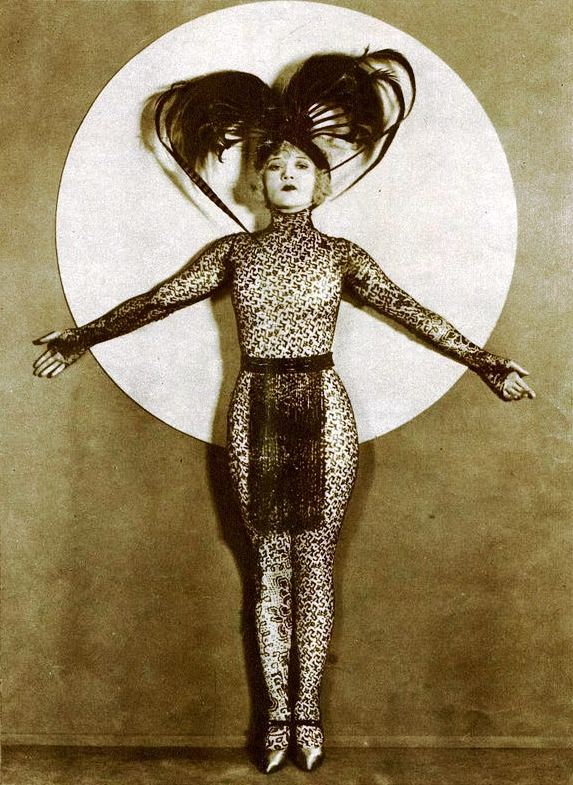
Betty Compson in a film still

The film has a similarity to von Stroheim's Foolish Wives released that same year.

== Plot ==
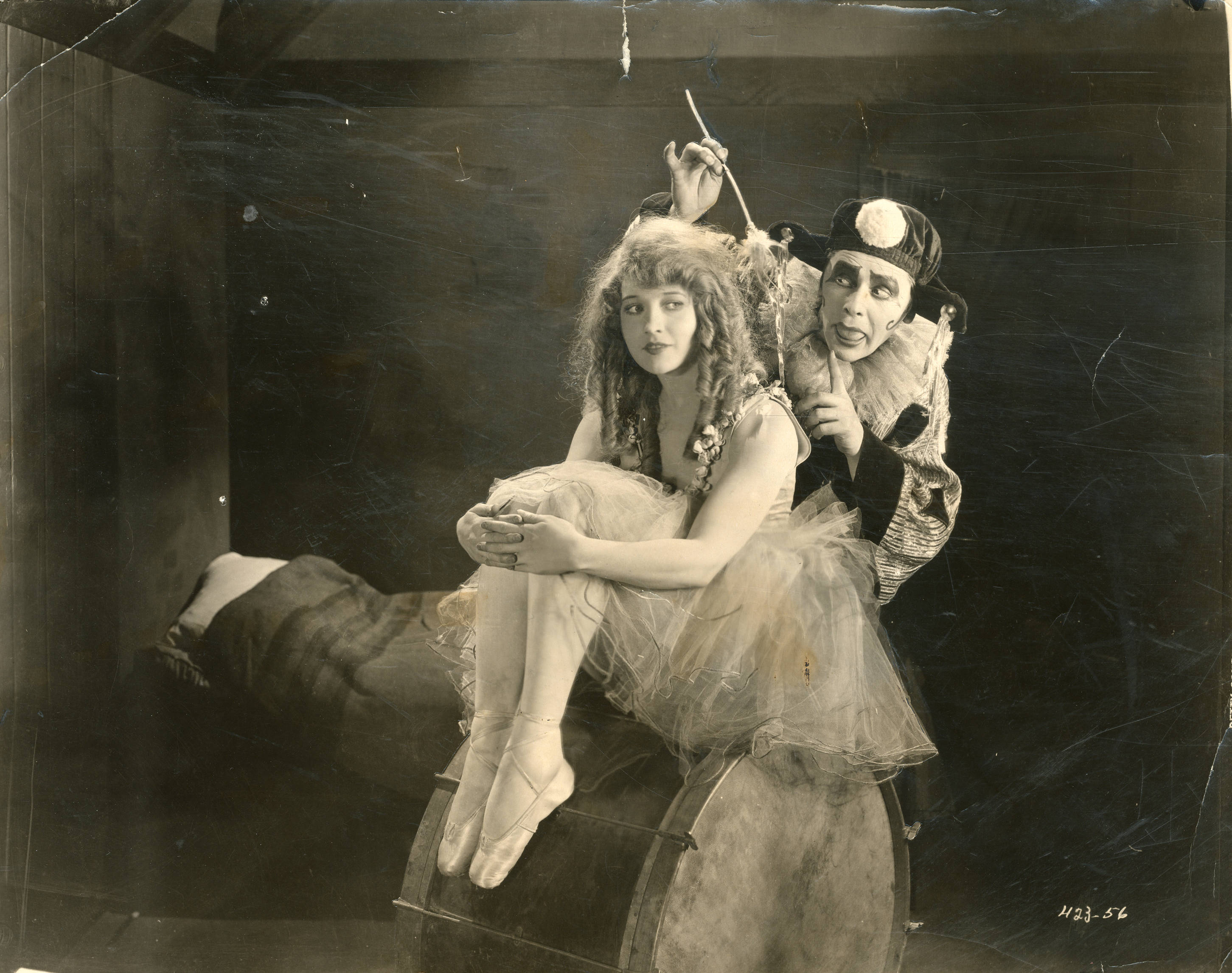
Film still of Compson and Theodore Kosloff

Genelle, a girl who is involved in the Paris criminal underworld. During World War I she becomes a wartime Red Cross nurse and after the war leaves for America for a new start in life. There she meets an old wartime colleague, Gaspard, a criminal who is conniving to steal a valuable jewel called 'The Green Temptation'. Gaspard wants Genelle to help him steal the jewel and when she balks he threatens to reveal her sordid past to her new American friends. John Allenby, Scotland Yard detective, hired to protect the jewel, is sweet on Genelle and kills Gaspard when he tries to steal the jewel.

== Cast ==
- Betty Compson as Genelle / Coralyn / Joan Parker
- Mahlon Hamilton as John Allenby
- Theodore Kosloff as Gaspard
- Neely Edwards as Pitou
- Edmund Burns as Hugh Duyker (credited as Edward Burns)
- Lenore Lynard as Duchesse de Chazarin
- Mary Thurman as Dolly Dunton
- William von Hardenburg as Monsieur Jounet
- Betty Brice as Mrs. Weedon Duyker
- Arthur Hull as Mr. Weedon Duyker

== Production ==
The Green Temptation was released posthumously following the unsolved murder of its director William Desmond Taylor on February 1, 1922.

== Preservation ==
The Green Temptation is currently presumed lost. In February of 2021, the film was cited by the National Film Preservation Board on their Lost U.S. Silent Feature Films list.
