= Theodore Kosloff =

Russian-American ballet dancer (1882–1956)

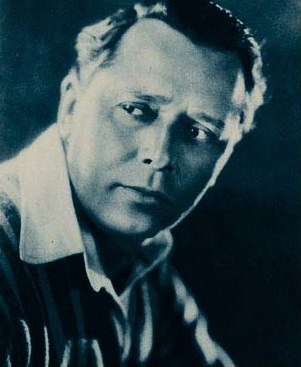
- Kosloff in 1924
- Born: Fyodor Mikhailovich Kozlov; January 22, 1882; Moscow, Russia
- Died: November 22, 1956 (aged 74); Los Angeles, California, U.S.
- Burial place: Valhalla Memorial Park Cemetery
- Other name: Theodor Kosloff
- Occupations: Ballet dancer; choreographer; actor
- Spouse: Maria Baldina (m. 1911–1935)
- Partner(s): Natacha Rambova (1915–1920); Vera Fredova (1916–1934)
- Children: 1

Theodore Kosloff (born Fyodor Mikhailovich Kozlov; Russian: Фёдор Михайлович Козлов; January 22, 1882 – November 22, 1956) was a Russian-born ballet dancer, teacher, choreographer, and actor. Trained in the traditions of Imperial Russian ballet, he emigrated to the United States in the early 20th century and achieved success on the vaudeville stage, where he led his own touring company, the Imperial Russian Ballet.

Kosloff later transitioned into motion pictures, appearing in and contributing to several films directed by Cecil B. DeMille, for whom he also served as a dance and movement specialist. He influenced many performers and designers, most notably his lover Natacha Rambova, who worked closely with him before becoming a major creative figure in silent era cinema.

== Early life and training ==
Born in Moscow on November 22, 1882, Kosloff began studying dance at the age of eight and made his first public appearance ten years later. His training at Moscow's Imperial Theater followed the rigorous apprenticeship system of Russian ballet, requiring years of intensive study. Alongside dance, he studied music and painting on a daily basis; several of his artworks were exhibited in Moscow and St. Petersburg.

== Career ==
=== Dance career in Russia and Europe ===
After graduating in 1901, he began touring internationally with the Diaghilev Ballet Company, which he had joined in 1909. He was a preferred partner of Tamara Karsavina.

He left Russia with a touring company in 1910 and was later discovered in Paris by theatre producer Gertrude Hoffmann, who hired him to choreograph Ballets Russes–inspired dances and perform opposite her. After La Saison Russe, Kosloff choreographed several London revues and maintained close ties with impresario Morris Gest, who played a key role in advancing his career. In 1914, Gest presented a "pantomime ballet," He, He, and She, choreographed by Kosloff at the Princess Theatre in London.

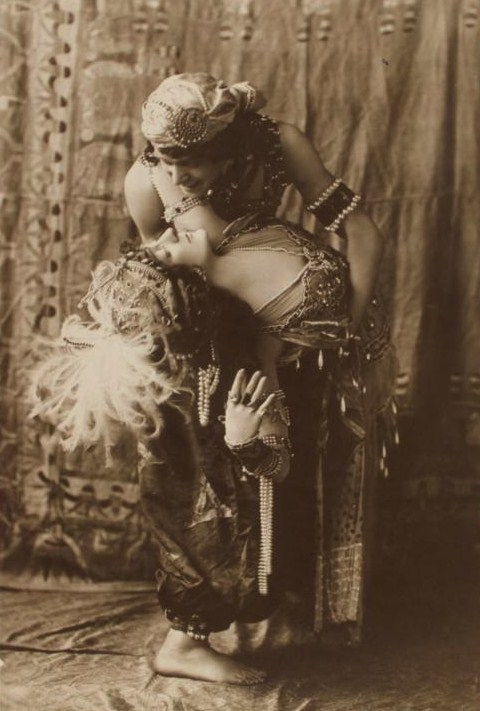
Koloff and Gertrude Hoffmann as the principal dancers in the ballet Scheherazade (1911)

=== Early American tours ===
In June 1911, The New York Times reported on ballet performances at the Winter Garden in New York produced by Hoffmann and staged by Kosloff. Critics noted the exotic appeal and theatrical ambition of the production, viewing it as an early attempt to introduce Russian ballet spectacle to American popular audiences, though less refined than contemporary European ballet companies.

During an American tour in 1911, Kosloff married his dance partner, Maria "Alexandria" Baldina, in San Francisco after learning she was pregnant. Baldina subsequently returned to Europe, where she gave birth to their daughter, Irina, in 1912. That year, while touring Italy, Kosloff’s daughter Irina contracted meningitis, surviving but left permanently disabled. Immigration restrictions prevented Baldina from returning to the United States with a dependent child, and she remained in Bournemouth, England, caring for Irina in a home purchased by Kosloff. Kosloff returned alone to the United States, seeking to reestablish his career.

By December 1912, Kosloff was reported to be the choreographic director of La Saison Russe, preparing a short run of American premieres of operas and ballets for Spring 1913 in New York, in coordination with Morris Gest. The pre-season announcement promised Mussorgsky's Khovanshchina and Boris Godunov, Rimsky-Korsakov's Sadko and The Tsar's Bride, Anton Rubinstein's Demon, Alexander Borodin's Prince Igor and Mikhail Glinka's Ruslan and Lyudmila.

Gest later brought Kosloff to New York in 1915, where Kosloff staged ballets for the operetta Maid in America and choreographed all the dances for The Peasant Girl. He subsequently choreographed several Broadway musicals: The Passing Show of 1915 (1915–1916), A World of Pleasure (1915–1916), and See America First (1916).

=== Imperial Russian Ballet ===
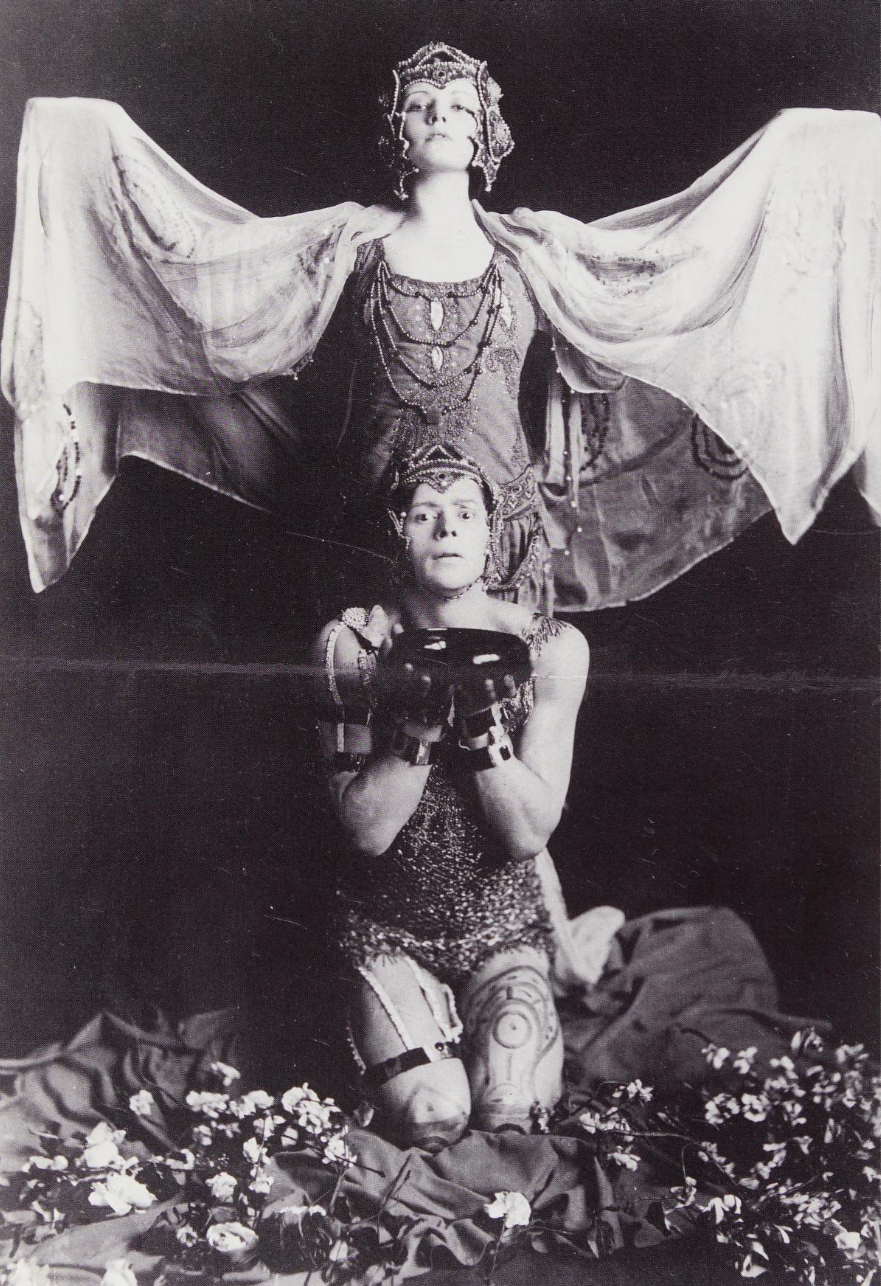
Kosloff and Natacha Rambova in costume, 1916

During this period, a young dancer named Winifred De Wolfe applied to Kosloff's studio in New York, where he accepted her as a pupil. Soon, their professional relationship became romantic, and he encouraged her to adopt the name Vera Fredowa before settling on Natacha Rambova, believing it better suited a Russian imperial persona. When Rambova's mother, Winifred de Wolfe, discovered the relationship, she demanded her daughter return home and sought to have Kosloff deported on statutory rape charges.

Rambova's mother tried to end her daughter's relationship with Kosloff by withholding $2,637 owed for dance lessons and gowns, prompting Kosloff to sue her in April 1916. She offered payment on the condition that he cease contact with Rambova and subsequently attempted to have him arrested and deported on statutory rape charges. In response, Kosloff devised a plan for Rambova cross into Canada and sail to England, where she stayed with his wife in Bournemouth under the guise of serving as a governess to his disabled daughter while the matter was contested. Believing her daughter had been kidnapped, Rambova's mother appealed to American politicians and the Russian ambassador for assistance, promoting a nationwide search. Kosloff denied abducting Rambova and pleaded not guilty to the charges.

During a San Francisco engagement of Kosloff's Imperial Russian Ballet, Rambova's mother agreed to withdraw the charges in exchange for her daughter's return and continued dancing with the company in September 1916. Rambova later became disillusioned after learning that Kosloff had maintained relationships with multiple women during her absence. Former company member Vera Fredova (born Winifred Edwards) later recalled that Kosloff exercised extensive control over the personal and professional lives of women in the company in exchange for promises of career advancement. "It became apparent to all of us that Kosloff would never be faithful to one woman. He was the type of man who could only be happy if he were surrounded by a harem," said Fredova.

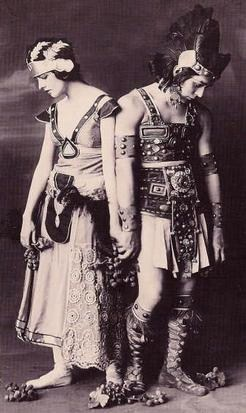
Rambova and Kosloff wearing costumes designed by Rambova for their Aztec dance number on the Keith-Orpheum circuit, 1917

In the summer of 1917, Kosloff, Rambova, and Fredova returned to Los Angeles, where they rented a house and erected a tent in the backyard to serve as a temporary dance school and studio. Kosloff was introduced to Cecil B. DeMille by the actress and writer Jeanie MacPherson. DeMille was encouraged to sign Kosloff due to the persistence of his young niece Agnes de Mille, who was an ardent fan of the ballet dancer. DeMille was immediately impressed by the dark-haired young dancer and quickly put Kosloff to work as an actor. Rambova immersed herself in research on ancient Aztec culture and designed costumes for a film directed by DeMille, while Kosloff prepared for his screen debut. All three also worked as technical advisers to the studio, overseeing choreography and movement for the production. Kosloff's first role was in the film The Woman God Forgot opposite the popular American singer and actress, Geraldine Farrar. Following the film's release, DeMille offered Kosloff and his assistants work on additional projects. Although the offer was financially attractive, the dancers declined, choosing instead to focus on future performances on the Keith-Orpheum circuit.

In September 1917, the Imperial Russian Ballet began its second Los Angeles engagement. The program's highlight was The Aztec Dance, performed by Rambova and Kosloff—wearing his costume from the DeMille film—accompanied by Fredova, Vlasta Maslova, Ivonne Verlainova, and Alex Ivanoff. The performances received strong reviews, which continued as the troupe toured nationally. After 32 weeks on the road, the second tour concluded in New York in the spring of 1918, after which the dancers traveled to Florida for a summer holiday. During this period, the Russian Revolution had a decisive impact on Kosloff's finances. Funds earned from the tours had been invested in a block of apartment buildings in Moscow, which were confiscated by the Bolshevik government. The loss effectively resulted in the financial collapse of the Imperial Russian Ballet.

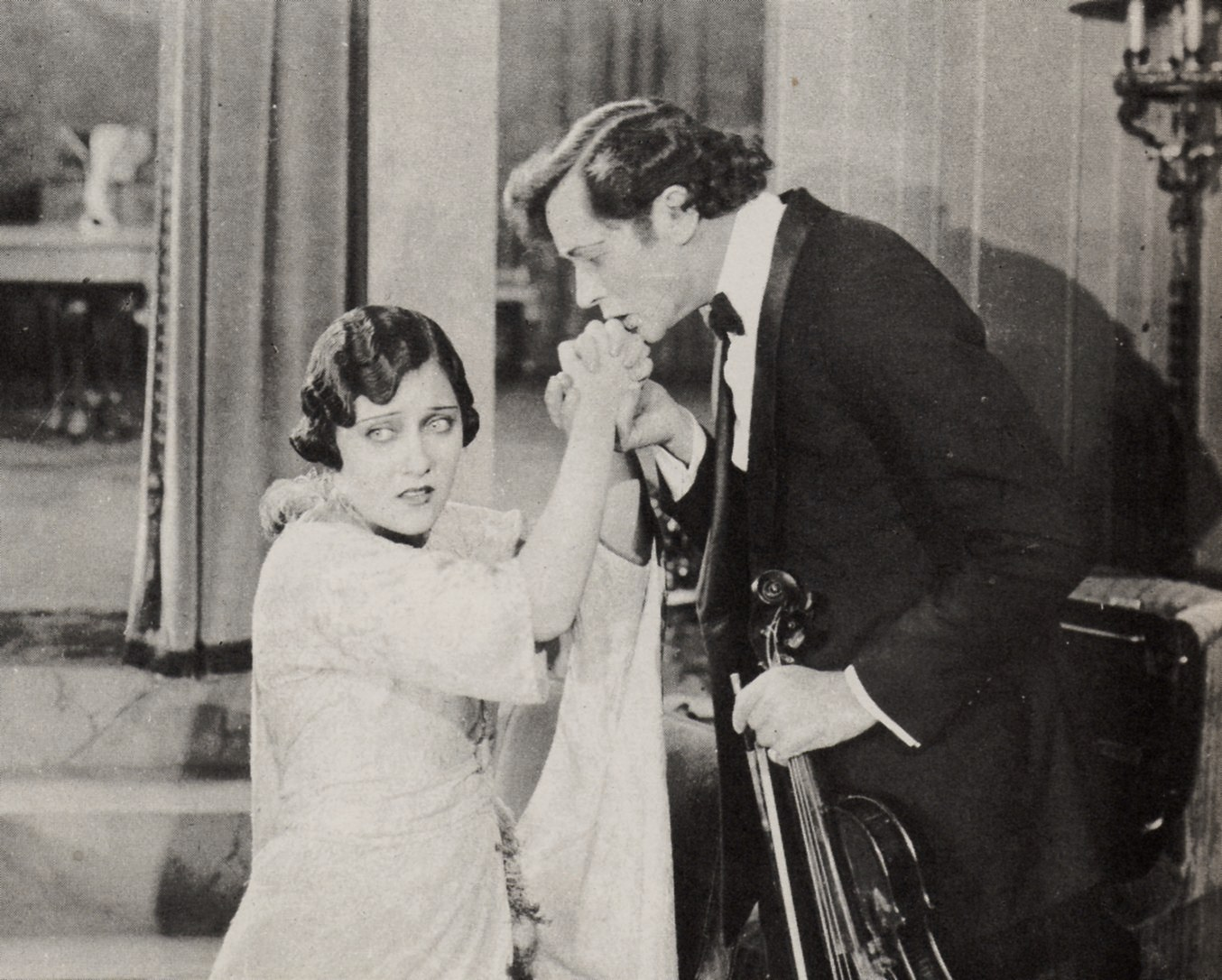
Film still of Gloria Swanson and Kosloff in Why Change Your Wife? (1920)

From 1918 through 1919 Kosloff also appeared on the stage as an actor in the revival of The Awakening. The third and final tour of the Imperial Russian Ballet during the 1918–19 season was well received across the United States. After the tour, he vacationed in San Diego, where he painted landscapes, before opening the Kosloff School of Dance—with Rambova and Fredova as instructors—at Trinity Auditorium in Los Angeles. Among the students who began classes that summer was 14-year-old Agnes de Mille, whom Kosloff admitted free of charge as a courtesy to her uncle, Cecil B. DeMille, and Flower Hujer. In 1920, Kosloff gave dancing lessons to several Hollywood actresses, including Alla Nazimova, Bebe Daniels, Gloria Swanson, May Allison, Bessie Love, Ruth Stonehouse, and Julia Faye.

=== Film career ===
In July 1919, Kosloff signed a two picture deal with Famous Players–Lasky. During his transition into film work, Kosloff relied heavily on the design work of Rambova, who conducted extensive historical research and produced costume and set designs that Kosloff submitted to DeMille as his own. Rambova designed costumes for Kosloff's supporting roles in Why Change Your Wife? and Something to Think About, both released in 1920.

Just as he had done with DeMille, Kosloff submitted Rambova's designs as his own to Nazimova, who took dance lessons from Kosloff in preparation for a role. Rambova's designs appeared in the 1920 film Billions, which also featured students from Kosloff's school as nymphs. Then she began working on Nazimova's film Aphrodite. When Kosloff asked Rambova to present the sketches herself, Nazimova approved the designs and requested revisions, which Rambova did on the spot. As a result, Nazimova offered Rambova a position as art director for her films. Soon after, Rambova planned to move out of Kosloff's Franklin Avenue home while he was away on a hunting trip at DeMille's estate, Paradise. "It wasn't just hunting that was going on up there," remarked Agnes de Mille, adding, "There were girls!" Rambova was aware of this, and she also knew that he was sleeping with two of his underage pupils, which contributed to her decision to leave him. The day she was leaving, Kosloff returned home unexpectedly. He demanded that Rambova unpack, and when she refused, he shot her in the leg with a hunting rifle. She escaped with the help of a Fredova, fleeing through a window and reaching a waiting taxi. Rambova survived the attack, which permanently ended their relationship.

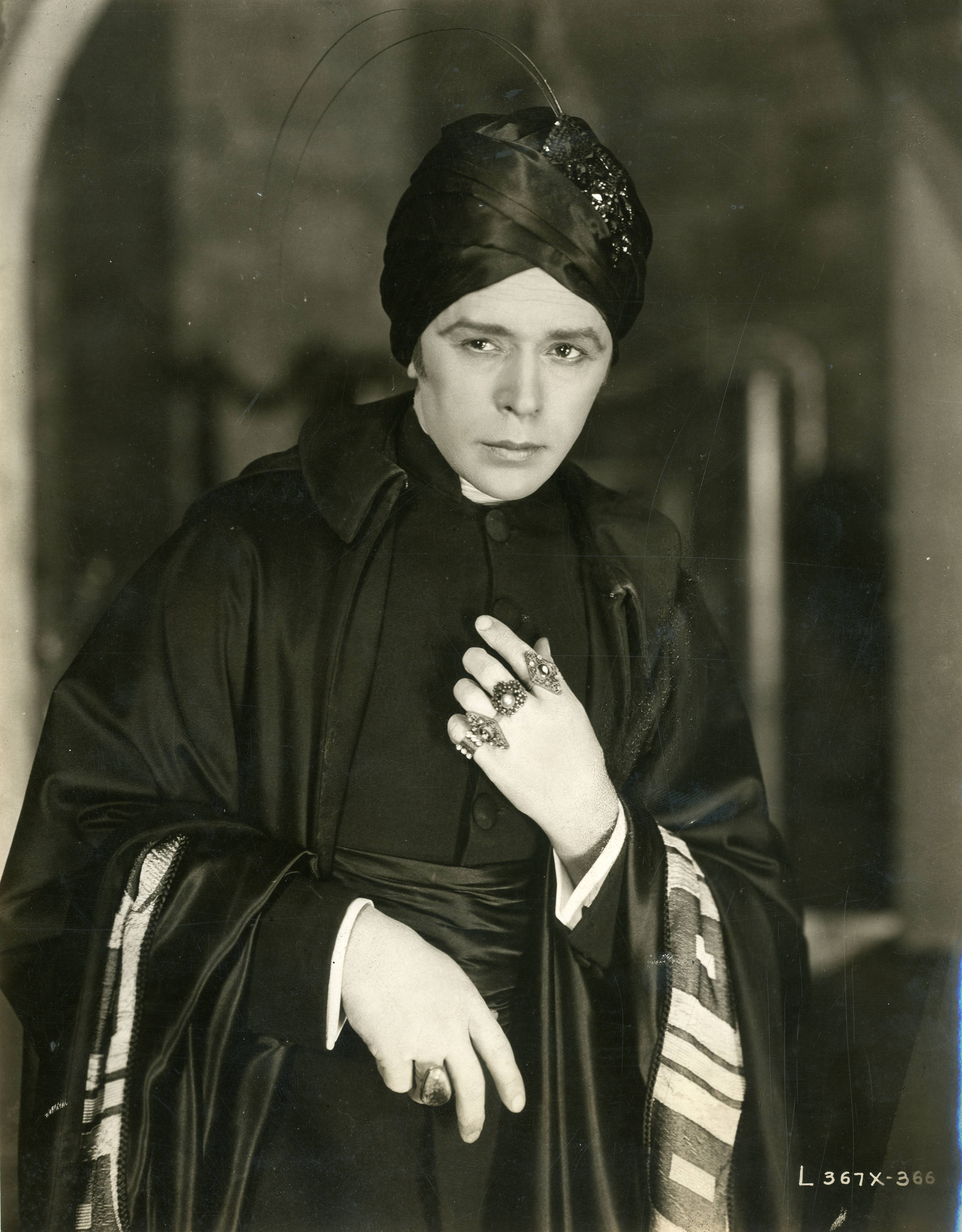
Film still of Kosloff in The Affairs of Anatol (1921)

In 1923, the Los Angeles Times reported that Kosloff had been offered the throne of the Tatars. He traveled to New York City in February of that year, where he saw his brother and fellow dancer Alexis Kosloff and met with representatives of the Liberal party of Kazan. Fearing the resistance of the Conservative party, Kosloff turned down the offer, saying: "I could be Khan, but it is doubtful for how long. And I decided I would rather be a live motion-picture actor than a dead king!"

Kosloff's career as a film actor spanned the 1920s and Kosloff often appeared as the leading man opposite such well renowned actresses as Nita Naldi, Gloria Swanson, Bebe Daniels and Anna Q. Nilsson. With his dark hair and complexion, the ballet dancer was often cast in more exotic roles, often as a "Latin lover" type, Eastern European prince or noble, or Arabic sheik. Kosloff's acting career often relied heavily on DeMille procuring roles for him in his films.

Kosloff's acting career came to an end with the advent of sound film. Studio executives were reluctant to cast him in roles because of his pronounced Russian accent. His last substantial on-screen role was a dance role playing "Electricity" clad in a Futurist costume in the Zeppelin dance scene of De Mille's MGM movie-musical flop Madam Satan. Kosloff's last film role was an uncredited role as a dance instructor in the 1937 Gregory La Cava directed Stage Door, opposite Ginger Rogers, Katharine Hepburn and Adolphe Menjou.

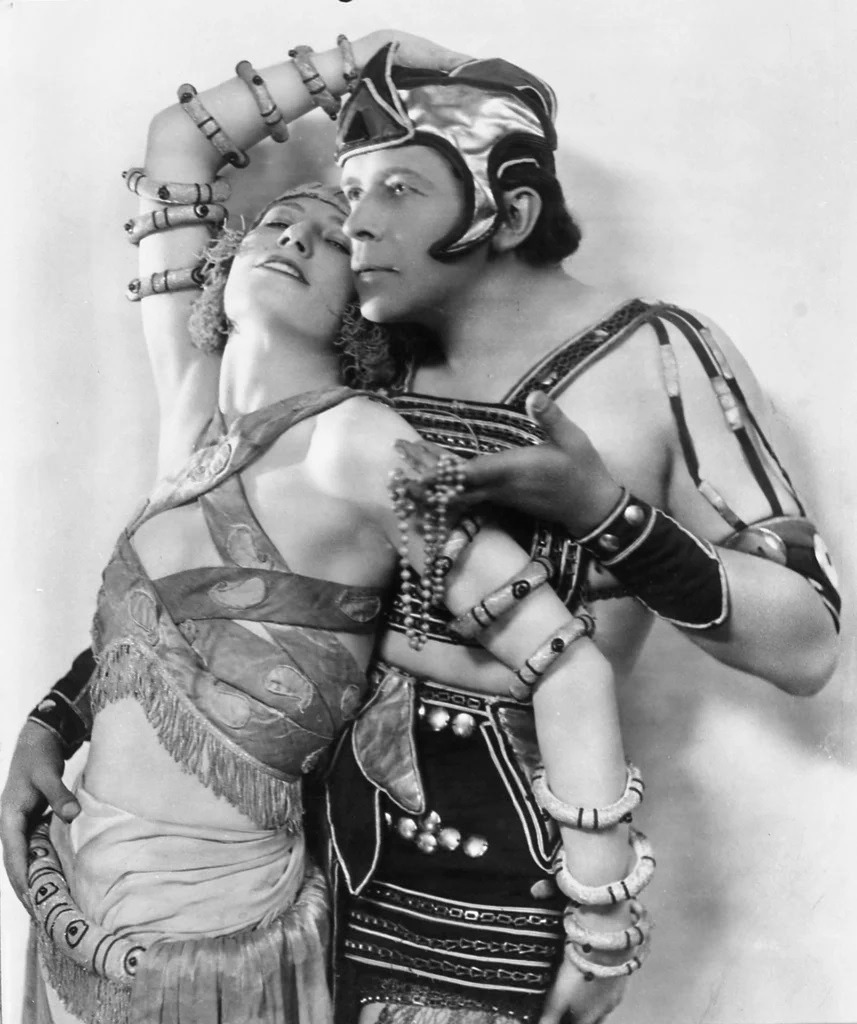
Vera Fredowa and Kosloff in costume, 1926

=== Later years ===
After retiring from acting, Kosloff continued to work as a choreographer and opened successful ballet schools in Los Angeles, San Francisco, and Dallas. He also taught summer courses in Houston.

In August 1934, Kosloff's estranged wife, Maria "Alexandria" Baldina, filed for divorce. In her complaint, she alleged that Kosloff surrounded himself with female secretaries, some of whom he brought into his home to live. The suit named two women, Vera Fredova and another identified only as "Kosloff's Flower," whom he had begun teaching when she was eight years old. Baldwin was granted a divorce in January 1935; the court approved a property settlement providing her with $100 per month for her invalid daughter.

He later worked with 12-year-old Anya Linden (born Ann Eltenton), and encouraged her to change her name. Since 1917, he was a consultant for motion picture producers like Cecil B. DeMille, and one of the last movies he was involved with was, up until his death The Ten Commandments.

== Death ==
On Thanksgiving morning, November 22, 1956, Theodore Kosloff was taken to Good Samaritan Hospital where he died at the age of 74. The mortuary report indicated he had one survivor, Alexis Kosloff of Woodstock, New York. He was interred at Valhalla Memorial Park Cemetery in North Hollywood.

His estate, valued at approximately $250,000, became the subject of prolonged legal disputes after two wills were ruled invalid. A court-approved settlement ultimately divided the estate among several heirs, including two of his sisters living in Russia, who were awarded a combined 12½ percent share, as Soviet law prevented American residents from inheriting Russian property. The settlement also granted 6½ percent to Kosloff's former wife, Alexandra Baldina, who had claimed additional rights following their divorce. A nephew, Alexis Kosloff Jr., received one-quarter of the estate, while the remainder went to Eva Russo, a teacher at Kosloff's Hollywood ballet school, with portions allocated to Winifred Edwards (also known as Vera Fredova) and Flower Wilkinson Hujer.

== Legacy ==
For his contribution to the motion picture industry, Kosloff was given a star on the Hollywood Walk of Fame located at 1617 Vine Street, in Hollywood, California.

== Partial filmography ==
- The Woman God Forgot (1917) - Guatemoco
- The Tree of Knowledge (1920) - Adam
- Why Change Your Wife? (1920) - Radinoff
- The City of Masks (1920) - Bosky
- The Prince Chap (1920) - Yadder
- Something to Think About (1920) - Clown
- Forbidden Fruit (1921) - Pietro Giuseppe
- The Affairs of Anatol (1921) - Mr. Nazzer Singh - Hindu Hypnotist
- Fool's Paradise (1921) - John Roderiguez
- The Lane That Had No Turning (1922) - Louis Racine
- The Green Temptation (1922) - Gaspard
- The Dictator (1922) - Carlos Rivas
- To Have and to Hold (1922) - Lord Carnal
- Law of the Lawless (1923) - Sender
- Children of Jazz (1923) - Richard Forestall
- Hollywood (1923) - Theodore Kosloff
- Adam's Rib (1923) - Jaromir XIII - Deposed King of Morania
- Don't Call It Love (1923) - Luigi Busini
- Triumph (1924) - Varinoff
- Feet of Clay (1924) - Bendick
- The Golden Bed (1925) - Marquis de San Pilar
- New Lives for Old (1925) - De Montinbard
- Beggar on Horseback (1925) - Prince in Pantomime
- The Volga Boatman (1926) - Stefan, A Blacksmith
- The Little Adventuress (1927) - Antonio Russo
- The King of Kings (1927) - Malchus - Captain of the High Priest's Guards
- Woman Wise (1928) - Abdul Mustapha
- Madam Satan (1930) - Electricity
- Stage Door (1937) - Dance Instructor (uncredited) (final film role)

== See also ==
- List of Russian ballet dancers
