= The Woman God Forgot =

1917 film

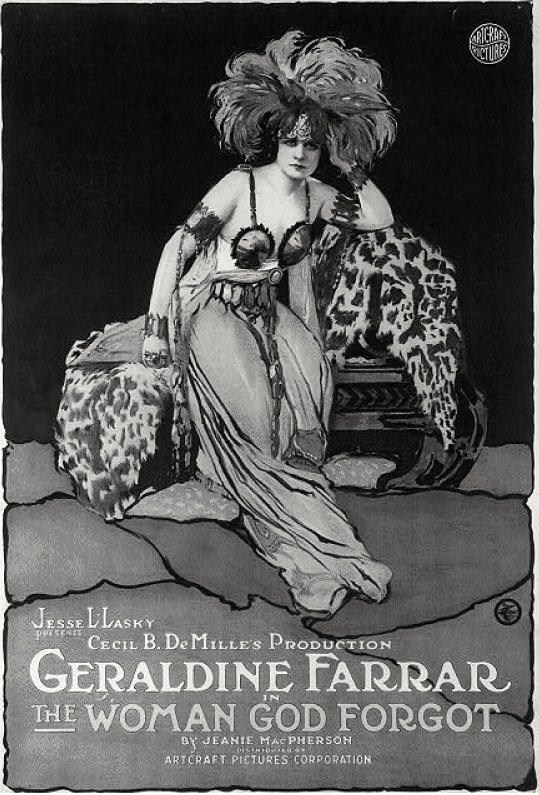
- Lobby poster
- Directed by: Cecil B. DeMille; Cullen Tate (asst. director)
- Written by: William C. de Mille; Jeanie MacPherson
- Produced by: Cecil B. DeMille; Jesse L. Lasky
- Starring: Geraldine Farrar; Wallace Reid
- Cinematography: Charles Schoenbaum; Alvin Wyckoff
- Edited by: Cecil B. DeMille
- Production company: Famous Players–Lasky/Artcraft
- Distributed by: Artcraft Pictures Corp.
- Release date: October 28, 1917
- Running time: 60 minutes
- Country: United States
- Language: Silent (English intertitles)

The Woman God Forgot is a 1917 American silent romance film directed by Cecil B. DeMille and starring Geraldine Farrar. Art direction for the film was done by Wilfred Buckland.

Location shooting for the film took place in Santa Monica, California and Yosemite National Park.

== Plot ==
The Woman God Forgot (1917)

The Exhibitors Herald, a trade magazine for independent cinemas, provides a description of the film. Moctezuma, the Aztec king, resents the intrusion of the Spanish who have come to convert the Aztecs to Christianity. But Tecza, daughter of the king, loves Alvarado, one of the Spanish captains, and she allows the Spanish soldiers to enter the palace. After a terrific battle, she is the only surviving Aztec and the Spanish allow her to depart in peace. Alvarado then comes wooing the last of the Aztecs and wins her.

== Cast ==
- Wallace Reid as Alvarado
- Raymond Hatton as Moctezuma
- Hobart Bosworth as Cortez
- Theodore Kosloff as Guatemoco
- Walter Long as Taloc (High Priest)
- Julia Faye as Tecza's handmaiden
- Olga Grey as Aztec woman
- Geraldine Farrar as Tecza (daughter of Moctezuma)
- Charley Rogers as Cacamo (as Charles Rogers)
- Ramon Novarro as Aztec man (uncredited)
- Louis Weinberg a.k.a. David Marvel as Indian Prince (vaudeville dancer)

== Production ==
Several elaborate set pieces were used for this Mesoamerican epic, but the largest is the Aztec pyramid they constructed into the side of a hill at Inceville, in Santa Monica, CA. According to John Gilbert, who was working in Hollywood as an extra at the time, it was constructed of wood layered over with paper, then textured with sand to give it the appearance of stonework.

Toward the end of the picture several actors are seen tumbling down the side of the pyramid in the battle between the Aztecs and the Spanish conquistadors. Gilbert said that "the extras were thrown down the sides of the pyramid and a man stood at the bottom with a bucket of iodine and patched them up" to treat their sandpapered skin.

== Reception ==
A contemporaneous review in The Moving Picture World stated that the historical accuracy of the sets and costumes made a strong appeal to students of history, while the abbreviated tale of the destruction of the highest pre-European civilization in the New World would prove absorbing to the casual amusement seeker. The performance of the actors received universal acclaim, but the highest praise was saved for Geraldine Farrar: "The cast fitted their parts, but the star, Geraldine Farrar, was born for hers."

A staff writer for The New York Times referred to the film as "a colorful and magnificently mounted romance"; however, they believed its plot was "somewhat primitive".

== Preservation ==
Complete 35 mm prints of The Woman God Forgot are held by the George Eastman Museum and the Cineteca Del Friuli in Gemona.
