= Hit the Deck =

Hit the Deck can refer to:

- Hit the Deck (musical), a 1927 musical, and the films based on it:
  - Hit the Deck (1930 film), a musical
  - Hit the Deck (1955 film), a musical
