= Spring Cleaning (play) =

1923 comedy play by the British writer Frederick Lonsdale

Spring Cleaning is a 1923 comedy play by the British writer Frederick Lonsdale. A man becomes convinced his wife is about to have an affair, and in order to shock her he hires a prostitute to come and live in their house. It premiered at the Eltinge Theatre in New York City on 9 November 1923 and at St Martin's Theatre in the West End on 19 January 1925.

In 1932 the play was adapted into a British film Women Who Play directed by Arthur Rosson and starring Mary Newcomb, Benita Hume and George Barraud. The film generally followed the play with certain changes, largely due to censorship issues such as the prostitute being replaced by an actress.

== See also ==
- The Fast Set (1924)
