= Kid Dynamite (film) =

1943 film by Wallace Fox

- Astor Pictures re-release film poster
- Directed by: Wallace Fox
- Written by: Gerald Schnitzer (screenplay); Morey Amsterdam (additional dialogue)
- Based on: The Old Gang by Paul Ernst
- Produced by: Jack Dietz; Sam Katzman
- Starring: East Side Kids
- Cinematography: Mack Stengler
- Edited by: Carl Pierson
- Music by: Edward J. Kay
- Production company: Monogram Pictures
- Release date: February 5, 1943 (U.S.)
- Running time: 66 minutes
- Country: United States
- Language: English

Kid Dynamite is a 1943 American film directed by Wallace Fox and starring the East Side Kids. It was based on the 1942 short story The Old Gang by Paul Ernst and features additional dialogue by comedian Morey Amsterdam. The working title of this film was Little Mobsters.

== Plot ==
Muggs McGinnis practices for his boxing match the next night. In order to raise money, Muggs and the gang go to Nick's pool hall and challenge hall regular Harry Wycoff to a game of pool. Muggs has pre-arranged with gang member Danny to use special trick chalk for the pool cue so that Wycoff will lose, but Danny is so convinced of Muggs's talent that he does not use the chalk, and Muggs loses the match. When Wycoff insists that Muggs pay off his wager, Muggs hits him in the stomach and leaves without paying.

Seeking revenge, Wycoff plots with bookie Tony to eliminate Muggs from the boxing match. The night of the match, Muggs is abducted by a man pretending to be a reporter, who holds him hostage in the back of a car for the duration of the fight. When Muggs does not show up for the match, Danny goes into the ring so that the East Side Kids will not be disqualified. Although Danny is out of shape, he surprises everyone by winning the match.

After Muggs is released, he takes the championship belt from Danny and accuses him of arranging the kidnapping. Muggs continues to harass Danny after he learns that Danny has gotten a job at a garage where he had hoped to work, and that Danny has been dating his sister Ivy. When Danny learns about Wycoff's involvement in Muggs' kidnapping, he tries to tell Muggs, but Muggs ostracizes him from the club. Muggs learns from Scruno's father Jackson that Wycoff works for Tony, who is also Jackson's boss, and the East Side Kids start a brawl with Tony and his thugs. The Kids are arrested for disturbing the peace, but the judge releases them without a sentence, and gives Tony and his pals six-months jail time for bookmaking.

Later, Danny and Ivy compete in a jitterbug contest, but Muggs and his date are declared the winners until the judge discovers that Muggs' partner is a professional dancer. Muggs is disqualified, and the fifty-dollar prize is awarded to Danny and Ivy. Danny reluctantly turns the money over to Muggs after he threatens him. Danny's boss, Louis Gendick, a father figure, advises Danny that he has outgrown boys like Muggs, and that he should enlist in the Army. Danny's mother consents to his enlistment, and he leaves for training camp.

Muggs, meanwhile, is moved to enlist when he sees headlines announcing the Nazis' destruction of the entire Czechoslovak village of Lidice. Muggs' mother refuses to consent because he appears to be enlisting out of competition with Danny. When Danny returns on leave from training, he proposes to Ivy. Muggs tells Danny that he can still be a member of the gang if he helps them steal tires from Gendick, but Danny now refuses to take orders from Muggs. Danny bests Muggs in a fistfight, which alleviates the tensions between the two old friends. Muggs, who always vowed that the man who married his sister would have to beat him first, now renews his friendship with Danny, and he and Glimpy join the service.

== Cast ==
=== The East Side Kids ===
- Leo Gorcey as Ethelbert "Muggs" McGinnis
- Huntz Hall as Glimpy McGleavey
- Bobby Jordan as Danny Lyons
- Benny Bartlett as Benny 'Beanie' Miller
- Sunshine Sammy as Scruno Jackson
- Bobby Stone as Harold "Stoney" Stone
- David Durand as Joe "Skinny" Collins

=== Additional Cast ===
- Gabriel Dell as Harry Wycoff
- Pamela Blake as Ivy McGinnis
- Vince Barnett as Klinkhammer
- Daphne Pollard as Mrs. McGinnis
- Charles Judels as Nick, pool hall owner
- Dudley Dickerson as Mr. Jackson, Scruno's father
- Henry Hall as Louis Gendick
- Minerva Urecal as Judge
- Wheeler Oakman as Tony, bookie
- Marguerita Padula as Mrs. Lyons
- Jack Mulhall as Clancy, second abductor
- Kay Marvis as Kay, Muggs' dance partner
- Ray Miller as Ray, first abductor
- Mike Riley's Orchestra as themselves
- Marion Miller as singer at dance contest
- Snub Pollard as dance official

== Soundtrack ==
- Mike Riley's Orchestra and Marion Miller - "Comin' Thro' the Rye" (Traditional Scottish music, Words by Robert Burns)
