= The Marriage Bond (1932 film) =

1932 film

- Feature on the film in Picture Show (3 September 1932)
- Directed by: Maurice Elvey
- Written by: Harry Fowler Mear; Muriel Stewart
- Produced by: Julius Hagen
- Starring: Mary Newcomb; Guy Newall; Stewart Rome
- Cinematography: Basil Emmott
- Production company: Julius Hagen Productions
- Distributed by: RKO Pictures
- Release date: 29 August 1932
- Running time: 82 minutes
- Country: United Kingdom
- Language: English

The Marriage Bond is a 1932 British drama film directed by Maurice Elvey and starring Mary Newcomb, Guy Newall and Stewart Rome. It was written by Harry Fowler Mear and Muriel Stewart, and was made by Twickenham Film Studios.

== Plot summary ==
Toby Heron turns up blind drunk at a hunt ball, disgusting his daughter Binnie. Later, he feels packs his bags and retreats to a secluded countryside cottage. His wife Jacqueline still loves him and visits the cottage to see him. However, when she arrives and find him in the company of the local barmaid, she feels betrayed and turns to her own admirer, Sir Paul Swaythling, for comfort. When Binnie gets married and moves out, Toby comes back home. Despite everything, Jacqueline is unable to walk away from her husband, and decides to look after him for good.

== Cast ==
- Mary Newcomb as Jacqueline Heron
- Guy Newall as Toby Heron
- Stewart Rome as Sir Paul Swaythling
- Ann Casson as Binnie Heron
- Florence Desmond as Elsie
- Denys Blakelock as Alfred Dreisler
- Lewis Shaw as Frere Heron
- Humberston Wright as Jenkins
- Amy Veness as Mrs Crust

== Reception ==
Film Weekly wrote: "'Should a wife remain with a husband who is a drunkard and a weakling?' Is the question asked by The Marriage Bond. The answer is reached only after a long succession of tedious scenes, involving a great deal of dialogue and getting nowhere."

Kine Weekly wrote: "Charming English scenery and first-class acting are features of this iong-drawn-out triangle drama ... Audiences, particularly feminine ones, however, will probably appreciate the considerable emotional pull. ... Mary Newcomb brings brains and beauty to the emotional role of the sorely-tried wife. Guy Newall puts up an amazingly good show as the drunkard, whilst Ann Carson provides a clean-cut portrait of an offensively modern damsel. ... Maurice Elvey has adhered to a stage technique, and except for some opening shots of a hunt relies very much on dialogue. He has worked in some good emotional scenes, however."

Picturegoer wrote: "A slight and drawn-out triangle drama is redeemed to some extent by the good acting of a cast which includes both old favourites and newcomers to the screen. ... It is a pity, indeed, that the story is not stronger and has to rely so much on dialogue."

Picture Show wrote: "Sincerely acted and directed with understanding."
