= Women Who Play =

1932 film

- film poster from cinema programme
- Directed by: Arthur Rosson
- Screenplay by: Frederick Lonsdale (play); Basil Mason; Gilbert Wakefield
- Produced by: Walter Morosco; Alexander Korda (uncredited)
- Starring: Mary Newcomb; Benita Hume; George Barraud
- Cinematography: Philip Tannura
- Production company: Paramount British Pictures
- Distributed by: Paramount British Pictures
- Release date: March 1932 (U.K.)
- Running time: 78 minutes
- Country: United Kingdom
- Language: English
- Budget: $105,000

Women Who Play is a 1932 British comedy film directed by Arthur Rosson and starring Mary Newcomb, Benita Hume and George Barraud. It was produced by Walter Morosco and Alexander Korda and has a screenplay by Basil Mason and Gilbert Wakefield. It is based on the 1925 play Spring Cleaning by Frederick Lonsdale.

== Premise ==
In order to deter his wife from having an affair a man hires an actress as part of an elaborate scheme.

== Cast ==
- Mary Newcomb as Mona
- Benita Hume as Margaret Sones
- George Barraud as Richard Sones
- Joan Barry as Fay
- Barry Jones as Ernest Steele
- Edmund Breon as Rachie Wells
- Gerald Lyle as Bobby
- Sylvia Leslie as Lady Jane
- Evan Thomas as Willie

== Production ==
Women Who Play was filmed at British and Dominion Studios, Elstree, in Hertfordshire, England for Paramount British Pictures.

== See also ==
- The Fast Set (1924)
