= The Passionate Pilgrim (1921 film) =

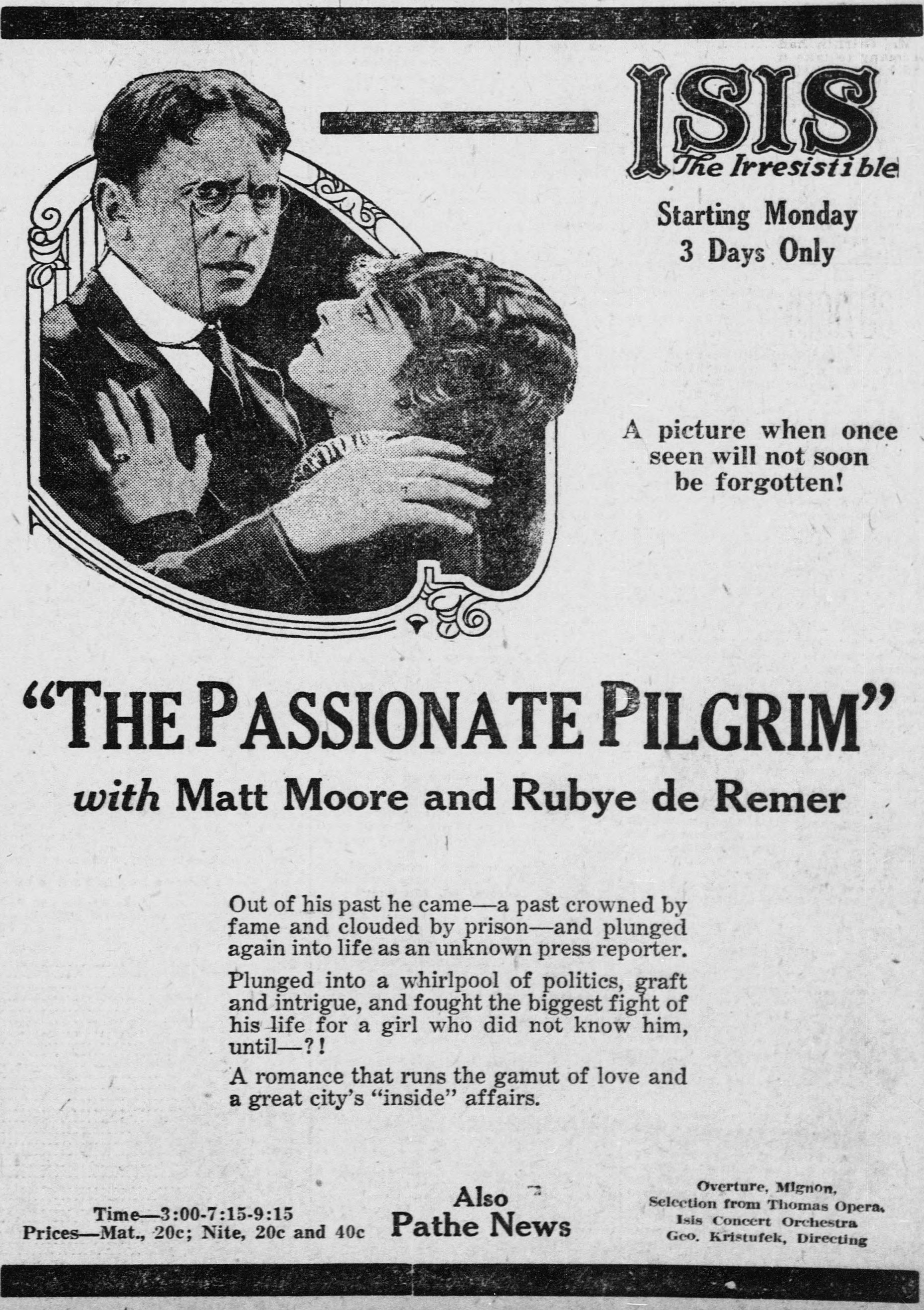
- Newspaper advertisement
- Directed by: Robert G. Vignola
- Screenplay by: Samuel Merwin; George DuBois Proctor
- Starring: Matt Moore; Mary Newcomb; Julia Swayne Gordon; Tom Guise; Frankie Mann; Rubye De Remer; Claire Whitney
- Cinematography: Al Liguori
- Production company: Cosmopolitan Productions
- Distributed by: Paramount Pictures
- Release date: January 2, 1921
- Running time: 70 minutes
- Country: United States
- Language: English

The Passionate Pilgrim is a 1921 American drama silent film directed by Robert G. Vignola and written by Samuel Merwin and George DuBois Proctor. The film stars Matt Moore, Mary Newcomb, Julia Swayne Gordon, Tom Guise, Frankie Mann, Rubye De Remer and Claire Whitney. The film was released on January 2, 1921, by Paramount Pictures.

== Plot ==
The character of Henry Calverly goes to prison in order to protect his mother who killed her husband.

== Cast ==
- Matt Moore as Henry Calverly
- Mary Newcomb as Cecily
- Julia Swayne Gordon as Madame Watt
- Tom Guise as Senator Watt
- Frankie Mann as Marjorie Daw
- Rubye De Remer as Miriam Calverly
- Claire Whitney as Esther
- Van Dyke Brooke as Hitt
- Charles K. Gerrard as Qualters
- Sam J. Ryan as Major McIntyre
- Arthur Donaldson as O'Rell
- Albert Roccardi as Amme
- Bernard A. Reinold as Listerly
- Charles Brook as Trent
- Helen Lindroth as Nurse Russell

== Preservation status ==
An incomplete print survives in the Library of Congress collection.
