= Frail Women =

1932 film

- Feature article on the film from Picture Show (4 June 1932)
- Directed by: Maurice Elvey
- Written by: Michael Barringer
- Produced by: Julius Hagen
- Starring: Mary Newcomb; Owen Nares; Edmund Gwenn
- Cinematography: Basil Emmott; William Luff
- Edited by: Jack Harris; Lister Laurance
- Music by: W.L. Trytel
- Production company: Real Art Productions
- Distributed by: RKO Pictures
- Release date: 23 May 1932
- Running time: 72 minutes
- Country: United Kingdom
- Language: English

Frail Women is a 1932 British drama film directed by Maurice Elvey and starring Mary Newcomb, Owen Nares, Frank Pettingell and Herbert Lomas. It was written by MIchael Barringer and made at Twickenham Studios with sets designed by James A. Carter. In the years after the First World War, a Colonel marries his war-time mistress in order to legitimise their daughter.

== Plot ==
During the First World War, Lilian Hamilton has a brief relationship with an army officer, Colonel Leonard Harvey. Their affair results in an illegitimate child, Mary, but the Colonel leaves for the front and Lilian is forced to give the baby up. The child is later adopted by a wealthy woman, separating mother and daughter.

Years later, after the adoptive mother dies, Mary learns about her origins. She eventually makes contact with Lilian, who is now the kept mistress of a bookmaker. Despite her mother's hard and brassy personality, Mary begins to understand Lilian's circumstances and the stigma she faced as an unmarried mother.

Mary falls in love with a respectable young man from a higher social class, but she worries that her illegitimate birth and family background will damage his reputation and future. It is revealed that the superior of the young man's employer is Colonel Harvey, the officer who had the wartime affair with Lilian and is Mary's biological father. The Colonel is a decent man and does what he can to remedy the situation, by marrying Lilian and legitimising Mary.

== Cast ==
- Mary Newcomb as The Woman (Lilian Hamilton)
- Owen Nares as The Man (Colonel Leonard Harvey)
- Margaret Vines as The Girl (Mary Willis)
- Frederick Peisley as The Boy (Peter Farrer)
- Jane Welsh as The Sister (Eleanor Farrer)
- Herbert Lomas as The Solicitor (Burrows)
- Edmund Gwenn as The Bookmaker (Jim Willis)
- Athole Stewart as The Father (Sir Robert Farrer)
- Frank Pettingell as The Employer (McWhirter)
- Miles Malleson as The Registrar
- Heather Angel as The Girl (uncredited)

== Reception ==
Film Weekly wrote: "The direction is competent without being in any way distinguished, and the scenario adheres too closely to stage conventions. But many touches of real drama and genuine emotion are achieved through the fine work of the players."

Kine Weekly wrote: "Heavy social drama, which takes for its subject the unhappy plight of the illegitimate child. The problem is treated with dramatic skill by Maurice Elvey and his experienced cast, and, although it is impossible to avoid the obvious, there remains much to interest and provide food for thought. This picture, which is provocative rather than entertaining, should appeal to all who can appreciate good acting. "
