= Hubert Osborne =

Canadian-American playwright and screenwriter (1881–1958)

Hubert Benjamin Osborne (1881–1958) was a Canadian-born playwright and screenwriter who worked in the US. Although he created many adaptations of Shakespeare's works, he was best known for his light comedies.

== Early life ==
He was born in Kingston, Ontario, and attended Queen's University for two years before progressing to Harvard University. He later worked as professor of drama at the Carnegie Institute of Technology until 1925, and then at Yale University until 1928.

== Career ==
Osborne also worked at several American theaters and scripted films as well as Broadway and off-Broadway shows. In 1928 his play Eve's Complaint was produced in Paris. This was the first so-called "American play" to have a Paris premiere. Osborne also worked on Broadway during this period. He wrote The Good Men Do (1917), April (1918), Shore Leave (1922), Rita Coventry (1923) and The Blue Bandanna (1924). His most successful works were light comedies.

Osborne also created a pioneering synthetic stage lighting system, which was used in productions of Shakespeare, with whose work he had a particular fascination. His play The Good Men Do was about a meeting between Anne Hathaway and Anne Whateley, an earlier fiancée of the playwright's. He also co-wrote The Shakespeare Play: A Drama in Rhythmic Prose (c.1911), about Shakespeare's life, but this was never produced on Broadway. In addition he created many adaptations of Shakespeare's works.

Osborne was also credited in a number of film adaptations of his plays, including Don't Call It Love (1923) (based on the play Rita Coventry); Hit the Deck (1930) (play Shore Leave); Follow the Fleet (1936) (also based on Shore Leave); Strange Experiment (1937) (play Two Worlds).

== Filmography ==
- Don't Call It Love, directed by William C. deMille (1923, based on the play Rita Coventry)
- Shore Leave, directed by John S. Robertson (1925, based on the play Shore Leave)
- Hit the Deck, directed by Luther Reed (1930, based on the musical Hit the Deck)
- Follow the Fleet, directed by Mark Sandrich (1936, based on the play Shore Leave)
- Strange Experiment, directed by Albert Parker (UK, 1937, based on the play Two Worlds)
- Hit the Deck, directed by Roy Rowland (1955, based on the musical Hit the Deck)
