= The Fast Set =

1924 film by William C. deMille

- Adolphe Menjou and Betty Compson
- Directed by: William C. deMille
- Written by: Clara Beranger (scenario)
- Based on: Spring Cleaning by Frederick Lonsdale
- Produced by: Adolph Zukor; Jesse Lasky
- Starring: Betty Compson; Adolphe Menjou
- Cinematography: L. Guy Wilky
- Distributed by: Paramount Pictures
- Release date: October 20, 1924
- Running time: 80 minutes
- Country: United States
- Language: Silent (English intertitles)

The Fast Set is a 1924 American silent comedy-drama film directed by William C. deMille and starring Betty Compson. The film is based on the 1923 Broadway play, Spring Cleaning, by Frederick Lonsdale.

== Plot ==
As described in a review in a film magazine, Richard Sones, novelist, prefers the company of intellectuals, while his wife Margaret prefers a fast set. Differences in tastes and a lack of understanding of each begin to alienate them, and Ernest Steele, leader of the fast set, hastens the crisis by having sex with Margaret. As an object lesson to his wife, Richard brings Mona, a woman of the streets, to his wife's dinner party and tells the guests that her presence should not be resented as she is a professional in the same game they play as amateurs. Margaret decides upon a divorce until she learns that Steele is not eager to marry her. Steele then takes a hand, convincing Richard that he has been too inattentive and showing him how to win back his wife, who really loves him.

== Cast ==
- Betty Compson as Margaret Sones
- Adolphe Menjou as Ernest Steele
- Elliott Dexter as Richard Sones
- ZaSu Pitts as Mona
- Dawn O'Day as Little Margaret Sones
- Grace Carlyle as Jane Walton
- Claire Adams as Fay Collen
- Rosalind Byrne as Connie Gallies
- Edgar Norton as Archie Wells
- Louis Natheaux as Billy Sommers
- Eugenio de Liguoro as Walters
- Fred Walton as Simpson
- Christina Montt (uncredited)

== Preservation ==
The Fast Set is currently presumed lost. In February of 2021, the film was cited by the National Film Preservation Board on their Lost U.S. Silent Feature Films list.

== See also ==
- Women Who Play (1932)
