= Strange Experiment =

1937 film

- Opening titles
- Directed by: Albert Parker
- Written by: Edward Dryhurst
- Based on: Two Worlds by John Golden and Hubert Osborne, "with acknowledgements to the novel by Magic Man by Hubert Osborne and Hallie Ermine Rives Wheeler"
- Produced by: John Findlay
- Starring: Donald Gray; Ann Wemyss; Mary Newcomb
- Cinematography: Ronald Neame
- Edited by: Peter Tanner
- Music by: Charles Cowlrick
- Production company: 20th Century Fox
- Distributed by: 20th Century Fox
- Release date: 19 January 1937
- Running time: 74 minutes
- Country: United Kingdom
- Language: English

Strange Experiment is a 1937 British drama film directed by Albert Parker and starring Donald Gray, Ann Wemyss and Mary Newcomb. It was written Edward Dryhurst, adapted from the play Two Worlds by John Golden and Hubert Osborne, and was made at Wembley Studios as a quota quickie by the British subsidiary of Fox Film.

== Plot ==
When young chemist James Martin is framed for a jewel robbery, he turns to his aunt, a well-known criminal herself, for help. She agrees, but only if he helps her to steal a secret pearl-making formula from scientist Professor Bauer. James reluctantly participates, but the robbery goes wrong, and he is knocked unconscious. Instead of calling the police, Bauer’s friend Dr Rollins, a brain specialist, decides to use the unconscious James as a test subject for a radical medical theory he has. Ultimately, the criminals are captured and James is proved innocent.

== Cast ==
- Donald Gray as James Martin
- Ann Wemyss as Joan Bauer
- Mary Newcomb as Helen Rollins
- Ronald Ward as Michael Waring
- Henri De Vries as Professor Bauer
- Alastair Sim as 'Pop' Lawler
- James Carew as Doctor Rollins
- Henry Caine as Sergeant Cox
- Eric Hales as Carter
- Joana Pereira as Miss Bauer
- Arnold Bell as Leech
- Lillian Talbot as Mrs Barker

== Reception ==
The Monthly Film Bulletin wrote: "The film is rather slow and the dialogue heavy. The acting generally is fairly good, but Alastair Sim is excellent. Donald Gray, as the hero, has little to do but wear an anxious look. He does that quite well."

The Daily Film Renter wrote: "The story, which gives the principals little acting opportunity – though Donald Gray and Helen Wemyss do their best as hero and heroine – allows for some clever sketches in the minor roles, Alastair Sim being particularly effective as a fussy and precise crook. Lilian Talbot and James Carew also score, but Mary Newcombe is wasted on an almost pointless part. ... The picture is not a particularly sophisticated production, but it avoids the more blatant faults of its class, such as crude dialogue and ultra-melodramatic characterisation. It makes good average entertainment."

Picturegoer wrote: "There are too many side issues to the plot and an overplus of dialogue which is apt to prove wearisome. Acting is fair but not remarkable."

Picture Show wrote: "It is rather long drawn out, competently acted and directed."
