= Tropic Madness =

1928 film

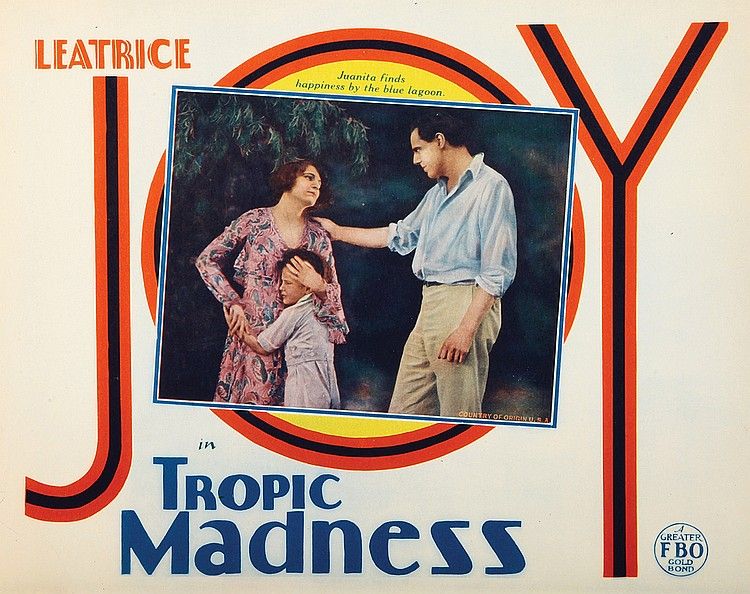
- Directed by: Robert G. Vignola
- Screenplay by: Randolph Bartlett; Wyndham Gittens
- Story by: Ramon Romero
- Starring: Leatrice Joy; Lena Malena; George Barraud; Henry Sedley; Albert Valentino; David Durand
- Cinematography: Nicholas Musuraca
- Edited by: Jack Kitchin
- Production company: Film Booking Offices of America
- Distributed by: Film Booking Offices of America
- Release date: December 19, 1928
- Running time: 65 minutes
- Country: United States
- Language: English

Tropic Madness is a 1928 American drama film directed by Robert G. Vignola, written by Randolph Bartlett and Wyndham Gittens, and starring Leatrice Joy, Lena Malena, George Barraud, Henry Sedley, Albert Valentino and David Durand. It was released on December 19, 1928, by Film Booking Offices of America.

== Cast ==
- Leatrice Joy as Juanita
- Lena Malena as Koki
- George Barraud as Henderson
- Henry Sedley as Johnson
- Albert Valentino as Lennox
- David Durand as Frankie
