= Ned McCobb's Daughter =

1928 American drama film

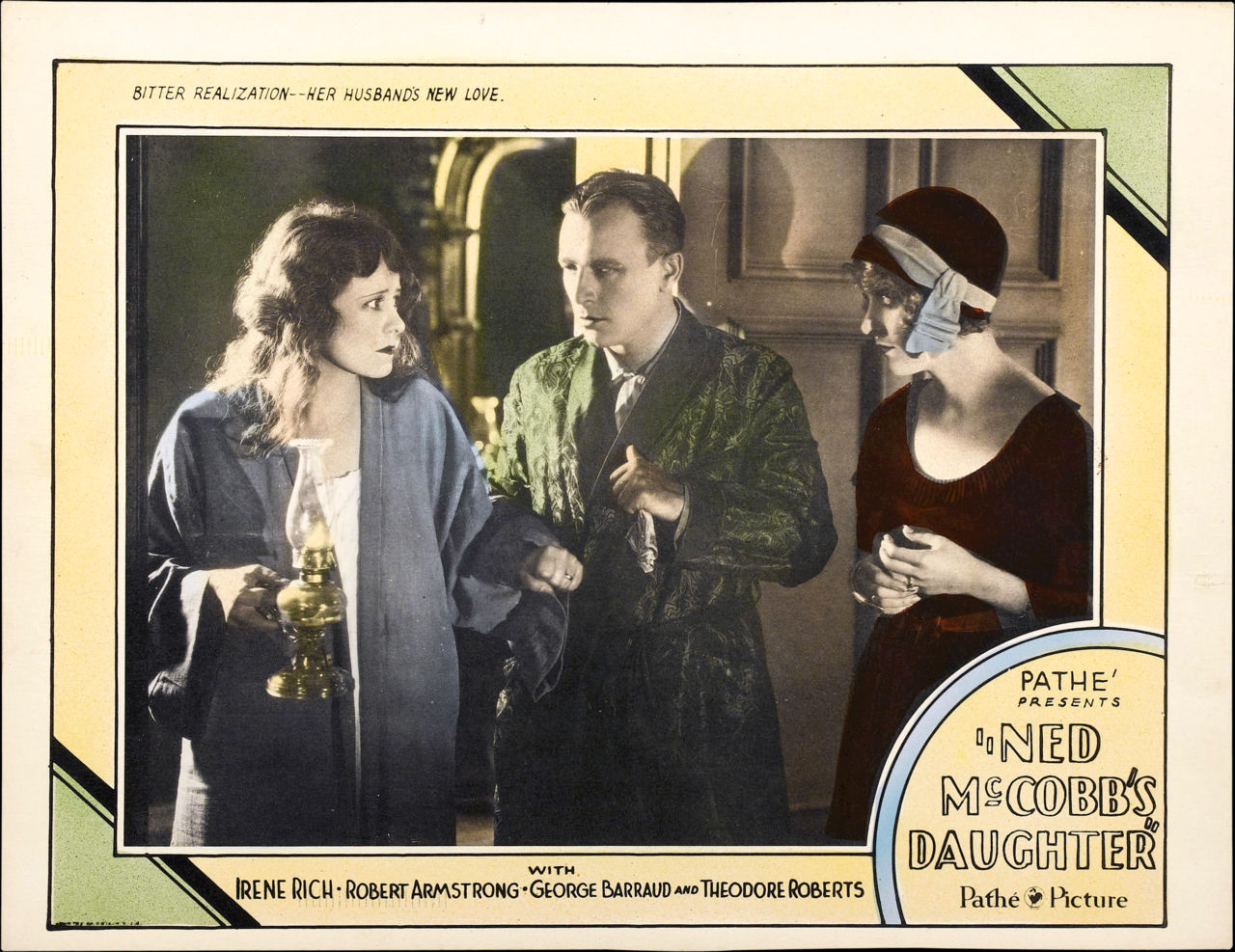
- Lobby card
- Directed by: William J. Cowen
- Written by: Lenore J. Coffee; Beulah Marie Dix; John W. Krafft (titles); Edwin Justus Mayer (titles)
- Based on: Ned McCobb's Daughter by Sidney Howard
- Starring: Irene Rich; Theodore Roberts; Robert Armstrong
- Cinematography: David Abel
- Edited by: Anne Bauchens
- Production company: Pathé Exchange
- Distributed by: Pathé Exchange
- Release date: December 2, 1928
- Running time: 71 minutes
- Country: United States
- Languages: English (Synchronized) (English intertitles)

Ned McCobb's Daughter is a 1928 American synchronized sound drama film directed by William J. Cowen and starring Irene Rich, Theodore Roberts, and Robert Armstrong. While the film has no audible dialog, it was released with a synchronized musical score with sound effects using the RCA Photophone sound-on-film process.

== Plot ==
Carrie Callahan runs a bustling restaurant serving "Carried Shore Dinners" in part of the large seaside home of her father, Ned McCobb, a retired sea captain who now pilots the local ferry. Her husband, George Callahan, works alongside them, collecting fares from ferry passengers.

George’s brother, Babe Callahan, a bootlegger posing as a building materials dealer, arrives with plans to use McCobb’s Ferry as a liquor distribution hub. Carrie, unaware of Babe’s true occupation, welcomes him with open-hearted New England hospitality. But Butterworth and Kelly, two suspicious prohibition agents who frequent Carrie’s restaurant, quickly grow wary of the new guest.

Carrie knows George once served time in prison, a secret she has kept from her father, but believes him to be reformed. In truth, George has been embezzling fare money to buy gifts for Jennie, a waitress in the restaurant with whom he is having an affair. When the transportation company uncovers the theft, the evidence emerges shortly after Babe’s arrival. The shock causes Ned McCobb to suffer a fatal stroke.

The company demands George repay $2,000 immediately to avoid prosecution. Carrie learns that George already persuaded her father to mortgage the McCobb house for a loan. Desperate and without options, she accepts Babe’s offer to cover the debt—on the condition that she allow him to base his bootlegging operation at the house. Reluctantly, she agrees, though the choice torments her conscience.

Jennie initially agrees to run off with George, but changes her mind upon discovering he intends to steal the money Carrie borrowed from Babe. Outraged, Carrie throws them out, but Babe insists they stay to preserve appearances critical to the success of his smuggling scheme.

Babe sets up headquarters in the basement, hiding liquor in a secret cache. Trucks with false bottoms carry the contraband, disguised under loads of sand meant for his phony building enterprise. His gang of rough bootleggers begins to overrun the restaurant, replacing its once-respectable patrons. Despite the grim transformation, Babe comes to admire Carrie’s strength and integrity, warning his men to treat her with respect. Carrie, in turn, sees in Babe a courageous if rough-edged man—so unlike her weak, dishonest husband. She tells him, “You’re a man, like Pa.”

Meanwhile, the prohibition officers plan a raid. Kelly begins snooping, and George, hoping to save himself, betrays Babe’s operation. But Kelly pulls out a pair of handcuffs, revealing George’s reward is arrest. In a panic, George kills him. Babe arrives, and though tempted to flee, chooses to stay and help Carrie and her children. He and George hide the body, narrowly evading a police raid.

Though nothing is found in the house, the officers discover the hidden compartments in the trucks and plan an ambush at a nearby bridge. Babe forces George to place Kelly’s body in one of the trucks and drive it—accompanied by his own children, whom George brings along to avoid suspicion. Carrie, horrified, turns to Babe for help.

A wild pursuit ensues. George speeds down a steep grade, but his truck’s brake rod snaps. Babe races alongside in another truck, risking his life to rescue the children, a little girl and a little boy, pulling them to safety moments before George's truck plunges off the bridge. George, too frightened to jump, perishes in the crash.

The authorities arrest Babe, but spare Carrie, recognizing her suffering. Before being taken away, Babe grasps her hand. "The Callahans have given you a raw deal," he says. "Will you let me try to make it up when I get out?" Carrie’s tearful eyes and swift kiss are her answer.

== Cast ==
- Irene Rich as Carol
- Theodore Roberts as Ned McCobb
- Robert Armstrong as Babe Callahan
- George Barraud as George Callahan
- Edward Hearn as Butterworth
- Carole Lombard as Jennie
- Louis Natheaux as Kelly
- Carmencita Johnson as Little Girl
- Billy Naylor as Little Boy

== Music ==
The song "High Up On A Hill Top" by Ian Campbell, Abel Baer, and George Whiting is featured on the soundtrack as the theme song.

== Preservation ==
This film is now lost.

== See also ==
- List of early sound feature films (1926–1929)

== Bibliography ==
- Wes D. Gehring. Carole Lombard, the Hoosier Tornado. Indiana Historical Society Press, 2003.
