= Marguerita Padula =

American actress and performer

Marguerita Anna Padula
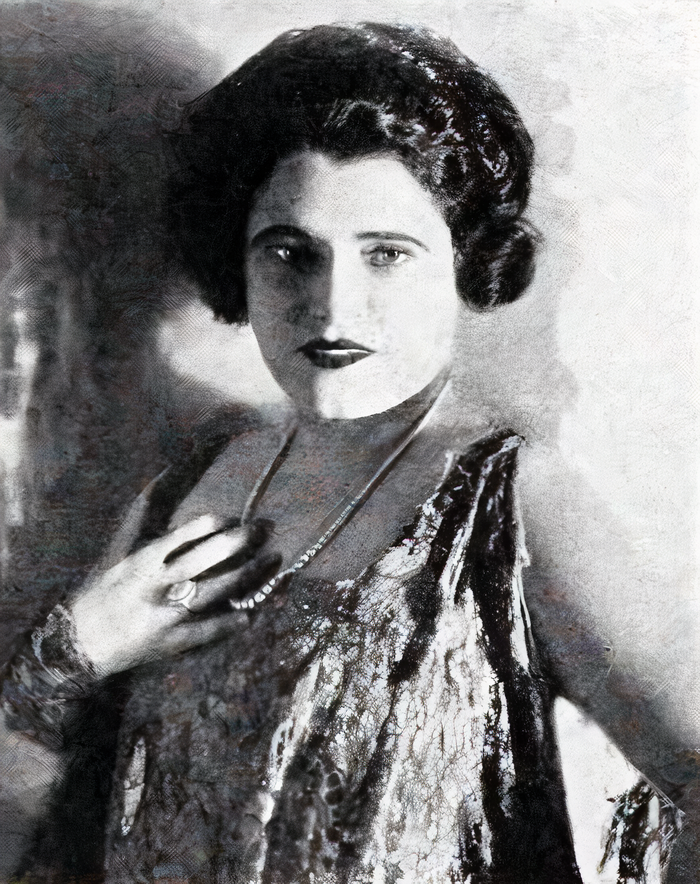
- Marguerita Padula in 1926
- Born: December 20, 1890; Worcester, Massachusetts, U.S.
- Died: February 22, 1957 (aged 66); West Hollywood, California, U.S.
- Resting place: Holy Cross Cemetery, Culver City, U.S.
- Other names: Margaret Padula; Margarita Padula
- Occupations: Actress, singer
- Spouse: Francis Joseph Coffey (m. 1910; died 1920)

Marguerita Anna Padula (December 20, 1890 – February 22, 1957) was an American actress and performer, active in film, vaudeville and radio. She was often typified as a character actress, with her film credits including Hit the Deck, The Cuckoos and Kid Dynamite.

== Early life ==
Padula was born in Worcester, Massachusetts, to an Italian father and Irish-American mother. Her early music experience as an organist for the choir at her local church. Padula studied at the New England Conservatory of Music and was acclaimed as one of the best young pianists in Worcester, often playing the accompanying music for amateur shows in the area.

She married Francis Coffey in 1910.

== Career ==
By 1914, Padula entered the vaudeville circuit as one half of a comedic duo called “Hendricks & Padula”. During the 1920s she would play at various theaters around the country, receiving positive reviews for her piano playing, whistling and voice – said to have a range of four octaves. Her transition into the movie industry began with the role of Lavinia in the 1930 movie Hit the Deck. She was offered the role by an RKO executive after he heard her sing a rendition of the song ‘Hallelujah’ at a home gathering. For the next decade, Padula divided her time between film, radio and theater before taking a residency at a supper club run by Charley Foy in the San Fernando Valley.

== Later years & death ==
Towards the end of the 1940s, Padula’s health began to deteriorate to the point where she had to walk with the assistance of a cane. In September 1956, she was admitted to Mount Sinai Hospital (now Cedars-Sinai Medical Center) in Los Angeles suffering from pneumonia and ultimately had her leg amputated. She would later die at her home in West Hollywood on February 22, 1957, aged 66. She is buried at the Holy Cross Cemetery in Culver City.

== Filmography ==
Year	Title	Role	Notes
1930	Hit the Deck	Lavinia	
1930	The Cuckoos	Gypsy Queen	
1930	Billy the Kid	Nicky Whoosiz	
1930	The Happy Hottentots	Woman	Short film, uncredited
1933	Take a Chance	Dancehall Girl - Solo Singer	Uncredited
1933	The Big Casino	Self - Singer	Short film
1939	They All Come Out	Anna	Uncredited
1939	Lady of the Tropics	Madame Kya	Credited as Margaret Padula
1940	Road to Singapore	Properietress	Credited as Margarita Padula
1943	Kid Dynamite	Mrs. Lyons	Credited as Margaret Padula
1944	Wilson	Singer	Uncredited
1944	Bowery to Broadway	Singer	Uncredited
1947	The Gangster	Minor role	Uncredited
