= Don't Call It Love (film) =

1923 film by William C. deMille

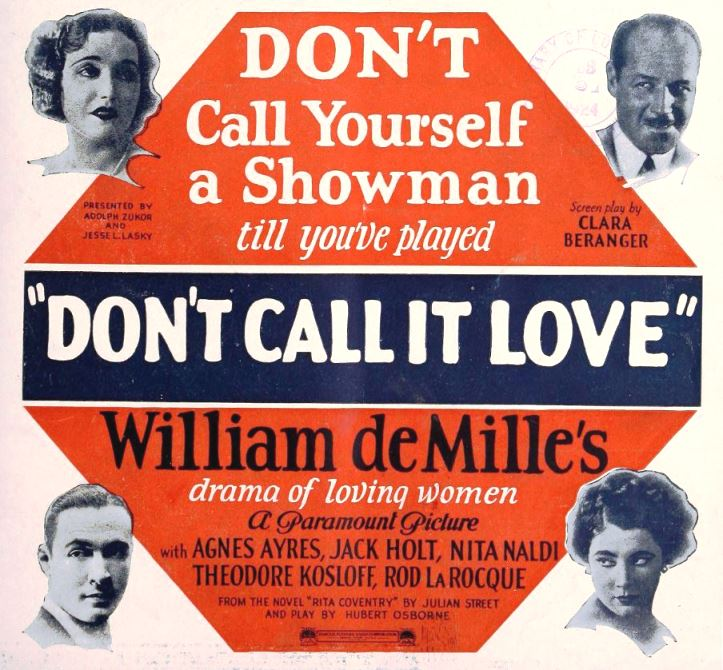
- Advertisement
- Directed by: William C. deMille
- Screenplay by: Clara Beranger; Julian Street
- Based on: Rita Coventry by Hubert Osborne
- Produced by: Adolph Zukor
- Starring: Agnes Ayres; Jack Holt; Nita Naldi; Theodore Kosloff; Rod La Rocque; Robert Edeson
- Cinematography: L. Guy Wilky
- Production company: Famous Players–Lasky Corporation
- Distributed by: Paramount Pictures
- Release date: December 24, 1923
- Running time: 70 minutes
- Country: United States
- Language: Silent (English intertitles)

Don't Call It Love is a 1923 American silent romantic comedy film directed by William C. deMille and written by Clara Beranger and Julian Street based upon the play Rita Coventry by Hubert Osborne. The film stars Agnes Ayres, Jack Holt, Nita Naldi, Theodore Kosloff, Rod La Rocque, and Robert Edeson. The film was released on December 24, 1923, by Paramount Pictures.

== Plot ==
As described in a film magazine review, vampish opera diva Rita Coventry is attracted to wealthy New Yorker Richard Parrish and determines to add him to her long list of admirers, much to the annoyance of her conductor Luigi Busini, who is jealous of the many loves of his star. Richard is easily led on, too easily, in fact. While the two are at Atlantic City, Rita promptly forgets his presence when Patrick Delaney, a young piano tuner, plays one of his compositions to her. She rushes back to New York City to arrange a hearing for him. Meanwhile, Alice Meldrum, an unassuming young woman who really loves Richard, hears of his infatuation. Her friend Clara Proctor advises her to play Richard instead of allowing him to take her as a matter of course. However, when Richard returns, Alice cannot deny him her love.

== Cast ==
- Agnes Ayres as Alice Meldrum
- Jack Holt as Richard Parrish
- Nita Naldi as Rita Coventry
- Theodore Kosloff as Luigi Busini
- Rod La Rocque as Patrick Delaney
- Robert Edeson as Henry Van Courtlandt
- Julia Faye as Clara Proctor

== Preservation ==
With no prints of Don't Call It Love located in any film archives, it is considered a lost film.
