= Lady of the Tropics =

1939 film by Jack Conway

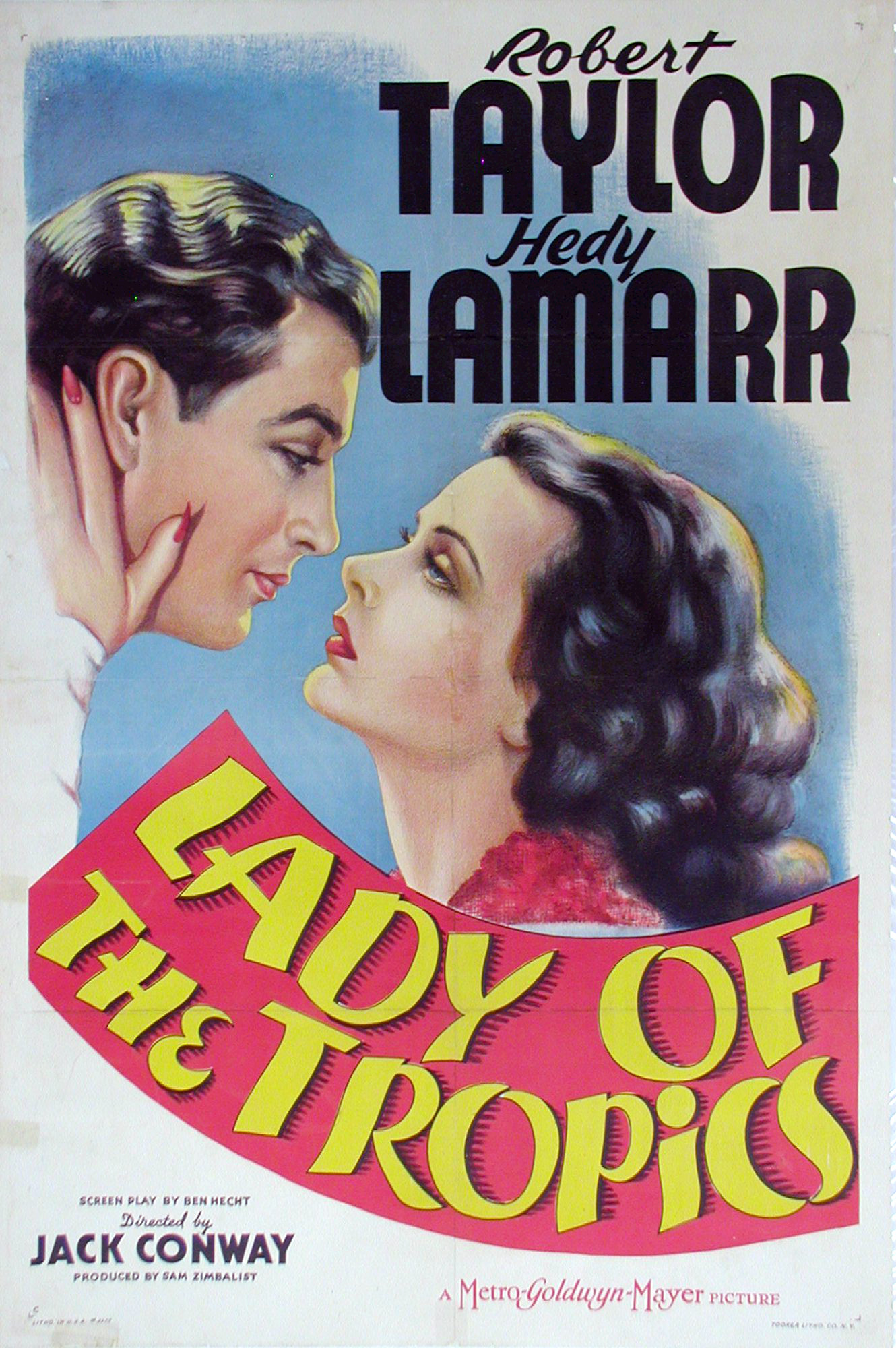
- Theatrical Film Poster
- Directed by: Jack Conway
- Screenplay by: Ben Hecht
- Produced by: Sam Zimbalist
- Starring: Robert Taylor; Hedy Lamarr
- Cinematography: George Folsey, A.S.C. Norbert Brodine (uncredited)
- Edited by: Elmo Veron
- Music by: Franz Waxman
- Production company: Metro-Goldwyn-Mayer
- Distributed by: Loew's Incorporated
- Release date: August 11, 1939
- Running time: 92 minutes
- Country: United States
- Language: English
- Budget: $913,000
- Box office: $1,533,000

Lady of the Tropics is a 1939 American drama film directed by Jack Conway, starring Robert Taylor and Hedy Lamarr, and featuring Joseph Schildkraut.

== Plot ==
While visiting French Indochina with his girlfriend Dolly Harrison and her family on her father's yacht, freeloading American playboy Bill Carey falls in love with Manon DeVargnes, a beautiful, local woman of mixed race background he meets in Saigon. Manon is also being romantically pursued by powerful local businessman Pierre Delaroch, also of biracial background, and is also supposed to marry a local king. However, Manon, who does not love either man, desires a passport so that she may go to Paris, to be free and have equal rights with white French citizens, which she lacks in Saigon.

Despite the two other men pursuing her, Manon prefers Bill, whom she meets at a local shop and helps to buy a hat that Dolly had wanted. Manon and Bill spend more time together that day, kiss, and fall in love. Bill, after leaving for Dolly the hat and a good-bye note, marries Manon, despite local priest Father Antoine, a friend of the Harrison family, warning that the marriage may be difficult, given Manon's part-Asian background.

When Bill is unable to find employment in Saigon, Manon secretly arranges to have Bill employed by Delaroch's company. Delaroch sends Bill off on a mission, and Manon spends time with Delaroch, including at the opera Manon Lescaut, which shares plot details with the film, including a beautiful woman who spends time with a wealthy man she does not love. Delaroch obtains Manon a passport, which she will use to go to America with Bill.

However, when Bill comes back, he discovers Delaroch's cigarette case at Manon's apartment, and a news clipping about Manon being seen at the opera with Delaroch; Bill angrily goes off to shoot Delaroch. The horrified Manon rushes off and meets Delaroch before Bill gets there; she accuses him of never having wanted her to use the passport, and leaving the cigarette case and news clipping in her apartment to manipulate Bill into leaving her. She also tells Delaroch Bill is coming to kill him. Delaroch laughs and says he will prevent that.

As he walks away, he turns around when Manon says she will protect Bill from being sent to prison; she has a gun. Despite his protests that he loves her, she shoots him dead. Bill arrives, then flees himself as he hears of the shooting.

At her room above her friend Nina's nightclub, Manon, looking at the boat that would have taken her away, shoots herself. Nina, in the middle of singing a song to an audience, hears the gunshot and finds Manon dying; Manon asks her to get Father Antoine. Bill arrives and tries to take her for medical help, but it is evident it will be futile; he puts her down on a bed, and she dies confessing her love for him. Father Antoine arrives and absolves the dead Manon of her sins, saying that where she is going there is no East or West, and that God will judge her heart; Manon's passport is seen in the background.

== Cast ==
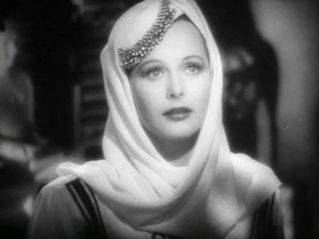
Cropped still of Hedy Lamarr from the trailer for the film.

- Robert Taylor as Bill Carey
- Hedy Lamarr as Manon DeVargnes
- Joseph Schildkraut as Pierre Delaroch
- Gloria Franklin as Nina
- Ernest Cossart as Father Antoine
- Mary Taylor as Dolly Harrison
- Charles Trowbridge as Alfred Z. Harrison
- Frederick Worlock as Colonel Demassey
- Paul Porcasi as Lamartine
- Margaret Padula as Madame Kya
- Cecil Cunningham as Countess Berichi
- Natalie Moorhead as Mrs. Hazlitt

== Song ==
"Each Time You Say Goodbye [I Die a Little]"

- Music by Phil Ohman
- Lyrics by Foster Carling

Opera sequence staged by William von Wymetal

== Reception ==
According to MGM records, the film made $1,042,000 in the US and Canada and $491,000 elsewhere, resulting in a profit of $99,000.

It was on a preliminary list of submissions from the studios for an Academy Award for Best Black-and-White Cinematography, but was not nominated.
