= Margaret Vines =

British actress (1907–1997)

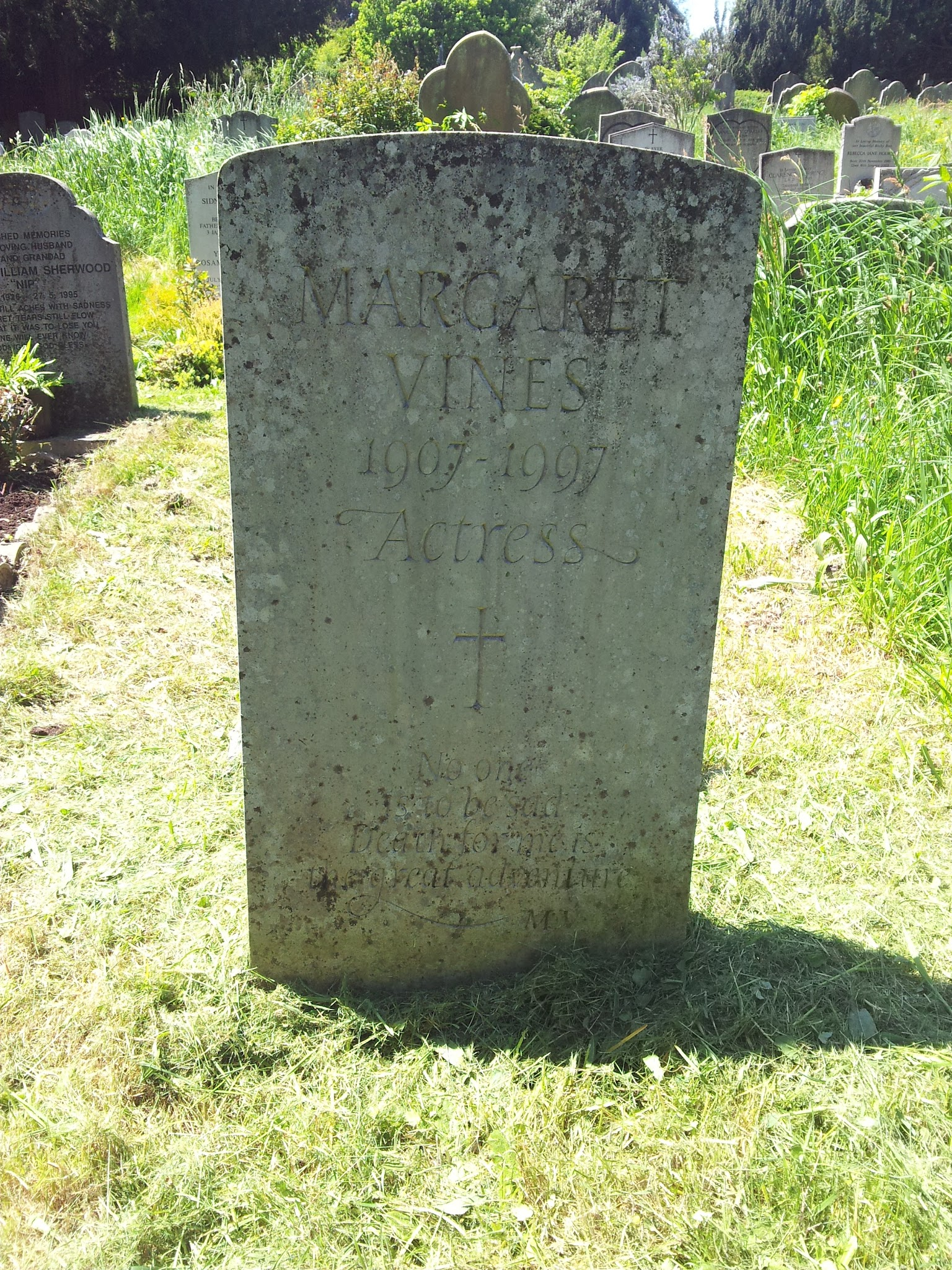
Gravestone of Margaret Vines

Margaret Vines (16 January 1907 – 1 March 1997) was a British actress. She performed initially on stage, in the London West End, in the 1920s and 1930s. She then progressed into a career on screen, appearing in several films as well as TV productions.

Vines was born on 16 January 1907 in Lourenco Marques, Portuguese East Africa. She studied at St. Andrew's School in Johannesburg. After moving to London to study at the Royal Academy of Dramatic Art, she made her professional acting debut in 1926 at the Brixton Theatre. She also made her Broadway debut as Anne of Bohemia in Richard of Bordeaux (1934).

Vines received a Clarence Derwent Award in 1955 for Best West End Supporting Actress for her work in Morning's at Seven.

Vines was married to Edmund Loftus-Tottenham. Following the end of that marriage, she married Denis Gordon in 1947.

== Filmography ==
Her films as an actress included:

- Frail Women (1932)
- Open All Night (1934)
- The Vicar of Bray (1937)
