= Hit the Deck (1930 film) =

1930 film by Luther Reed

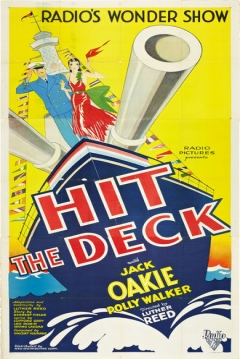
- Theatrical release poster
- Directed by: Luther Reed
- Written by: Hubert Osborne; Herbert Fields; Luther Reed
- Based on: Hit the Deck; 1927 musical by book by Herbert Fields lyrics by Leo Robin and Clifford Grey music by Vincent Youmans
- Produced by: William LeBaron
- Starring: Jack Oakie; Pollie Walker
- Cinematography: Robert Kurrle
- Edited by: William Hamilton
- Music by: Vincent Youmans
- Distributed by: RKO Radio Pictures
- Release dates: January 14, 1930 (New York City); February 23, 1930 (United States)
- Running time: 93 minutes
- Country: United States
- Language: English
- Budget: $542,000
- Box office: $1.1 million

Hit the Deck is a 1930 American pre-Code musical film directed by Luther Reed and starring Jack Oakie and 1923 Miss America runner-up Heather Eulalie "Polly" Walker, with Technicolor sequences. It was based on the 1927 musical Hit the Deck, which was itself based on the 1922 play Shore Leave by Hubert Osborne. It was one of the most expensive productions of RKO Radio Pictures up to that time, and one of the most expensive productions of 1930. This version faithfully reproduced the stage version of the musical.

== Plot ==
Looloo runs a diner which is frequented with U.S. Navy sailors on shore leave, including officers. Two officers, Admiral Smith and Lieutenant Allen, accompany wealthy socialite Mrs. Payne to the establishment.

Mrs. Payne is an heiress, and when she engages in conversation with Looloo, she expresses admiration for the necklace Looloo is wearing. She offers to purchase it for a substantial sum, but it is a family heirloom and Looloo refuses. Later, two sailors arrive at the diner, Bilge and Clarence, looking for Lavinia, Clarence's sweetheart who has run away. Bilge, is smitten with Looloo, and begins to romance her. Opening up to her, he reveals his desire to become the captain of his own ship after he leaves the Navy. Before things go too far, Bilge's shipmates drag him back to his ship, which is scheduled to set sail.

Based on her conversation with Bilge, Looloo decides to sell her necklace to Mrs. Payne in order to get the funds necessary to buy a ship for Bilge. When Bilge's ship docks once again, the two lovers are re-united, and Bilge proposes to Looloo, who happily accepts. However, when she tells him about the money, and the plans she has made to help him buy his own ship, his pride makes him indignant and he storms off. However, he later returns and the two agree to marry.

== Cast ==
- Jack Oakie as Bilge
- Polly Walker as Looloo
- Roger Gray as Mat
- Franker Wood as Bat
- Harry Sweet as Bunny
- Marguerita Padula as Lavinia
- June Clyde as Toddy
- Wallace MacDonald as Lieutenant Allen
- George Ovey as Clarence
- Ethel Clayton as Mrs. Payne
- Nate D. Slott as Dan (credited as Nate Slott)
- Andy Clark as Dinty
- Dell Henderson as Admiral Smith
- Charles Sullivan as Lieutenant Jim Smith
- Grady Sutton as sailor (uncredited)

== Songs ==
- "Sometimes I'm Happy" – words by Irving Caesar, music by Vincent Youmans; performed by Jack Oakie and Polly Walker
- "Keepin' Myself for You" – words by Sidney Clare, music by Vincent Youmans; performed by Jack Oakie and Polly Walker
- "An Armful of You" – words by Leo Robin and Clifford Grey, music by Vincent Youmans; performed by Marguerita Padula and chorus
- "Hallelujah" – words by Leo Robin and Clifford Grey, music by Vincent Youmans; performed by Marguerita Padula and chorus
- "Harbor of My Heart" – words by Leo Robin and Clifford Grey, music by Vincent Youmans; performed by Jack Oakie and chorus
- "Join the Navy" – words by Leo Robin and Clifford Grey, music by Vincent Youmans; performed by Jack Oakie and chorus
- "Nothing Could Be Sweeter" – words by Leo Robin and Clifford Grey, music by Vincent Youmans; performed by Jack Oakie and Polly Walker

== Reception ==
The film made a profit of $145,000. Mordaunt Hall, The New York Times critic, gave the film a lackluster review, writing that it "is anything but an inspired entertainment. Except for one or two sequences, the mixing of the story and spectacle doesn't jell. The fun is labored and the romance is more painful than sympathetic."

Before the Hit the Deck could be exhibited in Kansas, the Kansas Board of Review required the elimination of a "wiggle dance" due to "excessive wiggling" by the lead chorus girl.

== Other adaptations ==
The Broadway musical, Hit the Deck, on which this film is based was written by Herbert Fields, with music by Vincent Youmans, and lyrics by Leo Robin and Clifford Grey; it premiered in New York City on April 25, 1927. That musical was based on an earlier play, Shore Leave, written by Hubert Osborne, which premiered in New York City on August 8, 1922. The play had been made into a silent film, also entitled Shore Leave, starring Richard Barthelmess and Dorothy Mackaill. Osborne's play would also be remade into another musical version, Follow the Fleet, in 1936, starring Fred Astaire and Ginger Rogers.

== Preservation status ==
One reel of the film survives at the Eye Filmmuseum archive with an estimated running time of six minutes and thirty four seconds. In the surviving portion Jack Oakie (as Bilge) and Polly Walker (as Looloo) sing "The Harbor Of My Heart" in Looloo's coffee shop shortly after the shop closes and they are left alone. Looloo then proceeds to go into the kitchen to make some food for Bilge while he washes up. While the food is cooking, we see Looloo calling Mrs. Payne (Ethel Clayton) in order to sell her necklace. Meanwhile, Bilge's friends come by and he goes with them. Before leaving Bilge promises Lavinia who works at Looloo's coffee shop (played by Marguerita Padula) that he will be back in half an hour. The surviving reel ends with Looloo waiting for Bilge to come back. The last known complete copy of the film was destroyed in an RKO fire in the 1950s.

== See also ==
- List of lost films
- List of incomplete or partially lost films
- List of early color feature films
- List of early sound feature films (1926–1929)
