= Hit the Deck (musical) =

Musical

Hit the Deck is a musical with music by Vincent Youmans, lyrics by Clifford Grey and Leo Robin and book by Herbert Fields. It was based on the 1922 play Shore Leave by Hubert Osborne. The title refers to a nautical slang term that means to prepare for action (general) or to drop to a prone position on the ground (as a defensive response to hostile fire). The musical is set in China and Newport, Rhode Island, and on a ship traveling between the two locations.

The original production was staged at the Belasco Theatre on Broadway, opening on April 25, 1927, and running for 352 performances. Charles King played Bilge and Louise Groody played Loulou. The show's co-producers were Youmans and Lew Fields, and Lew Fields co-directed with Alexander Leftwich. The production ran for 352 performances.

The first London production opened at the Hippodrome on July 3, 1927 and ran for 277 performances. It starred Stanley Holloway. In The Manchester Guardian, Ivor Brown praised Holloway for a singing style "which coaxes the ear rather than clubbing the head."

== Songs ==
Act I

- Join the Navy – Loulou, Gobs and Girls
- What's a Kiss Among Friends? – Toddy, Charlotte, Alan and Girls
- Harbor of My Heart – Loulou and Bilge
- Shore Leave – Chorus
- Lucky Bird – Lavinia
- Looloo – Loulou and Boys
- Why, Oh Why? – Charlotte and Chorus
- Sometimes I'm Happy (Sometimes I'm Blue) – Loulou and Bilge

Act II

- Hallelujah! – Lavinia and Chorus
- Hallelujah! (reprise) – Lavinia
- Looloo (reprise) – Loulou and Boys
- Utopia – Loulou and Bunny

== Film adaptations ==
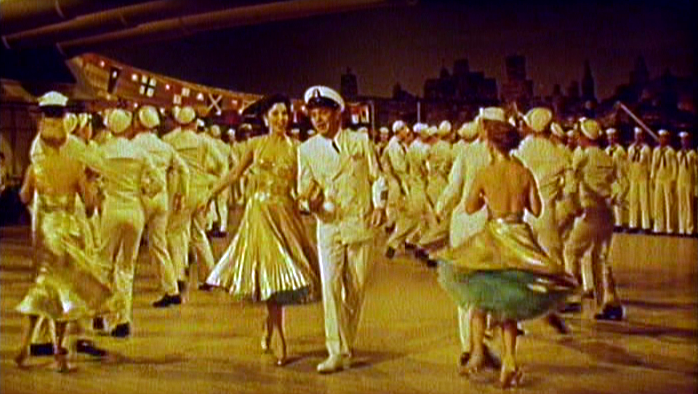
Hit the Deck (1955) with Ann Miller and Tony Martin

Two films based on the musical were made. The first was in 1930 and stars Jack Oakie. It was remade in 1955 with a slightly different screenplay and differently named characters. It stars Jane Powell and Tony Martin.
