= Mary Newcomb =

American actress (1893–1966)

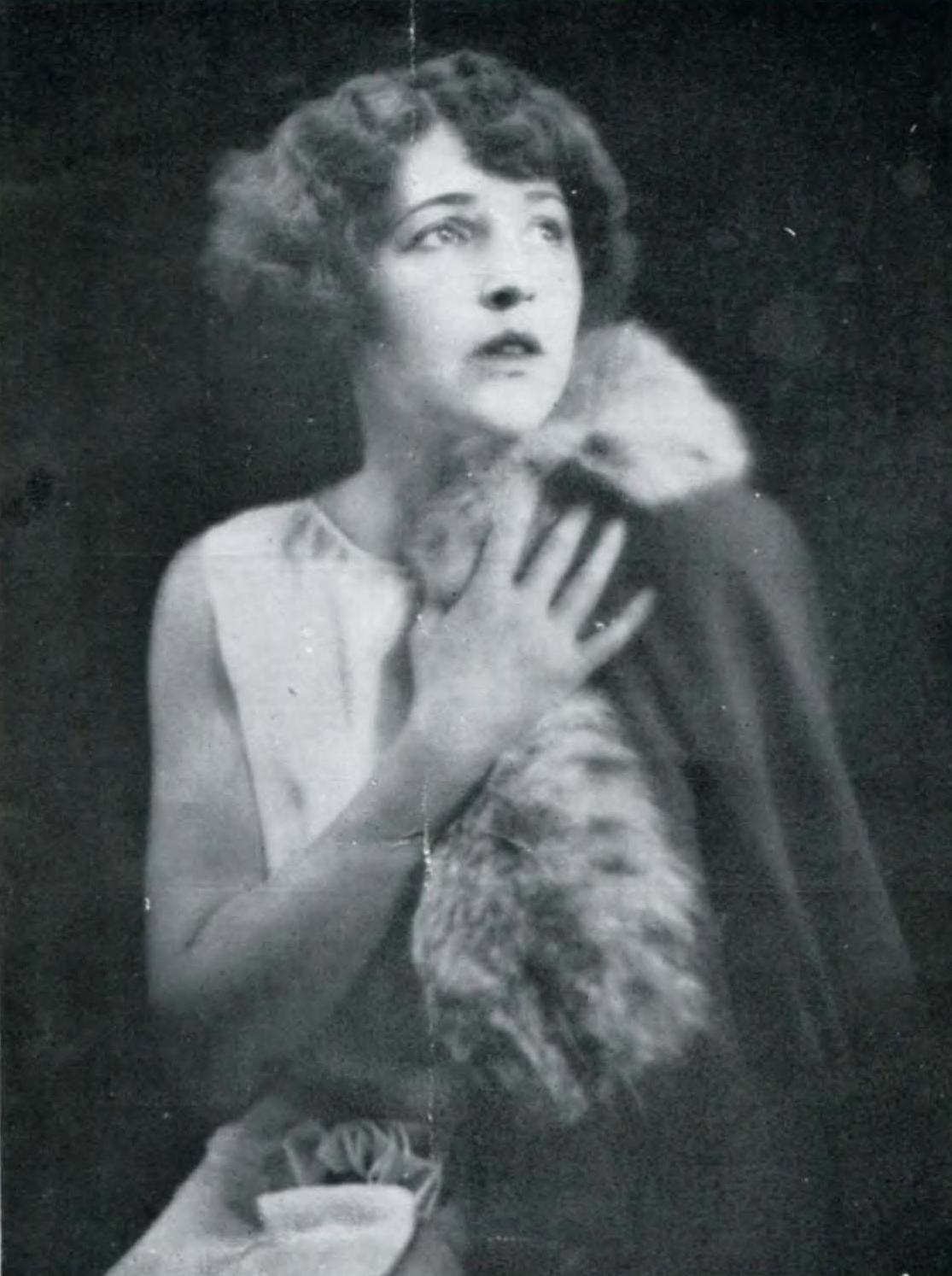
Mary Newcomb, 1923

Mary Newcomb (1893–1966) was an American actress who appeared on the American and British stage and in films.

== Early life ==
Mary Newcomb was born on August 21, 1893, in North Adams, Massachusetts, the daughter of Josiah Turner Newcomb, and Sophie De Wolfe Newcomb. She grew up in New York City and La Grangeville in Dutchess County, New York. She attended Lauralton Hall Academy, a convent school for girls in Milford, Connecticut.

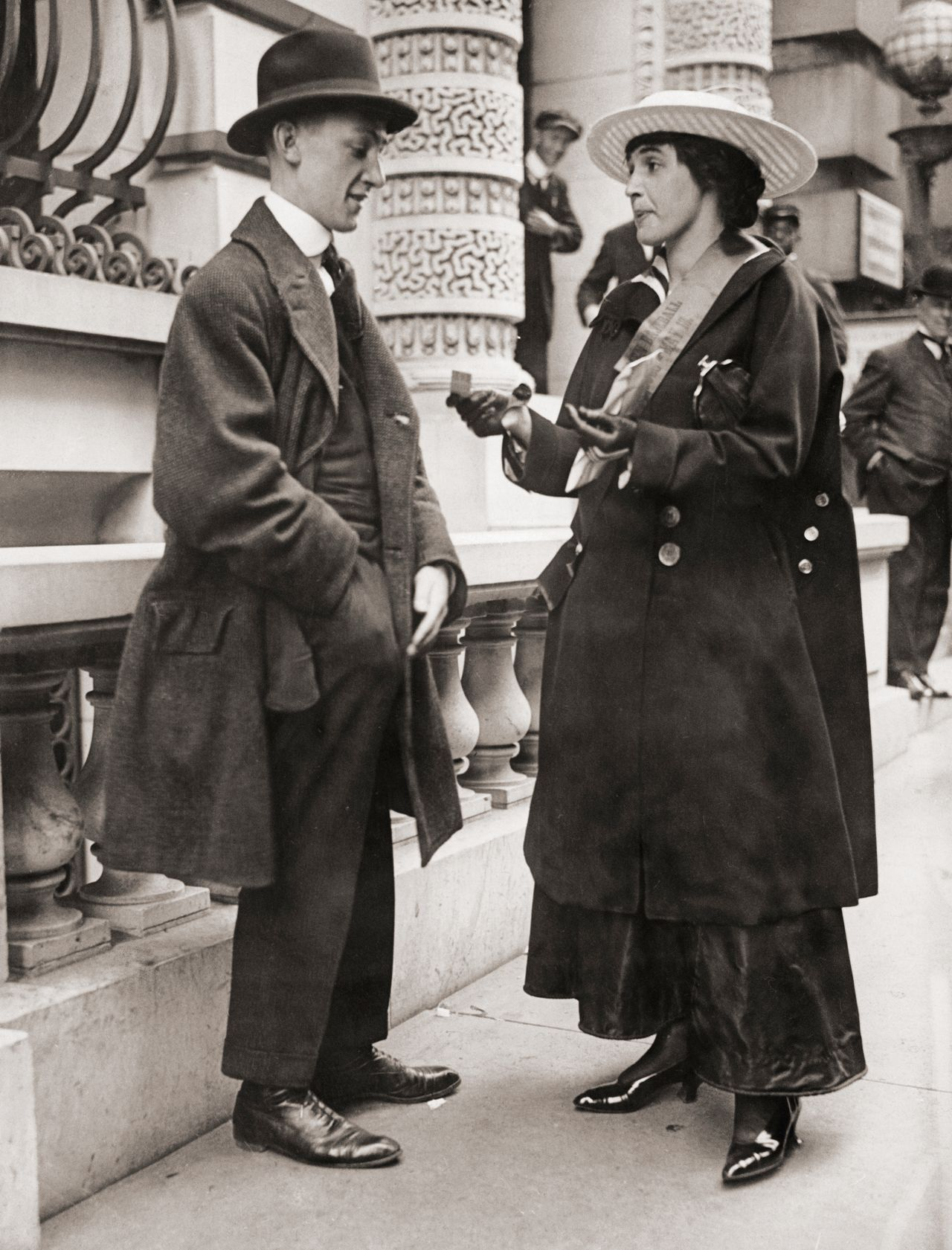
Mary Newcomb sells tickets to the "Suffrage Baseball Day" in 1915

Newcomb was an advocate for allowing women to vote, giving speeches with Carrie Chapman Catt and Elsie Lincoln Benedict. She began lecturing on a suffrage tour when she was 17, addressing New York crowds from Albany to Battery Park.

== Acting career ==
Newcomb's "first actual role" was in His Brother's Keeper, a production of Edeson's company.

Newcomb and Edeson were divorced in 1924.

Newcomb married banker Alexander Henry Higginson on June 28, 1925. Alex was from Boston, the son of Henry Lee Higginson, a financier, and Ida Agassiz, the daughter of Louis Agassiz, a noted Harvard professor. Alex was known as an accomplished yachtsman, steeplechaser, and fox hunter. After her marriage Mary retired from the stage briefly and lived with Alex in South Lincoln, Mass. and the Back Bay of Boston. With encouragement from Alex, Mary resumed her acting career in New York in 1927. Together Alex and Mary rented an apartment at 135 East 56th St. She appeared in “A Woman Disputed” and then again in “The Distant Drum” by Vincent Lawrence at the Hudson Theatre. At that time J. Brooks Atkinson of The New York Times wrote of her, “Mary Newcomb returning from what seems to have been a retirement of some minor sort makes an unusually sympathetic and appealing character of the wife, a part which is with truth from beginning to end.” She also appeared in “Sign on the Door in by Robert R. Mill in March of 1928. In May of 1928 the Higginson’s apartment was robbed. Thieves got away with jewelry, clothes, and furs.

In December of 1928 Mary and Alex went to London where Mary appeared at the Fortune Theater opposite Crane Wilber in “Jealousy”, a two character play adapted by Eugene Walter from a French play by Louis Verneuil. It was a great success and Mary was acclaimed by the critics. In April 1929 she appeared opposite Leslie Banks in “The Infinite Shoeblack” by Norman McGowan at the Arts Theatre Club, and in September she appeared as Lady Hamilton in ”Emma Hamilton”, a play by

E. Temple Thurston at the New Theatre. The critics were less approving of her next play “Healthy, Wealthy, and Wise”, a comedy by Eleanor Chilton and Herbert Agar, at the New Theatre about spoiled wealthy New York socialites.

Around that time Alex and Mary decided to stay in England permanently. They signed a 40-year lease on Stinsford House (the Dower House of the Duchess of Ilford) in Stinsford near Dorchester, Dorset. There Alex became heavily involved in Fox Hunting and served for many years as Master of the Cattistock Hunt. Eventually he also became Master of the South Dorset Hunt. They kept a flat in Mayfair in London so that Mary could continue her career on the London Stage.

Among Mary and Alex's good friends and riding partners were Lord and Lady Digby who lived at nearby Minton Magna. Their daughter Pamela, who was then a teenager, later married Winston Churchill's son Randolph. She eventually went on to marry the American producer, Leland Hayward, and finally, Averell Harriman. In his biography of Pamela, Christopher Ogden said that Pamela's favorite visitors were Alex and Mary Higginson, who were the first Americans she ever met. He wrote that Mary was the most glamorous and fashionable woman Pamela had ever encountered. “She could sit for hours, her mouth agape, listening to Mary’s stories and her devastating mimicry.”

In 1930 Mary appeared again in “Jealously” opposite the young actor John Wyse for five nights from June 25 to June 29 at the Arts Theatre Club on Newport Street to favorable reviews. The play then moved to the Little Theatre for several weeks. In August she appeared in “John O’ Dreams”, a comedy in three acts, opposite José G. Levy, again at the Little Theatre. Mary's next appearance came in December opposite Brian Aherne in “A Marriage Has Been Disarranged” at the Royalty Theatre.

In 1931 Mary starred in another comedy “Supply and Demand”, by Philip and Amiee Stuart at The Theatre Royal, Haymarket. The cast included Clive Morton, Nigel Bruce, and Marjorie Clark. Later that year Mary appeared in “Behold the Bridegroom” by George Kelly.

Mary then changed course. She starred in her first British film entitled “Frail Women” under Maurice Elvery's direction at Twickingham Studios. Upon viewing a day's filming Philip Slessor, Film Weekly's Studio Correspondent, described her as mature and dignified, a soigné and sophisticate, who could take a story of average intelligence and dramatic power and bring to bear upon it a consummate knowledge of stage craft. He said of her, “With a millionaire husband she has no need to act for a living; she acts because she must. Her personality, and the public, demand that she should.” After “Frail Women”, Julius Hagan signed Mary to a three-year film contract, saying “In my opinion, there is no one of her type to touch her in either England or Hollywood. She has either studied film technique or is a born screen actress.”

Mary went on to star opposite George Barrard in the film “Women Who Play” which was based on the successful stage production in of “Spring Cleaning”. That film was followed by “The Marriage Bond” which included Guy Newall. Many scenes from “The Marriage Bond” were filmed in and around Mary and Alex's home at Stinsford in Dorset.

In 1932 Mary's career took another important turn when she appeared in her first play by William Shakespeare. She played Portia in “The Merchant of Venice” at the St. James Theatre opposite Ernest Milton who played Shylock. Reviewers described their performances as a triumph.

In June 1933 Mary appeared in a new play “When Ladies Meet” by Rachel Carothers at the Lyric Theatre. The plot revolves around a love triangle, and the cast included Mary, Marie Tempest, Owen Nares, and Ann Todd. Later that year Mary did something very unusual. Because her entrance in “When Ladies Meet” did not come until the second act, she was able to take on a one act play at another theatre. “La Voix Humaine” by Jean Cocteau was a twenty five minute telephone monologue preceding another play at the Ambassadors Theatre. In it Mary presented an abandoned lover's anguish with great emotion. It was described by one reviewer as a tour de force. In December 1933 Mary opened as the lead in an adaptation by R.G. Trevelyan of “Angel”, a play written by the Hungarian dramatist Melchior Lengyel. In it she played a highly successful married woman who asserts her right to find romantic satisfaction outside her marriage, as many men do. In April 1934 Mary appeared in “There’s Always Tomorrow” a new play by Lionel Brown at the Shaftesbury Theatre.

In September of that year Mary began the first of five plays in the 1934-1935 Season at the Old Vic. On opening night she played Cleopatra in Shakespeare's “Antony and Cleopatra” while Wilfred Lawson played Antony. In his review W.A. Darlingtion wrote, “Her performance took her straight into the hearts of the “bardolaters” of Waterloo Road. She is now one of their idols forever.” Next in November Mary took the role of Beatrice in “Much Ado About Nothing” opposite Cecil Trouncer who played Leonato while Nancy Hornsby played Leonato's daughter Hero. In late November and into December Mary continued at the Old Vic in George Bernard Shaw's “St. Joan”. Mr. Shaw himself directed the production. And while previously Joan had been portrayed by others as resolute and severe, Shaw encouraged Mary to portray Joan as a sentimental, sweet young woman. This she did and was met with great approval by the audience. As one reviewer summed it up, “It was in that magnificent lonely speech in Rheims Cathedral that Miss Newcomb found her triumph, though in the Inquisition she lost nothing.” In January Mary played Emilia in Shakespeare's Othello and in February she was Phaedra in Hippolytus. In March she was Barbara in Bernard Shaw's “Major Barbara” opposite Maurice Evans as Adolphus Cusins while Cecil Trouncer played Andrew Undershaft.

1936 began with Mary playing Judith Coventry in “The Prickly Pear” at the Q Theatre. In April Mary replaced Irene Brown as Stella Harringway in “Children to Bless You” at the Duke of York's Theatre with Marjorie Mars as Audrey. The critic Sydney Carroll extolled Mary's ability to take over the noted actress’ part. “It was no slavish imitation; a different woman came on the scene without in the slightest destroying the structure of the comedy or even affecting its texture, except, perhaps for the better.” In November she appeared in “Storm Over Europe” by Douglas Jerrold, a play about the restoration of a monarch in an unnamed European country. She played Princess Dolores opposite George Hayes who played President Ruysdael.

== Post-Theater Life ==
In 1937 Mary's focus shifted away from the theater so that she could devote time to her husband and her extended family. Her young niece, Mary Gilman, spent a year with Mary and Alex at Stinsford, returning home to America just before the outbreak of World War II.

In July 1939 Mary was the star attraction in a huge “Spirit of Dorset” women’s pageant that took place at Lulworth Castle. The production was sponsored by the Dorset Federation of Women's Institutes, and between 600 and 700 Institute members and their friends took part in it. Mary played the last Abbess of Shaftesbury, Elizabeth Zouche, marking that 1939 was the 400th anniversary of the surrender of the Abbey to the Crown in the Dissolution of the Monasteries. A review in the Western Gazette stated "Miss Newcomb gave a moving and dignified study of the Abbess and the scene when the crowd pressed around her, many weeping and kneeling to ask her blessing, was poignant.”

In September 1939 Mary launched The Mary Newcomb Players, a theater troop that traveled through the South of England and later in Europe to support the war effort by producing plays to entertain the troops. Her troupe included actors from London and other places, and whenever possible Mary recruited soldiers who were stationed at various bases to take parts in her productions. In her later years Mary described driving at night during the blackout without headlights down country roads in Southern England to put on performances at obscure bases. In an account of the Players’ first performance of “In the Zone” by Eugene O’Neill, featuring several young soldiers and presented before 500 of their fellow soldiers, Mary wrote, “In my Prompt Corner I trembled and paled and doubted that one line would ever be spoken, much less heard. But I was wrong. Utterly sincere and unselfconscious, the boys had their audience quiet and listening in two minutes, and held them so – with the help of Mr. O’Neill – for forty.” Among the Players’ other productions were “The Man With A Load Of Mischief”, “French Leave”, “Gas Light”, and “Jealousy”. In 1943 Mary took her Players to London to raise money to support the troupe's efforts by performing several benefit plays including “A Man With A Load Of Mischief” and Eugene O’Neill's “Days Without End.” After the D- Day landings in Normandy The Mary Newcomb Players traveled to France, Holland, and Belgium to continue their support for the war effort.

After World War II, Mary Newcomb's focus remained with her husband Alex in Dorset. She was active in local affairs and was a patron of the county's annual Music Series. Each year she hosted the Stinsford Church's annual FETE on the grounds of Stinsford House.

After the war Mary, who had been confirmed in the Church of England in 1937, joined the Roman Catholic Church. This decision was no doubt influenced by her secondary school education under the Sisters of Mercy at Lauralton Hall, and also by her portrayal of St. Joan. Her husband Alex died in 1957. Several years later Mary moved out of Stinsford House to a house in the nearby Village of Puddletown. She spent several months each winter in New York where her sister, brother, and extended family lived.

== Death ==
Newcomb died on December 26, 1966, at her home in England at age 73. She is buried with her husband Alex in the churchyard of St. Michael's Church adjacent to Stinsford House.

== Selected filmography ==
- The Passionate Pilgrim (1921)
- The Marriage Bond (1932)
- Frail Women (1932)
- Women Who Play (1932)
- Strange Experiment (1937)
