= Shore Leave (1925 film) =

1925 film

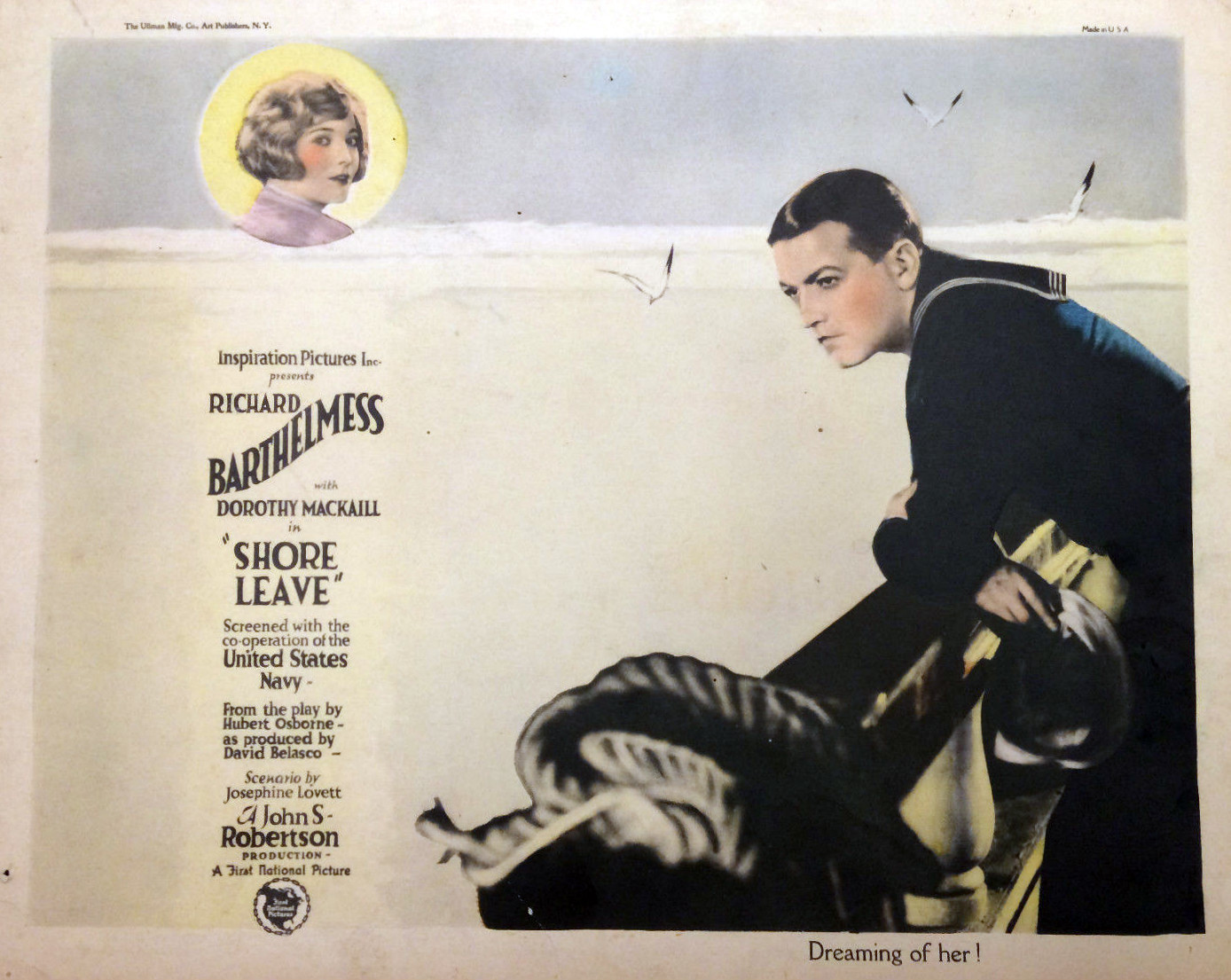
- Lobby card
- Directed by: John S. Robertson
- Written by: Josephine Lovett; Agnes Smith (titles)
- Based on: Shore Leave by Hubert Osborne
- Produced by: Richard Barthelmess
- Cinematography: Roy Overbaugh; Stewart Nelson
- Edited by: William Hamilton
- Production company: Inspiration Pictures
- Distributed by: First National Pictures
- Release date: September 6, 1925 (United States)
- Running time: 7 reels
- Country: United States
- Language: Silent (English intertitles)

Shore Leave is a 1925 American silent comedy film directed by John S. Robertson and starring Richard Barthelmess and Dorothy Mackaill. It was produced by Barthelmess's production company, Inspiration, and released by First National Pictures.

Shore Leave is based on the stage play of the same name written by Hubert Osborne. The play ran on Broadway at the Lyceum Theatre from August 8 to December 1922 for a total of 151 performances. The play starred James Rennie and Frances Starr as the leads played by Barthelmess and Mackaill in the film.

== Cast ==
- Richard Barthelmess as Bilge Smith
- Dorothy Mackaill as Connie Martin
- Ted McNamara as Bat Smith
- Nick Long as Captain Martin
- Marie Shotwell as Mrs. Schuyler-Payne
- Arthur Metcalfe as Mr. Schuyler-Payne
- Warren Cook as Admiral Smith
- Samuel E. Hines as Chief Petty officer

== Preservation ==
Shore Leave survives in the public domain and is available for download at archive.org. It is also available with musical accompaniment from online streaming services.

A print of Shore Leave is in a private collection.
