= George Barraud =

English actor (1889–1970)

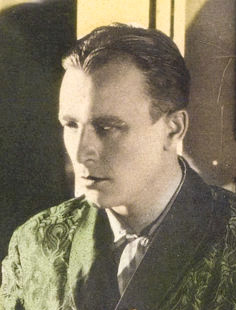
George Barraud in Ned McCobb's Daughter in 1928

George Barraud (17 December 1889, in Paddington, London, England – January 1970, in London, England) was a British film actor.

== Selected filmography ==
- Little Old New York (1923)
- Flaming Youth (1923)
- The Wolf Man (1924)
- Ned McCobb's Daughter (1928)
- Tropic Madness (1928) Movie thought lost except for one reel discovered 2022 - now on Youtube
- The Bellamy Trial (1929)
- The Last of Mrs. Cheyney (1929)
- Woman to Woman (1929)
- Peacock Alley (1930)
- Road to Paradise (1930)
- The Happy Ending (1931)
- The Return of Raffles (1932)
- Women Who Play (1932)
- After Dark (1932)
- Great Expectations (1934)
- Charlie Chan in London (1934)
- Mystery Woman (1935)
- Accused (1936)
- Two on a Doorstep (1936)
- Show Flat (1936)
- Talk of the Devil (1936)
- Stolen Life (1939)
